= 1797 in literature =

This article contains information about the literary events and publications of 1797.

== Events ==
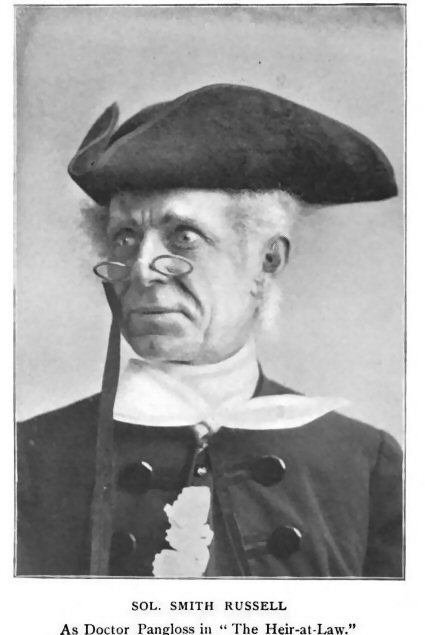
Sol Smith Russell, one of many well-known actors who have played Dr. Pangloss

- June 5 – Poet Samuel Taylor Coleridge, living at Nether Stowey in the Quantock Hills, Somerset, renews his friendship with William Wordsworth and Wordsworth's sister, Dorothy, who take a house nearby.
- July 15 – George Colman's comedy The Heir at Law opens at the Haymarket in London, with John Fawcett playing Dr. Pangloss. The play ran for 27 performances. The play is best known for creating the comic character of Dr. Peter Pangloss, a greedy and pompous teacher hired at a salary of 300 pounds a year to tutor the merchant Daniel Dowlas, who has been recently elevated to the title of Lord Duberly after the death of a distant cousin. Pangloss refers to himself as an "LL.D. and A.S.S.", and the character is fond of spouting off literary quotes, which he then attributes in the fashion of "Lend me your ears. Shakespeare. Hem!" or "Verbum sat. Horace. Hem!" The surname "Pangloss" is derived from the character of that name in the 1759 novel Candide by Voltaire, the personal tutor of the main character Candide.
- August – The British Home Office sends an agent to Nether Stowey to investigate Coleridge and Wordsworth who are suspected of being French spies.
- October – Coleridge composes the poem Kubla Khan in an opium-induced dream, writing down only a fragment of it on waking.
- November 1 – Jane Austen's father writes to London bookseller Thomas Cadell to ask if he is interested in seeing the manuscript of Jane's recently completed novel First Impressions (later re-titled Pride and Prejudice); Cadell declines.
- November – Wordsworth suggests to Coleridge the theme of The Rime of the Ancient Mariner on a walk in the Quantocks.
- December 24 – Walter Scott marries Charlotte Carpenter at St Mary's Church, Carlisle. The couple immediately move to a new home at 50 George Street, Edinburgh.
- Hatchards bookshop is founded in London's Piccadilly by John Hatchard; it continues to trade on the same site into the 21st century.

== New books ==
=== Fiction ===
- "Mrs Carver" (perhaps Anthony Carlisle) – The Horrors of Oakendale Abbey
- Hannah Webster Foster (anonymously) – The Coquette, or the History of Eliza Wharton
- Friedrich Hölderlin – Hyperion, volume 1
- Frances Margaretta Jacson (anonymously) – Disobedience
- Jan Potocki – The Manuscript Found in Saragossa
- Ann Radcliffe – The Italian, or the Confessional of the Black Penitents
- Marquis de Sade – L'Histoire de Juliette
- Royall Tyler – The Algerine Captive

=== Children ===
- Charlotte Palmer – A Newly-Invented Copybook

=== Drama ===
- Samuel Taylor Coleridge – Osorio
- George Colman – The Heir at Law
- Richard Cumberland
  - False Impressions
  - The Last of the Family
- Thomas John Dibdin – Sadak and Kalasrade
- Elizabeth Inchbald – Wives as They Were and Maids as They Are
- Robert Jephson – Julia
- Matthew Lewis – The Minister: A Tragedy, in five acts
- Thomas Morton – A Cure for the Heart Ache
- Frederick Reynolds
  - Cheap Living
  - The Will

=== Non-fiction ===
- Thomas Bewick – History of British Birds vol. 1
- François-René de Chateaubriand – Essai sur les révolutions
- The Columbian Orator
- Johann Gottlieb Fichte – Foundations of Natural Right
- Lorenzo Mascheroni – Geometria del Compasso
- Thomas Paine – Agrarian Justice
- Friedrich Wilhelm Joseph Schelling – Die Weltseele (Soul of the World)

== Births ==
- January 10 - Maria da Felicidade do Couto Browne, early Portuguese woman poet (died 1861)
- January 28 – Félix Tanco, Colombian-born Cuban poet, and novelist (died 1871)
- March 3 – Emily Eden, English poet and novelist (died 1869)
- March 13 – Charles de Rémusat, French politician and writer (died 1875)
- March 27 – Alfred de Vigny, French poet (died 1863)
- April 12 – Ernst August Hagen, Prussian art writer and novelist (died 1880)
- June 14 – Jules Lefèvre-Deumier, French author and poet (died 1857)
- July 12 – Adele Schopenhauer, German novelist and paper-cut artist (died 1849)
- August 30 – Mary Shelley, English novelist (died 1851)
- September 2 – William Stephenson, English Geordie printer, publisher, auctioneer, poet and songwriter (died 1838)
- September 16 – Anthony Panizzi, Italian-born English scholar and librarian (died 1879)
- September 28 – Sophie von Knorring (Sophie Margareta Zelow), Swedish novelist (died 1848)
- October 31 – Jacob Bailey Moore, American journalist and historical writer (died 1853)
- November 17 – Saint-Amand, French playwright (died 1885)
- December 13 – Heinrich Heine, German poet (died 1856)
- December 31 – North Ludlow Beamish, Irish military writer and antiquary (died 1872)
- Unknown date – Charlotte Barton, Australian children's author (died 1867)
- Approximate date – Thomas Cautley Newby, English publisher (died 1882)

== Deaths ==
- March 2 – Horace Walpole, novelist and antiquarian (born 1717)
- April 7 – William Mason, English poet and editor (born 1724)
- May 27 – François-Noël Babeuf, French journalist and political agitator (executed, born 1760)
- July 9 – Edmund Burke, Irish-born philosopher (born 1729)
- September 10 – Mary Wollstonecraft, English philosopher (born 1759)
- October 4 – Johann Christian Georg Bodenschatz, German Protestant theologian (born 1717)
- December – Mathurin-Léonard Duphot, French poet (shot dead, born 1769)
- Unknown date – Yuan Mei (袁枚), Chinese poet, diarist and gastronome (born 1716)
