= John Waddy (actor) =

Irish stage actor and theatre manager

John Waddy (1751–1814) was an Irish stage actor and theatre manager. Originally, intended for a career in law, he was acting at Dublin's Smock Alley Theatre by 1774, combining this with appearances at Irish and English provincial theatres. From 1782 to 1796, he was a regular at the Theatre Royal, Norwich. He was then engaged by the Theatre Royal, Covent Garden in London making his debut there on 5 October 1796, under the management of Thomas Harris. He acted there and at Haymarket over the next decade and a half. He particularly specialised in playing Stage Irishman and also took over many roles when John Quick left Covent Garden. His second wife, billed as Mrs. Waddy, acted with him in London for several years. He departed from the Covent Garden company in 1810, and worked for a while at the Surrey Theatre south of the River Thames. He died in Oakingham in Berkshire on 12 April 1814.

== Selected roles ==
- Norberry in Wives as They Were and Maids as They Are by Elizabeth Inchbald (1797)
- Farmer Oatland in A Cure For The Heart Ache by Thomas Morton (1797)
- Gerald in Speed the Plough by Thomas Morton (1798)
- Lawley in The Wise Man of the East by Elizabeth Inchbald (1799)
- Lawyer Circuit in The Birth Day by Thomas John Dibdin (1799)
- Wensel in Joanna of Montfaucon by Richard Cumberland (1800)
- Daniel Dowlas in The Heir at Law by George Colman (1800)
- Falstaff in Henry IV, Part I by William Shakespeare (1801)
- Cursitor in Folly as it Flies by Frederick Reynolds (1801)
- Humphrey Dobbins in The Poor Gentleman by George Colman (1801)
- Gareb in The Voice of Nature by James Boaden (1802)
- Father Brazil in Alfonso, King of Castile by Matthew Lewis (1802)
- Lord Fitz-Balaam in John Bull by George Colman (1803)
- Landlord in The Delinquent by Frederick Reynolds (1805)
- Hogmore in Who Wants a Guinea? by George Colman the Younger (1805)
- Mr Grumley in Errors Excepted by Thomas Dibdin (1807)

== Bibliography ==
- Highfill, Philip H, Burnim, Kalman A. & Langhans, Edward A. A Biographical Dictionary of Actors, Actresses, Musicians, Dancers, Managers, and Other Stage Personnel in London, 1660-1800: Abaco to Belfille. SIU Press, 1978.
- Johnston, Roy. The Musical Life of Nineteenth-Century Belfast. Routledge, 2017.
