= John Henry Johnstone =

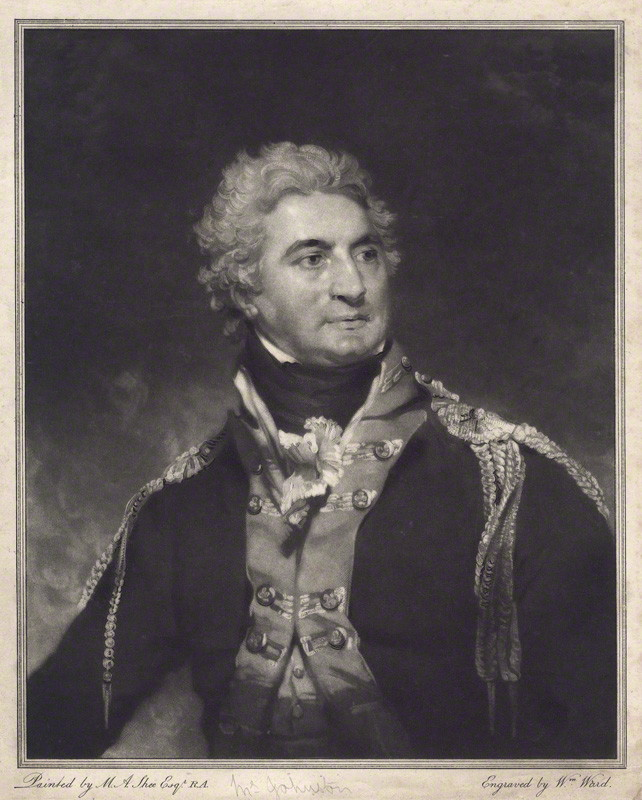
John Henry Johnstone, in character as Sir Callaghan O'Brallaghan in Charles Macklin's Love à-la-Mode

John Henry Johnstone (1749–1828), also known as 'Jack' Johnstone or 'Irish' Johnstone, was an Irish actor, comedian and singer. He was a notable performer of Stage Irishman roles.

== Life ==
Johnstone was born probably on 1 August 1749, in the horse-barracks in Kilkenny, where his father, a quartermaster in a dragoon regiment, was then quartered. He joined a cavalry regiment, and won some reputation among his comrades for his sweet tenor voice. It is said that on his discharge his colonel recommended him for his singing in a letter to Thomas Ryder, manager of the Smock Alley Theatre in Dublin. Here in any case Johnstone made his first stage appearance, about 1773, as Lionel in Lionel and Clarissa (Charles Dibdin and Isaac Bickerstaffe). He was engaged for three years, and remained from seven to ten years on the Irish stage, singing principal tenor parts.

== The London stage ==
On the recommendation of Charles Macklin, Johnstone and his wife were engaged by Thomas Harris at Covent Garden Theatre for three years, and Johnstone was well received on his début as Lionel on 2 October 1783.

=== William Shield operas ===
His association with the operas of William Shield commenced early. He appeared (as Dermott) with John Edwin and Charles Bannister in The Poor Soldier (John O'Keeffe's words) in 1783: in 1784 in Shield's Robin Hood, his duet with Charles Bannister was 'unanimously encored', and later that year he sang "Let fame sound the trumpet" in Shield's Fontainblau with great success: he and Bannister sang airs and duets at a dinner with Shield a few days afterwards. In The Choleric Fathers (1785), (a Shield opera to a Thomas Holcroft libretto) he was Don Fernando in a cast led by John Quick. Shield's 1786 collaboration with O'Keeffe, Love in a Camp saw him as Captain Patrick, and Love and War (1787) (a Robert Jephson script), again with Quick, gave him Captain Farquar. In The Farmer (1787) Johnstone was Valentine to Charles Bannister's Farmer Blackberry, and in The Highland Reel (1788) he was Sandy to Bannister's Serjeant Jack: in 1790 he was Colonel Lefort to Bannister's Peter I in The Czar. All three were O'Keeffe texts set by Shield.

1790 also saw Johnstone as Raymond to Bannister's Duran in Shield's The Crusade to a Frederick Reynolds script. In the 1791 premiere of The Woodman (text by Dudley), with Quick, Bannister, Incledon and Mrs Martyr, he played Captain O'Donnel 'with great vivacity and spirit, and gave his Irish ballad with peculiar felicity', though when recalled it was to watch mutely while Incledon gave encores. He was Sergeant of Grenadiers in To Arms! in 1793, Dorimund in Travellers in Switzerland in 1794, and in 1795, in the afterpiece The Irish Mimic, or Blunders at Brighton (Shield and O'Keeffe) as Parrot he played an Irish character who failed completely to mimic certain birds and animals (but sang beautifully).

Johnstone and William Shield, Charles Incledon, Charles Dignum, Charles Bannister, Charles Ashley and William Parke (oboeist) in 1793 formed themselves into 'The Glee Club', a set which met on Sunday evenings during the season at the Garrick's Head Coffee House in Bow Street, once a fortnight, for singing among themselves and dining together. A project to erect a bust to Dr Thomas Arne, which this group proposed to fund by charitable performances, was vetoed by the management of Covent Garden. It is told that Johnstone was a regular drinking companion of Charles Incledon's at 'a public house of the lowest class', The Brown Bear in Bow Street.

=== Samuel Arnold and others ===
Johnstone was also associated with the operas of Samuel Arnold, and his appearance in 1789 performances of Inkle and Yarico (1787), supporting Mrs Billington, is described by Parke. He featured in The Surrender of Calais (text by George Colman the younger) at the Little Theatre, Haymarket, in 1791, and was Harry Furnace in Warner's The Armourer at Covent Garden in 1793. He appeared (as Captain O'Leary) with Incledon in William Reeve's British Fortitude and Hibernian Friendship in 1794, and was O'Curragh in Arnold's Zorinski (1795) and Captain Macgallaher in his Bannian Day (1796), again at the Haymarket. Britain's Brave Tars!, a one-act farce by Thomas Attwood to an O'Keeffe text, had Incledon as Lieutenant Tafferel and Johnstone as Pat Plunket (who sang "Brave Betty was a maiden") in the 1797 Covent Garden premiere. In 1798 he was The Bard in the premiere of Arnold's Cambro-Britons at the Haymarket. Until 1803 he remained at Covent Garden, with occasional summer seasons at the Haymarket Theatre. He performed Macheath in the Beggar's Opera, and once appeared as Lucy at the Haymarket in a production with John Bannister, when the male and female parts were reversed. He took various other operatic tenor leads: however his singing voice did not wear well, and he gradually abandoned operatic parts.

Johnstone specialised in Irish characters in comic drama as well as in the opera. He was originally encouraged to this by Macklin, who marked him out for the role of Sir Callaghan O'Brallachan in Love à-la-Mode. This was a turning-point in the drama, because John Moody was past his best and William Egan lacked the necessary whimsy for such roles. 'His perfect brogue, his exquisitely comic manner, and his agreeable voice in singing, formed an irresistible charm, which was much enhanced by his handsome person and free military address.' He excelled in roles such as Sir Lucius O'Trigger in The Rivals, Major O'Flaherty (The West Indian), Dennis Brulgruddery (John Bull by George Colman the younger), Looney Mactwolter (in The Review, in which he was 'irresistibly ludicrous'), and Teague (The Committee, by Sir Robert Howard). He became known as "Irish" Johnstone, and, on his visiting Dublin in 1803, he was welcomed as a representative of authentic Irishmen on the stage.

=== Move to Drury Lane, 1803 ===
Johnstone joined Joseph George Holman's protest against the new regulations at Covent Garden Theatre, and accepted an engagement at Drury Lane in 1803, where he often shared the stage with John Bannister. He appeared for the first time onstage there on 20 September 1803 as Murtoch Delany (Irishman in London, by William Macready the elder). In the same season he played Sergeant Armagh in Cobb's The Wife of Two Husbands, and Brian O'Bradleigh in Allingham's Hearts of Oak. He appeared as Teague in T. Knight's The Honest Thieves at the final benefit for Charles Bannister in 1804. He was an Irish interpreter in Cherry's The Travellers in January 1806. He acted at Drury Lane for the rest of his career, though he returned to Covent Garden as Sir Callaghan on the occasion of Charles Mathews's benefit, 8 June 1814, and again in 1820.

== Last years ==
At Covent Garden Johnstone's benefit and last appearance (as Brulgruddery) took place on 28 June 1820. He bade farewell to the stage at Liverpool in August, but appeared once again at a charity performance at Drury Lane on 18 May 1822.

Johnstone died at his house in Tavistock Row, Covent Garden, on 26 December 1828, and was buried in a vault in the eastern angle of St. Paul's Church, Covent Garden.

== Family ==
Johnstone married, first, Ann Maria, the daughter of Colonel Poitier, governor of Kilmainham gaol; she was an operatic singer, and instructed him in music, but they separated a few months after marriage. For a time Sarah Maria Wilson was his mistress. Secondly, he married Ann Bolton, the daughter of a wine merchant, with whom he eloped. Their only daughter Susan Johnstone was an actress who married James William Wallack. Johnstone left the bulk of his property (£12,000) in trust to her children. Susan's eldest son was John Johnstone Wallack.

== Selected roles ==
- Captain Farquhar in The Campaign by Robert Jephson (1784)
- MacPharo in The Ton by Eglantine Wallace (1788)
- MacDermot in The School for Arrogance by Thomas Holcroft (1791)
- O'Carrollin The Surrender of Calais by George Colman the Younger (1791)
- O'Whack in Notoriety by Frederick Reynolds (1791)
- Murtoch Delany in The Irishman in London by William Macready the Elder (1792)
- Tully in The London Hermit by John O'Keeffe (1793)
- Captain Mullinahack in The World in a Village by John O'Keeffe (1793)
- Killeavy in The Bank Note by William Macready the Elder (1795)
- Timolin in Life's Vagaries by John O'Keeffe (1795)
- O'Curragh in Zorinski by Thomas Morton (1795)
- McQuery in The Way to Get Married by Thomas Morton (1796)
- Kenrick in The Heir at Law by George Colman the Younger (1797)
- O'Turloch in Cambro-Britons by James Boaden (1798)
- Harry Bertram in The Birth Day by Thomas John Dibdin (1799)
- Dennis Brulgruddery in John Bull by George Colman the Younger (1803)
- Brian O'Bradleigh in Hearts of Oak by John Allingham (1803)
- Larry MacBoof in The Land We Live In by Francis Ludlow Holt (1804)
- Patrick O'Shatter in A Prior Claim by Henry James Pye (1805)
- Rooney in The Jew of Mogadore by Richard Cumberland (1808)
- Sir Leinster Kildare in The Siege of St Quintin by Theodore Hook (1808)
- O'Harrolan in Grieving's a Folly by Richard Leigh (1809)
- Barny in Where to Find a Friend by Richard Leigh (1811)
- O'Shanauhan in Ourselves by Marianne Chambers (1811)

== Notes ==
Attribution

This article incorporates text from a publication now in the public domain: Lee, Sidney, ed. (1892). "Johnstone, John Henry". Dictionary of National Biography. Vol. 30. London: Smith, Elder & Co.
