= Joanna of Montfaucon =

1800 play

- Original language: English
- Written by: Richard Cumberland
- Genre: Historical
- Setting: Switzerland, fourteenth century

Premiere
- Date: 16 January 1800
- Place: Theatre Royal, Covent Garden, London

Joanna of Montfaucon is an 1800 historical play by the British playwright Richard Cumberland. It premiered at the Theatre Royal, Covent Garden in London on 16 January 1800 and was inspired by a work by German writer August von Kotzebue. The original cast included Maria Ann Pope as Joanna, Alexander Pope as Albert, Lord of Thurn, Joseph George Holman as Lazarra, Charles Incledon as Darbony, John Waddy as Wensel, Henry Erskine Johnston as Philip, John Emery as Guntram, Charles Murray as Hermit, Joseph Shepherd Munden as Wolf, Thomas King as Ulrick, William Claremont as Mountaineer, Charles Klanert as Soldier and Nannette Johnston as Eloisa.

== Bibliography ==
- Burwick, Frederick. A History of Romantic Literature. John Wiley & Sons, 2019.
- Dircks, Richard J. Richard Cumberland. Twayne Publishers, 1976.
- Greene, John C. Theatre in Dublin, 1745-1820: A Calendar of Performances, Volume 6. Lexington Books, 2011.
- Nicoll, Allardyce. A History of English Drama 1660–1900: Volume III. Cambridge University Press, 2009.
- Hogan, C.B (ed.) The London Stage, 1660–1800: Volume V. Southern Illinois University Press, 1968.
