= Mary Ann Davenport =

British Shakespearean actress

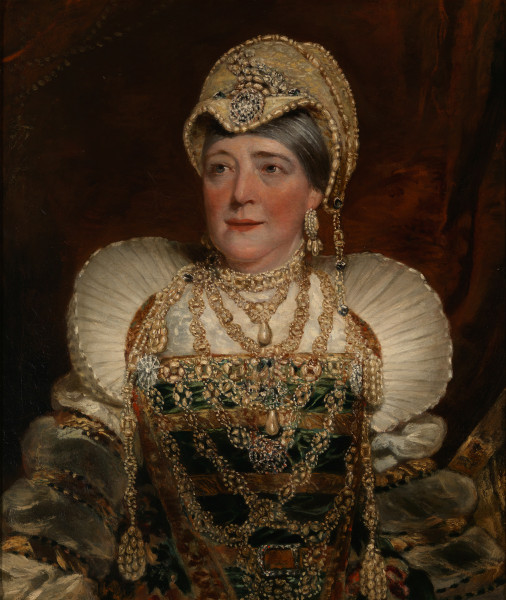
- Mary Ann Davenport in "Henry VIII"
- Born: 1759; Launceston, Cornwall
- Died: 8 May 1843 (aged 83–84); Brompton, London
- Occupation: Shakespearean actress

Mary Ann Davenport (née Harvey; c. 1759 – 8 May 1843) was a British Shakespearean actress.

== Life ==
She was born at Launceston, Cornwall. She first appeared on the stage at Bath in December 1784, as Lappet in Henry Fielding's The Miser. After two seasons at Bath she performed in Exeter and Bristol, where in 1786 she married George Gosling Davenport (1758?–1814), a provincial actor. They later worked at the Crow Street Theatre in Dublin, and at Covent Garden. In 1806 she appeared as Lady Denny in Henry VIII (play) with Sarah Siddons as Queen Katherine, John Philip Kemble as Cardinal Wolsey. Her husband’s acting talents were unequal to hers, though he was regarded as a useful member of the company, serving as secretary to the Covent Garden Theatrical Fund until he retired in 1812. After his death, Mary Ann lived in seclusion with her daughter.

In 1817 she appeared again as Lady Denny in Henry VIII when the painting by Benjamin Burnell was created for an exhibition at the Royal Academy of Arts. She retired from the stage on 25 May 1830.

She died at her house, 17 St Michael's Place, Brompton, London, on 8 May 1843, and was buried at St Paul's, Covent Garden.

== Selected roles ==
- Lady Supple in The Bank Note by William Macready the Elder (1795)
- Lady Project in Speculation by Frederick Reynolds (1795)
- Lady Sorel in The Way to Get Married by Thomas Morton (1796)
- Lady Duberly in The Heir at Law by George Colman the Younger (1797)
- Mrs Buckram in False Impressions by Richard Cumberland (1797)
- Dame Ashfield in Speed the Plough by Thomas Morton (1798)
- Lady Mary Diamond in The Wise Man of the East by Elizabeth Inchbald (1799)
- Mrs Moral in The Birth Day by Thomas John Dibdin (1799)
- Mrs Dazzle in Management by Frederick Reynolds (1799)
- Miss Liberal in The School for Prejudice by Thomas Dibdin (1801)
- Bendetta in The Voice of Nature by James Boaden (1802)
- Mrs Bulgruddery in John Bull by George Colman the Younger (1803)
- Mrs Gurnet in The Blind Bargain by Frederick Reynolds (1804)
- Mrs Reference in The Will for the Deed by Thomas Dibdin (1804)
- Mrs Nicely in The School of Reform by Thomas Morton (1805)
- Mrs Sarah Mortland in To Marry or Not to Marry by Elizabeth Inchbald (1805)
- Mrs Moreen in Town and Country by Thomas Morton (1807)
- Deborah in Begone Dull Care by Frederick Reynolds (1808)
- Monica in The Foundling of the Forest by William Dimond (1809)
- Mrs Leech in The Gazette Extraordinary by Joseph George Holman (1811)
- Dame Broadcast in Education by Thomas Morton (1813)
