= The Birth-day =

1799 play

- Original language: English
- Written by: Thomas John Dibdin
- Genre: Comedy

Premiere
- Date: 8 April 1799
- Place: Theatre Royal, Covent Garden, London

The Birth Day or The Birth-day is a 1799 comedy play by the British author Thomas John Dibdin. It was based on the work Die Versöhnung by the German author August von Kotzebue, which Dibdin translated and rewrote for the English stage. It premiered at the Theatre Royal, Covent Garden on 8 April 1799. The Covent Garden cast included Joseph Shepherd Munden as Captain Bertram, John Fawcett as Jack Junk, John Henry Johnstone as Harry Bertram, Charles Murray as Mr. Bertram, John Waddy as Lawyer Circuit, Jane Pope as Emma and Mary Ann Davenport as Mrs Moral. Fawcett's character Jack Junk, a sailor, was a reprisal from the popular 1798 musical The Mouth of the Nile by Dibdin. The Irish premiere took place at the Crow Street Theatre in Dublin on 25 November 1799.

== Bibliography ==
- Greene, John C. Theatre in Dublin, 1745-1820: A Calendar of Performances, Volume 6. Lexington Books, 2011.
- Nicoll, Allardyce. A History of English Drama 1660–1900: Volume III. Cambridge University Press, 2009.
- Hogan, C.B (ed.) The London Stage, 1660–1800: Volume V. Southern Illinois University Press, 1968.
