= Maria Gibbs =

British actress (c.1770–1850)

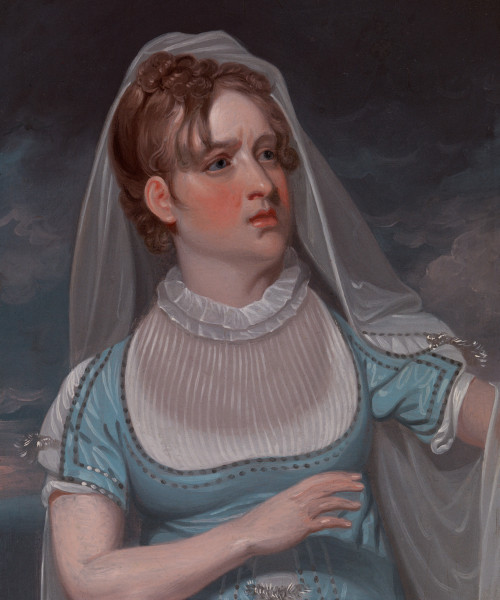
- Mary (Maria) Gibbs as Selina
- Born: Maria Logan c. 1770
- Died: 1850
- Occupation: Actress

Maria Gibbs (born about 1770) (fl. 1783–1844) was a British actress.

== Life ==
She was one of three sisters who became actors. Her Irish father was associated with the theatre. John Palmer, her godfather, brought her on the stage at the Haymarket, where, on 18 June 1783, she made her first appearance as Sally in Man and Wife by George Colman the Elder. After one season at the Haymarket, Miss Logan accompanied Palmer in his unfortunate expedition to the Royalty Theatre in Wellclose Square. At the opening of the house on 20 June 1787, as Mrs. Gibbs, she played Biddy in David Garrick's Miss in her Teens.

At the Royalty she played the principal characters in the serious pantomimes, given to evade the privileges of the patent houses. While at this theatre, Mrs. Gibbs came on the stage as the Comic Muse through a trap and gave an imitation of Delpini. Her support of Palmer offended the managers, who boycotted her, in effect. On 15 June 1793, at the Haymarket she played Bridget in The Chapter of Accidents by Sophia Lee. This was announced as her first appearance at the theatre. Oxberry says she had played at both Drury Lane and Covent Garden previously.

A close intimacy sprang up between George Colman the Younger and Mrs. Gibbs, and she was identified in her will as Mary Colman, widow. Allegedly, Colman wrote the parts of Cicely in The Heir at Law (Haymarket, 15 July 1797); Annette in Blue Devils (Covent Garden, 24 April 1798); Grace Gaylove in the Review (Haymarket, 2 Sept. 1800); and Mary in John Bull (Covent Garden, 5 March 1803) for her.

In these characters and in others, such as Katherine in Katherine and Petruchio and Miss Hardcastle in She Stoops to Conquer’' she obtained reputation as a second Mrs. Jordan. She made occasional appearances at Drury Lane and Covent Garden, but the Haymarket remained her home. Here, in late years, she played parts such as Mrs. Candour and Miss Sterling in The Clandestine Marriage.

Oxberry speaks of her as possessing genius, talent, and industry, adding that her Curiosa in the ‘Cabinet’ is one of the richest specimens of extant comic acting. In such parts as Nell in The Devil to Pay she rivalled Mrs. Davison or Fanny Kelly, though surpassed both in vivacity and the "fullness and jollity" of her voice. Although she was not much of a singer, she had a peculiarly pleasing voice. Physically, she had a plump figure, a light complexion, and blue eyes.

The Monthly Mirror reported in August 1800 that, "in consequence of the secession of Mrs. Stephen Kemble, she has deservedly occupied all characters of tender simplicity and unaffected elegance." She won the high esteem of her contemporaries, and the stories told concerning her are mostly to her credit. She appears to have been generous in disposition, and to have befriended her fellow-actresses.

After Colman's death in 1836, she lived in retirement in Brighton, and died at her home, Burlington Cottage, on 6 June 1850. In her will she left valuable personal items of jewellery to her son John George Nathaniel Gibbes, daughter-in-law Elizabeth and grandson George Harvey Gibbes, but the residue of her estate was bequeathed to her friend Mary Ann Griesbach "for her own sole and separate use and independent of her husband".

== Selected roles ==
- Lady Jane Danvers in The Box-Lobby Challenge by Richard Cumberland (1794)
- Blanch in The Iron Chest by George Colman the Younger (1796)
- Cicely Homespun in The Heir at Law by George Colman the Younger (1797)
- Lady Griffith's Shade in Cambro-Britons by James Boaden (1798)
- Dorothy in Laugh When You Can by Frederick Reynolds (1798)
- Georgiana in Folly as it Flies by Frederick Reynolds (1801)
- Emily Worthington in The Poor Gentleman by George Colman the Younger (1801)
- Lilla in The Voice of Nature by James Boaden (1802)
- Mary Thornberry in John Bull by George Colman the Younger (1803)
- Lady Delamare in The Three Per Cents by Frederick Reynolds (1803)
- Mrs Villars in The Blind Bargain by Frederick Reynolds (1804)
- Nancy in Guilty or Not Guilty by Thomas Dibdin (1804)
- Mrs St Clair in The School of Reform by Thomas Morton (1805)
- Mrs Aubrey in The Delinquent by Frederick Reynolds (1805)
- Fanny in Who Wants a Guinea? by George Colman the Younger (1805)
- Jenny in Five Miles Off by Thomas Dibdin (1806)
- Fanny Freeman in Errors Excepted by Thomas Dibdin (1807)
- Geraldine in The Foundling of the Forest by William Dimond (1809)

== Sources ==
- Joseph Knight, rev. J. Gilliland. "Gibbs, Maria (1770–1850)". Oxford Dictionary of National Biography (online ed.). Oxford University Press. doi:10.1093/ref:odnb/10602. (Subscription, Wikipedia Library access or UK public library membership required.)
