= Life's Vagaries =

1795 play

- Written by: John O'Keeffe
- Original language: English
- Genre: Comedy
- Setting: A town near the coast

Premiere
- Date premiered: 19 March 1795
- Place premiered: Theatre Royal, Covent Garden, London

Life's Vagaries is a 1795 comedy play by the Irish writer John O'Keeffe. It was first performed at the Theatre Royal, Covent Garden in London on 19 March 1795. The original cast included John Bernard as Lord Torrendel, William Thomas Lewis as Lord Arthur D'Aumerle, Joseph Shepherd Munden as Sir Hans Burgess, John Quick as Dickins, John Fawcett as George Burgess, John Henry Johnstone as Timolin, Edward Townsend as Robin, Charles Farley as Leillet, Tryphosa Jane Wallis as Augusta and Jane Pope as Lady Torrendel. Its first Dublin performance was at the Crow Street Theatre on 7 January 1796.

== Bibliography ==
- Greene, John C. Theatre in Dublin, 1745-1820: A Calendar of Performances, Volume 6. Lexington Books, 2011.
- Nicoll, Allardyce. A History of English Drama 1660–1900: Volume III. Cambridge University Press, 2009.
- Hogan, C.B (ed.) The London Stage, 1660–1800: Volume V. Southern Illinois University Press, 1968.
