= Management (play) =

1799 play

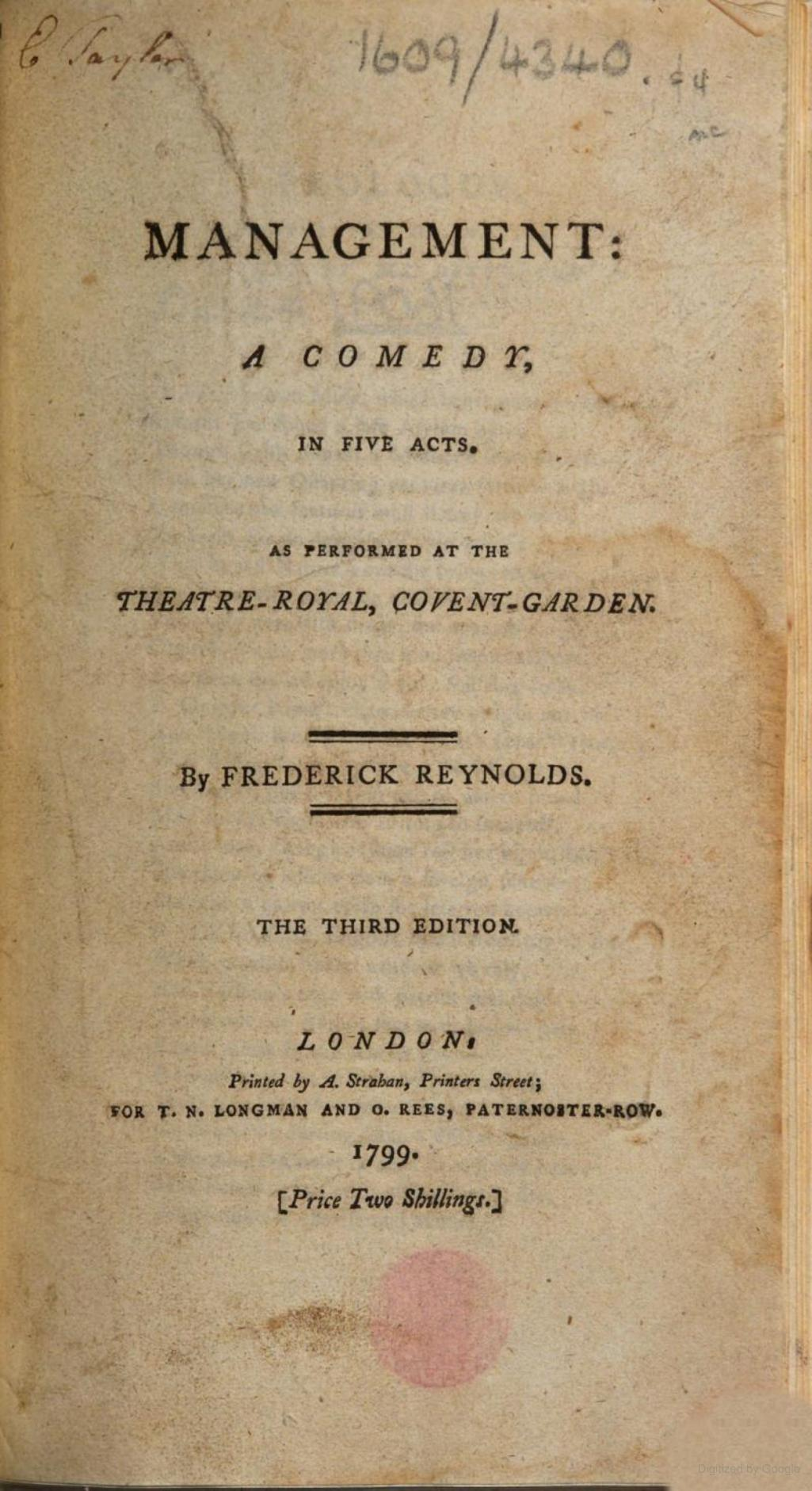
- Written by: Frederick Reynolds
- Original language: English
- Genre: Comedy
- Setting: England, present day

Premiere
- Date premiered: 31 October 1799
- Place premiered: Theatre Royal, Covent Garden, London

Management is a 1799 comedy play by the British writer Frederick Reynolds. It premiered at the Theatre Royal, Covent Garden in London on 31 October 1799. The original cast included William Thomas Lewis as Captain Lavish, John Fawcett as Mist, Joseph Shepherd Munden as Worry, Alexander Pope as Sir Hervey Sutherland, Charles Farley as Alltrade, Charles Klanert as Frank, Samuel Simmons as Stopgap, George Davenport as Geoffrey, Mary Ann Davenport as Mrs Dazzle and Maria Ann Pope as Juliana. The Dublin premiere was at the Crow Street Theatre on 13 February 1800.

== Bibliography ==
- Greene, John C. Theatre in Dublin, 1745-1820: A Calendar of Performances, Volume 6. Lexington Books, 2011.
- Nicoll, Allardyce. A History of English Drama 1660–1900: Volume IV. Cambridge University Press, 2009.
