= The Wise Man of the East =

1799 play

- Original language: English
- Written by: Elizabeth Inchbald
- Genre: Comedy
- Setting: London, present day

Premiere
- Date: 30 November 1799
- Place: Theatre Royal, Covent Garden, London

The Wise Man of the East is a 1799 comedy play by the British writer Elizabeth Inchbald, inspired by an earlier German work by August von Kotzebue. It premiered at the Theatre Royal, Covent Garden in London on 30 November 1799 and was performed thirteen times that season. The original cast included Joseph Shepherd Munden as Ava Thoanoa, William Thomas Lewis as Claransforth, Charles Murray as Metland, Henry Erskine Johnston as Ensign Metland, Thomas Knight as Timothy Starch, John Waddy as Lawley, George Davenport as Bankwell, Charles Klanert as Waitby, Mary Ann Davenport as Lady Mary Diamond, Isabella Mattocks as Rachel Starch and Nannette Johnston as Ruth Starch.

== Bibliography ==
- Nicoll, Allardyce. A History of English Drama 1660–1900: Volume III. Cambridge University Press, 2009.
- Hogan, C.B (ed.) The London Stage, 1660–1800: Volume V. Southern Illinois University Press, 1968.
- Robertson, Ben P. Elizabeth Inchbald's Reputation: A Publishing and Reception History. Routledge, 2015.
