= Boaden =

Boaden is a surname, and refer to:

- Helen Boaden (born 1956), Former Director of BBC Radio
- James Boaden (1762–1839), English biographer, dramatist, and journalist
- John Boaden (1792/3–1839), English portrait painter, son of James Boaden
- Russell Boaden, Australian Paralympic sailor from Australia
