= Who Wants a Guinea? =

1805 play

- Original language: English
- Written by: George Colman the Younger
- Genre: Comedy
- Setting: Yorkshire, present day

Premiere
- Date: 18 April 1805
- Place: Theatre Royal, Covent Garden, London

Who Wants a Guinea? is an 1805 comedy play by the British writer George Colman the Younger. It premiered at the Theatre Royal, Covent Garden in London on 18 April 1805. Less successful than his previous work John Bull, it lasted for nine performances. The original cast included John Philip Kemble as Barford, Joseph Shepherd Munden as Torrent, William Chapman as Heartly, Charles Kemble as Henry, John Waddy as Hogmore, John Fawcett as Solomon Gundy, Samuel Simmons as Jonathon Oldskirt, William Thomas Lewis as Sir Larry Mac Murragh, John Emery as Andrew Bang, George Davenport as Carrydot, Maria Gibbs as Fanny and Isabella Mattocks as Mrs Glastonbury. The Irish premiere was at the Crow Street Theatre in Dublin on 25 May 1805.

== Bibliography ==
- Greene, John C. Theatre in Dublin, 1745-1820: A Calendar of Performances, Volume 6. Lexington Books, 2011.
- Nicoll, Allardyce. A History of Early Nineteenth Century Drama 1800-1850. Cambridge University Press, 1930.
