= The Gazette Extraordinary =

1811 play

- Original language: English
- Written by: Joseph George Holman
- Genre: Comedy
- Setting: England, Present day

Premiere
- Date: 23 April 1811
- Place: Theatre Royal, Covent Garden, London

The Gazette Extraordinary is a comedy play by the British writer Joseph George Holman, published and first performed in 1811. It premiered at the Theatre Royal, Covent Garden in London on 23 April 1811 The original cast included Charles Mayne Young as Lord De Mallory, Joseph Shepherd Munden as Heartworth, William Barrymore as William Clayton, John Fawcett as Doctor Suitall, Charles Murray as Randall, Nannette Johnston as Lady Julia Sandford, Mary Catherine Bolton as Miss Alford, Mary Ann Davenport as Mrs Leech and Sarah Booth as Ellen Meredith. It was acted eleven times during its initial run.

== Bibliography ==
- Genest, John. Some Account of the English Stage: From the Restoration in 1660 to 1830, Volume 8. H.E. Carrington, 1832.
- Greene, John C. Theatre in Dublin, 1745-1820: A Calendar of Performances, Volume 6. Lexington Books, 2011.
- Nicoll, Allardyce. A History of Early Nineteenth Century Drama 1800-1850. Cambridge University Press, 1930.
