= The School for Prejudice =

1801 play

- Original language: English
- Written by: Thomas John Dibdin
- Genre: Comedy
- Setting: England, present day

Premiere
- Date: 3 January 1801
- Place: Theatre Royal, Covent Garden, London

The School for Prejudice is an 1801 comedy play by the English writer Thomas John Dibdin. It premiered at the Theatre Royal, Covent Garden in London on 3 January 1801. The original cast included Joseph Shepherd Munden as Old Liberal, William Thomas Lewis as Frank Liberal, John Fawcett as Ephraim, Charles Murray as Counsellor Friendly, Henry Erskine Johnston as Mildmay, John Emery as John Grouse, Charles Farley as Chevy Chase, Samuel Simmons as Parchment, George Davenport as Landlord, Frances Chapman as Mrs Howard, Harriet Siddons as Marian and Mary Ann Davenport as Miss Liberal. The Irish premiere took place at the Crow Street Theatre in Dublin on 19 February 1802.

== Bibliography ==
- Greene, John C. Theatre in Dublin, 1745-1820: A Calendar of Performances, Volume 6. Lexington Books, 2011.
- Nicoll, Allardyce. A History of English Drama 1660–1900: Volume IV. Cambridge University Press, 2009.
