= Vincent De Camp =

British stage actor (1777 – 1839)

Vincent De Camp (1777 – 1839 was a British stage actor.

Of Austrian background, he was the younger brother of the actress Maria Theresa Kemble. He first appeared at Drury Lane in 1792, and joined the company in 1794. He also appeared regularly at the Haymarket Theatre. From 1814 he appeared in provincial theatres and then emigrated to North America where he died, possibly in Texas.

== Selected roles ==
- Servant in Vortigern and Rowena by William Henry Ireland (1796)
- Edward in Hearts of Oak by John Till Allingham (1803)
- Harcourt in The Land We Live In by Francis Ludlow Holt (1804)
- Sir Harry Pointer in Guilty or Not Guilty by Thomas Dibdin (1804)
- Young Freeman in A Prior Claim by Henry James Pye (1805)
- Luckless in Five Miles Off by Thomas Dibdin (1806)
- Young Mannerly in Errors Excepted by Thomas Dibdin (1807)
- Bertrand in The Siege of St Quintin by Theodore Hook (1808)
- Darlington in Ourselves by Marianne Chambers (1811)
- Isidore in Remorse by Samuel Taylor Coleridge (1813)

== Bibliography ==
- Cox, Jeffrey N. & Gamer, Michael. The Broadview Anthology of Romantic Drama. Broadview Press, 2003.
- Highfill, Philip H, Burnim, Kalman A. & Langhans, Edward A. A Biographical Dictionary of Actors, Actresses, Musicians, Dancers, Managers, and Other Stage Personnel in London, 1660-1800. Volume 14. SIU Press, 1973.
