= The Bank Note =

1795 play

- Original language: English
- Written by: William Macready the Elder
- Genre: Comedy

Premiere
- Date: 1 May 1795
- Place: Theatre Royal, Covent Garden, London

The Bank Note: Or Lessons for Ladies is a 1795 comedy play by the Irish writer and actor William Macready the Elder. Its plot draws inspiration from William Taverner's The Artful Husband as well as other earlier plays.

Macready's play premiered at the Theatre Royal, Covent Garden in London on 1 May 1795. The original cast included Macready as Lieutenant Selby, Joseph George Holman as Sir Charles Leslie, James Middleton as Bloomfield, Thomas Hull as Father, John Fawcett as Ned Dash, John Quick as Hale, John Henry Johnstone as Killeavy, Edward Townsend as Tim, Elizabeth Hopkins as Miss Emma Hale, Isabella Mattocks as Mrs Bloomfield, Mary Ann Davenport as Lady Supple and Tryphosa Jane Wallis as Miss Russel. The Irish premiere took at the Crow Street Theatre in Dublin on 22 April 1796.

The play is notable for including the first known printed use of the word 'smithereens':

I join you with all my heart,—and wish he was hang'd, shot, cut in smithereens.

== Bibliography ==
- Greene, John C. Theatre in Dublin, 1745-1820: A Calendar of Performances, Volume 6. Lexington Books, 2011.
- Nicoll, Allardyce. A History of English Drama 1660–1900: Volume III. Cambridge University Press, 2009.
- Hogan, C.B (ed.) The London Stage, 1660–1800: Volume V. Southern Illinois University Press, 1968.
