= Laugh When You Can =

1798 play

- Written by: Frederick Reynolds
- Original language: English
- Genre: Comedy
- Setting: Richmond, Surrey, present day

Premiere
- Date premiered: 8 December 1798
- Place premiered: Theatre Royal, Covent Garden, London

Laugh When You Can is a 1798 comedy play by the British writer Frederick Reynolds. It premiered at the Theatre Royal, Covent Garden in London on 8 December 1798. The original cast included William Thomas Lewis as Gossamer, Joseph Shepherd Munden as Bonus, Joseph George Holman as Mortimer, John Fawcett as Sambo, John Whitfield as Delville, Edward Townsend as Costly, James Thompson as Farmer Blackbrook, Samuel Simmons as Waiter, Mary Ann Pope as Mrs. Mortimer, Maria Gibbs as Dorothy and Isabella Mattocks as Mrs Gloomly. The Irish premiere was at the Crow Street Theatre in Dublin on Dublin on 17 April 1799.

== Bibliography ==
- Greene, John C. Theatre in Dublin, 1745-1820: A Calendar of Performances, Volume 6. Lexington Books, 2011.
- Nicoll, Allardyce. A History of English Drama 1660–1900: Volume IV. Cambridge University Press, 2009.
