= Howard Usher =

English actor

Howard Usher (died. 1802) was an English stage actor of the eighteenth century. He had a lengthy career in London's West End beginning at Drury Lane during the 1739–1740 season. A member of the company, he played smaller, supporting roles in a large number of productions. He also acted at the London fairs during the summer and at Richmond in Surrey and the Jacobs Well Theatre in Bristol. In 1750 he moved to Covent Garden for four years, before returning to Drury Lane for a further four years in 1758. He then moved to Ireland where he spent a number of years at the Smock Alley Theatre and Crow Street Theatre in Dublin and also appeared at the Theatre Royal, Cork. By this time he was married to the actress Maria Usher who appeared with him in Dublin. In 1774 he was recruited by David Garrick to return to Drury Lane. In 1778 he joined the company at the Theatre Royal, Haymarket and remained part of it for the next twenty one years. His final appearance was a reprise of his original role Sir Walter Manny in George Colman the Younger's The Surrender of Calais on 10 September 1799.

== Selected roles ==
- Mittimus in The Fortune Tellers by John Hardham (1740)
- Tackum in The Tragedy of Tragedies by Henry Fielding (1740)
- Mirvan in Tamerlane by Nicholas Rowe (1743)
- Second Ambassador in Regulus by William Havard (1744)
- Poundage in The Provoked Husband by Colley Cibber (1747)
- Buckle in The Suspicious Husband by Benjamin Hoadly (1747)
- Ratcliff in Jane Shore by Nicholas Rowe (1750)
- Heartley in The Reprisal by Tobias Smollett (1757)
- Stockwell in The West Indian by Richard Cumberland (1774)
- Lemos in Braganza by Robert Jephson (1775)
- Henry VIII in Henry VIII by William Shakespeare (1778)
- King Henry in Albina by Hannah Cowley (1779)
- Spurious in A Widow and no Widow by Richard Paul Jodrell (1779)
- Landlord in The Genius of Nonsense by George Colman the Elder (1780)
- Paul Peery in Ways and Means by George Colman the Younger (1788)
- Sir Walter Manny in The Surrender of Calais by George Colman the Younger (1791)
- Barleycorn in The London Hermit by John O'Keeffe (1793)

== Bibliography ==
- Greene, John C. Theatre in Dublin, 1745–1820: A Calendar of Performances. Lehigh University Press, 2011.
- Highfill, Philip H, Burnim, Kalman A. & Langhans, Edward A. A Biographical Dictionary of Actors, Actresses, Musicians, Dancers, Managers & Other Stage Personnel in London, 1660–1800, Volume 15. SIU Press, 1993.
