= Speculation (play) =

1795 play

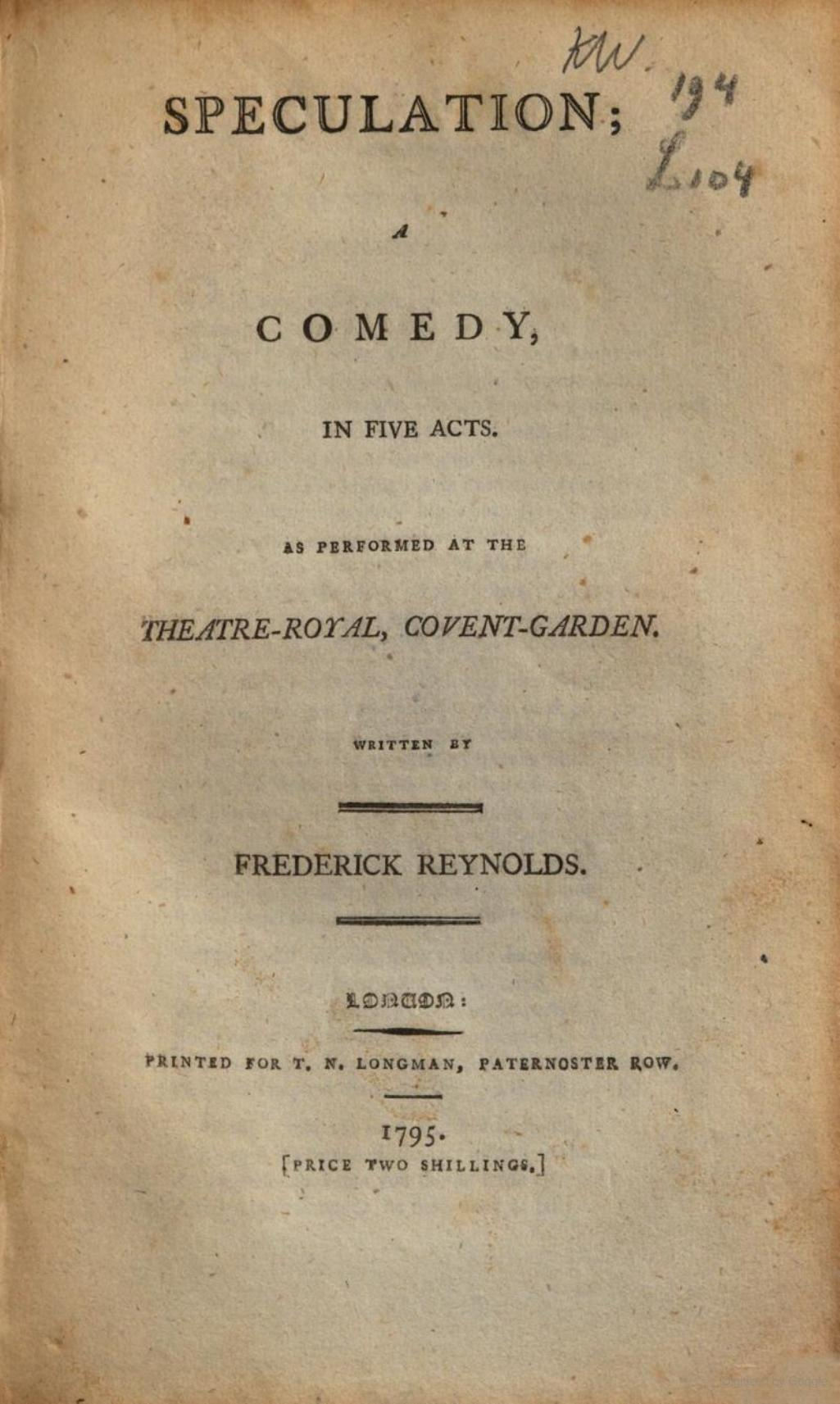
- Written by: Frederick Reynolds
- Original language: English
- Genre: Comedy
- Setting: London, present day

Premiere
- Date premiered: 7 November 1795
- Place premiered: Theatre Royal, Covent Garden, London

Speculation is a 1795 comedy play by the British writer Frederick Reynolds. It premiered at the Theatre Royal, Covent Garden in London on 7 November 1795. The original cast included William Thomas Lewis as Tanjore, John Quick as Alderman Arable, Joseph Shepherd Munden as Project, John Fawcett as Jack Arable, James Middleton as Captain Arable, William Claremont as Sir Fred Faintly, Charles Farley as Vickery, Mary Ann Davenport as Lady Project and Tryphosa Jane Wallis as Emmeline. The Irish premiere took place at the Crow Street Theatre in Dublin on 22 February 1796.

== Bibliography ==
- Greene, John C. Theatre in Dublin, 1745-1820: A Calendar of Performances, Volume 6. Lexington Books, 2011.
- Nicoll, Allardyce. A History of English Drama 1660–1900: Volume IV. Cambridge University Press, 2009.
