= Cambro-Britons =

1798 play

- Written by: James Boaden
- Original language: English
- Genre: Historical

Premiere
- Date premiered: 21 July 1798
- Place premiered: Theatre Royal, Haymarket, London

Cambro-Britons is a 1798 historical play by the English writer James Boaden. It premiered at the Theatre Royal, Haymarket in London on 21 July 1798. The original cast included William Barrymore as Llewellyn, Joseph Shepherd Munden as Shenkin, Robert Palmer as Wadwall, Richard Suett as Gwyn, John Henry Johnstone as O'Turloch, Henry Erskine Johnston as Bard, William Davies as King Edward, Charles Kemble as Prince David, Thomas Caulfield as Mortimer, George Davenport as Hereford, George Wathen as Doorkeeper, Maria Theresa Kemble as Elinor, Maria Gibbs as Lady Griffith's Shade and Maria Bland as Winifred.

== Bibliography ==
- Greene, John C. Theatre in Dublin, 1745-1820: A Calendar of Performances, Volume 6. Lexington Books, 2011.
- Nicoll, Allardyce. A History of English Drama 1660–1900: Volume III. Cambridge University Press, 2009.
- Hogan, C.B (ed.) The London Stage, 1660–1800: Volume V. Southern Illinois University Press, 1968.
