= The Secret Mine =

The Secret Mine: An Equestrian Melo-Drama, in Two Acts is an 1812 equestrian play by Thomas John Dibdin and John Fawcett.

It debuted at Covent Garden on April 24, 1812. It was a popular production, with additional productions in 1814, 1816, and 1819 at Astley's Amphitheatre, and was produced in the United States as early as 1817.

Reviews credited the horses for acting "their parts well, independently of the prompter, and though one of them made a false step, none of them were guilty of a false pronunciation." Just as with the prior year's Timour the Tartar at Covent Garden, critics continued to lament the intrusion of equestrian drama into legitimate venues.

Dibdin wrote in his memoirs that he wrote all the songs and half of the piece, but preferred to remain anonymous as an author. Despite its success, neither Fawcett nor the theatre shared any proceeds, leading Didbin to comment "I am the only one concerned who shared not of the riches of a mine, productive at two theatres, but of which the treasures have remained to me a secret till this day."

The Old Miner Ousted, which debuted at Caernarvon in 1841, has been said to probably be a rewritten version of the play.

== Original London cast ==
Likely was as follows:

- Brunton as Araxa
- Liston as Dimdim
- Barrymore as Ismael
- Chapman as Assad
- Mrs. H. Johnston as Zaphyra
- Miss Feron as Zobeide
- Mrs. Parker as Camilla
