= The School of Reform =

1805 play by Thomas Morton

- Original language: English
- Written by: Thomas Morton
- Genre: Comedy
- Setting: England, Present day

Premiere
- Date: 15 January 1805
- Place: Theatre Royal, Covent Garden, London

The School of Reform is an 1805 comedy play by the British writer Thomas Morton. It premiered at the Theatre Royal, Covent Garden on 15 January 1805. The original cast included George Frederick Cooke as Lord Avondale, Joseph Shepherd Munden as General Tarragan, John Emery as Tyke, Charles Murray as Old Man, Charles Klanert as Peter, Maria Gibbs as Mrs St. Clair, Harriett Litchfield as Mrs Ferment and Mary Ann Davenport as Mrs Nicely. It was later staged at the Crow Street Theatre in Dublin.

== Bibliography ==
- Greene, John C. Theatre in Dublin, 1745-1820: A Calendar of Performances, Volume 6. Lexington Books, 2011.
- Nicoll, Allardyce. A History of Early Nineteenth Century Drama 1800-1850. Cambridge University Press, 1930.
