= Edward Townsend =

Edward Townsend may refer to:

- Edward Townsend (actor) (1766–1809), Welsh actor and singer
- Edward D. Townsend (1817–1893), Adjutant General of the United States Army
- Edward W. Townsend (1855–1942), U.S. Representative from New Jersey
- Edward Loveden Loveden (Edward Loveden Townsend, c. 1751–1822), UK member of parliament
- Ed Townsend (1929–2003), singer/songwriter
- Ed Townsend (swimmer), competitive swimmer
