= The Surrender of Calais =

1791 play

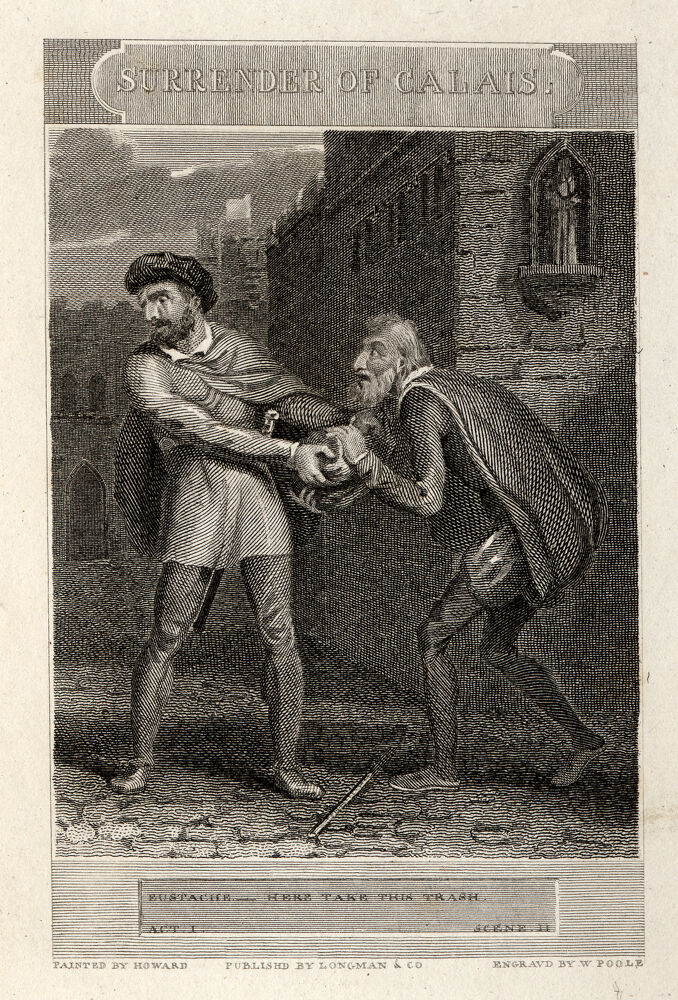
- Original language: English
- Written by: George Colman the Younger
- Genre: Historical
- Setting: Calais, 1347

Premiere
- Date: 30 July 1791
- Place: Theatre Royal, Haymarket, London

The Surrender of Calais is a 1791 historical play by the British playwright George Colman the Younger with elements of tragedy and comedy. It premiered at the Theatre Royal, Haymarket in London on 30 July 1791. The original cast included James Brown Williamson as King Edward, George Bland as Harcourt, Howard Usher as Sir William Manny, John Bannister as La Gloire, John Powell as Arundel, James Aickin as John de Vienne, William Farren as Ribaumont, Robert Bensley as St. Pierre, John Henry Johnstone as O'Carroll, Henry Erskine Johnston as Old Man, Elizabeth Kemble as Julia, Maria Bland as Madelon and Charlotte Goodall as the Queen. It is set against the backdrop of the Siege of Calais (1346–47) by Edward III during the Hundred Years War.

The music was composed by Samuel Arnold. It was the most popular work of the season at the Haymarket. It premiered in Ireland at Dublin's Crow Street Theatre on 23 November 1791. It was revived at various theatres on a number of occasions.

== Bibliography ==
- Greene, John C. Theatre in Dublin, 1745-1820: A Calendar of Performances, Volume 6. Lexington Books, 2011.
- Kozar, Richard & Burling, William J. Summer Theatre in London, 1661-1820, and the Rise of the Haymarket Theatre. Fairleigh Dickinson Univ Press, 2000.
- Nicoll, Allardyce. A History of English Drama 1660–1900: Volume III. Cambridge University Press, 2009.
- Rice, Paul F. British Music and the French Revolution. Cambridge Scholars Publishing, 2010.
