= Wives as They Were and Maids as They Are =

1797 play

- Original language: English
- Written by: Elizabeth Inchbald
- Genre: Comedy
- Setting: London, present day

Premiere
- Date: 4 March 1797
- Place: Theatre Royal, Covent Garden, London

Wives as They Were and Maids as They Are is a 1797 comedy play by the British writer Elizabeth Inchbald. It premiered at the Theatre Royal, Covent Garden in London on 4 March 1797. The original London cast included John Quick as Lord Priory, Joseph Shepherd Munden as Sir William Dorrillon, Alexander Pope as Sir George Evelyn, William Thomas Lewis as Mr Bronzeley, John Waddy as Mr Norberry, John Fawcett as Oliver, James Thompson as Nabson, Charlotte Chapman as Lady Priory, Tryphosa Jane Wallis as Miss Dorrillon and Isabella Mattocks as Lady Mary Raffle. The Irish premiere was at the Crow Street Theatre in Dublin on 12 June 1797.

== Bibliography ==
- Greene, John C. Theatre in Dublin, 1745-1820: A Calendar of Performances, Volume 6. Lexington Books, 2011.
- Nicoll, Allardyce. A History of English Drama 1660–1900: Volume III. Cambridge University Press, 2009.
- Hogan, C.B (ed.) The London Stage, 1660–1800: Volume V. Southern Illinois University Press, 1968.
- Robertson, Ben P. Elizabeth Inchbald's Reputation: A Publishing and Reception History. Routledge, 2015.
- Watson, George. The New Cambridge Bibliography of English Literature: Volume 2, 1660–1800. Cambridge University Press, 1971.
