= The Blind Bargain =

1804 play

Blind Bargain
- Original language: English
- Written by: Frederick Reynolds
- Genre: Comedy
- Setting: England, present day

Premiere
- Date: 24 October 1804
- Place: Theatre Royal, Covent Garden, London

The Blind Bargain is an 1804 comedy play by the British writer Frederick Reynolds. It premiered at the Theatre Royal, Covent Garden in London on 24 October 1804. The original cast included John Fawcett as Sir Andrew Analyse, Charles Farley as Jack Analyse, William Thomas Lewis as Tourly, Charles Kemble as Villars, William Blanchard as Doctor Pliable, John Emery as Giles Woodbine, Maria Gibbs as Mrs Villars and Mary Ann Davenport as Miss Gurnet. Its Irish premiere was at the Crow Street Theatre in Dublin on 1 December 1804.

== Bibliography ==
- Greene, John C. Theatre in Dublin, 1745-1820: A Calendar of Performances, Volume 6. Lexington Books, 2011.
- Nicoll, Allardyce. A History of English Drama 1660–1900: Volume IV. Cambridge University Press, 2009.
