= The Will for the Deed =

1804 play

- Original language: English
- Written by: Thomas John Dibdin
- Genre: Comedy
- Setting: England, present day

Premiere
- Date: 24 March 1804
- Place: Theatre Royal, Covent Garden, London

The Will for the Deed is an 1804 comedy play by the British writer Thomas Dibdin. It premiered at the Theatre Royal, Covent Garden in London on 24 March 1804. The original cast included Joseph Shepherd Munden as Old Harebrain, William Thomas Lewis as Harry Harebreain, William Blanchard as Antimony, Samuel Simmons as Capias, John Fawcett as Motto, Charles Farley as Reference, John Emery as Acorn, William Chapman as Manly and Mary Ann Davenport as Mrs. Reference.

== Bibliography ==
- Greene, John C. Theatre in Dublin, 1745-1820: A Calendar of Performances, Volume 6. Lexington Books, 2011.
- Nicoll, Allardyce. A History of English Drama 1660–1900: Volume IV. Cambridge University Press, 2009.
