= The Delinquent =

1805 play

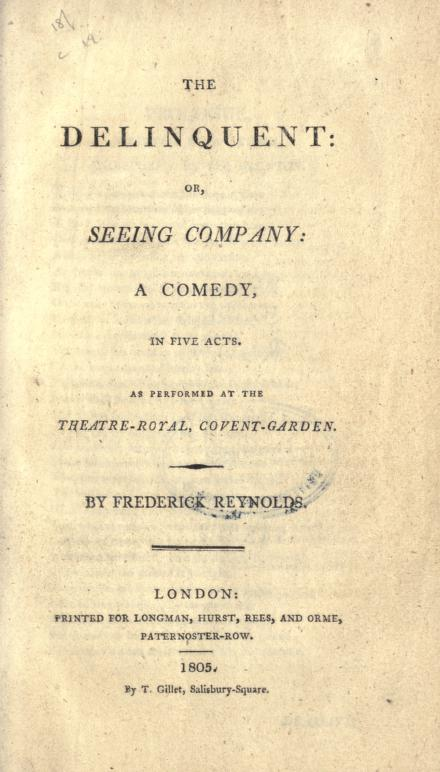
- Original language: English
- Written by: Frederick Reynolds
- Genre: Comedy
- Setting: England, present day

Premiere
- Date: 14 November 1805
- Place: Theatre Royal, Covent Garden, London

The Delinquent is an 1805 comedy play by the British writer Frederick Reynolds. It premiered at the Theatre Royal, Drury Lane in London on 14 November 1805. The original cast included John Philip Kemble as The Delinquent, John Brunton as Sir Edward Specious, Joseph Shepherd Munden as Major Tornado, John Fawcett as Old Doric, William Thomas Lewis as Young Doric, William Claremont as Dorville, John Waddy as Landlord, John Liston as Old Nicholas, John Emery as Tom Tackle, George Davies Harley as Waiter, Nannette Johnston as Olivia and Maria Gibbs as Mrs. Aubrey.

== Bibliography ==
- Greene, John C. Theatre in Dublin, 1745-1820: A Calendar of Performances, Volume 6. Lexington Books, 2011.
- Nicoll, Allardyce. A History of English Drama 1660–1900: Volume IV. Cambridge University Press, 2009.
