= Errors Excepted =

1807 play

- Original language: English
- Written by: Thomas John Dibdin
- Genre: Comedy
- Setting: England, present day

Premiere
- Date: 13 August 1807
- Place: Theatre Royal, Haymarket, London

Errors Excepted is an 1807 comedy play by the British writer Thomas Dibdin. It premiered at the Theatre Royal, Haymarket in London on 13 August 1807. The original cast included Charles Mayne Young as Frank Woodland, John Fawcett as Commodore Convoy, Charles Mathews as Lawyer Verdict, John Waddy as Mr Grumley, William Chapman as Old Mannerly, Vincent De Camp as Young Mannerly, Mr. Carles as Gabriel Invioice, John Liston as Richard, Harriett Litchfield as Sylvia, Jane Powell as Betty Barnes, Sarah Liston as Mrs Hall and Maria Gibbs as Fanny Freeman.

== Bibliography ==
- Greene, John C. Theatre in Dublin, 1745-1820: A Calendar of Performances, Volume 6. Lexington Books, 2011.
- Nicoll, Allardyce. A History of English Drama 1660–1900: Volume IV. Cambridge University Press, 2009.
