= Edward Townsend (actor) =

Welsh actor

Edward Evans Townsend (1766–1809) was a Welsh stage actor and singer. After making his reputation as a touring actor in Yorkshire, notably at Hull under the management of Tate Wilkinson, he was at the Theatre Royal, Norwich in the early 1790s. He also appeared in Ireland at the Crow Street Theatre and the Theatre Royal, Cork.

On 14 November 1793 Townsend took the title role in the opera Robin Hood at the Theatre Royal, Covent Garden in London's West End. He remained part of the Covent Garden company until 1802, appearing particularly in comic operas and pantomimes. He took over the Horns Tavern near Kennington Common in 1803, and continued to perform at Sadler's Wells and other London venues as a singer. He died at the Horns Tavern on 22 March 1809 and was buried at St Mary, Lambeth. His wife Elizabeth Townsend was an actress, who appeared at Covent Garden in the 1790s.

== Selected roles ==
- Major Drummond in Arrived in Portsmouth by William Pearce (1794)
- Robin in Life's Vagaries by John O'Keeffe (1795)
- Tim in The Bank Note by William Macready the Elder (1795)
- Devereux in The Wicklow Mountains by John O'Keeffe (1795)
- Jack Junk in The Mouth of the Nile by Thomas John Dibdin (1798)
- Costly in Laugh When You Can by Frederick Reynolds (1798)

== Bibliography ==
- Greene, John C. Theatre in Dublin, 1745–1820: A Calendar of Performances. Lehigh University Press, 2011.
- Highfill, Philip H, Burnim, Kalman A. & Langhans, Edward A. A Biographical Dictionary of Actors, Actresses, Musicians, Dancers, Managers & Other Stage Personnel in London, 1660–1800, Volume 15. SIU Press, 1993.
