= Begone Dull Care (play) =

1808 play

- Original language: English
- Written by: Frederick Reynolds
- Genre: Comedy
- Setting: London, present day

Premiere
- Date: 9 February 1808
- Place: Theatre Royal, Covent Garden, London

Begone Dull Care is an 1808 comedy play by the English writer Frederick Reynolds. It premiered at the Theatre Royal, Covent Garden in London on 9 February 1808. The original Covent Garden cast included Alexander Pope as Sir Arthur St Albyn, Charles Kemble as Algernon St Albyn, William Thomas Lewis as Modern, John Brunton as Danvers, John Fawcett as Lord Blushdale, John Emery as Solace, William Chapman as Trusty, Samuel Simmons as Geoffrey, Sarah Smith as Selina, Mary Ann Davenport as Deborah. The Irish premiere took place at the Crow Street Theatre in Dublin on 30 March 1808.

== Bibliography ==
- Greene, John C. Theatre in Dublin, 1745-1820: A Calendar of Performances, Volume 6. Lexington Books, 2011.
- Nicoll, Allardyce. A History of English Drama 1660–1900: Volume IV. Cambridge University Press, 2009.
