= Guilty or Not Guilty (play) =

1804 play

- Original language: English
- Written by: Thomas John Dibdin
- Genre: Comedy
- Setting: England, present day

Premiere
- Date: 26 May 1804
- Place: Theatre Royal, Haymarket, London

Guilty or Not Guilty is an 1804 comedy play by the British author Thomas Dibdin. It premiered at the Theatre Royal, Haymarket in London on 26 May 1804. The original cast included Robert Palmer as Major Corslet, William Chapman as Mr. Balance, Robert William Elliston as Edmond Rigid, Vincent De Camp as Sir Harry Pointer, Charles Mathews as Triangle and Maria Gibbs as Nancy.

== Bibliography ==
- Greene, John C. Theatre in Dublin, 1745-1820: A Calendar of Performances, Volume 6. Lexington Books, 2011.
- Nicoll, Allardyce. A History of English Drama 1660–1900: Volume IV. Cambridge University Press, 2009.
