= The Voice of Nature =

1803 play

- Original language: English
- Written by: James Boaden
- Genre: Historical
- Setting: Sicily

Premiere
- Date: 31 July 1802
- Place: Theatre Royal, Haymarket, London

The Voice of Nature is an 1802 historical play by the British writer James Boaden. It premiered at the Theatre Royal, Haymarket in London on 31 July 1802. It was inspired by the melodrama Le Jugement de Salomon by the French playwright Louis-Charles Caigniez. The Irish premiere took place at the Crow Street Theatre in Dublin on 21 January 1806. The original Haymarket cast included William Barrymore as Alphonso, King of Sicily, Charles Kemble as Rinaldo, John Waddy as Gareb, Robert Palmer as Riccardo, Catherine St Ledger as Alzira, Maria Gibbs as Lilla and Mary Ann Davenport as Bendetta.

== Bibliography ==
- Greene, John C. Theatre in Dublin, 1745-1820: A Calendar of Performances, Volume 6. Lexington Books, 2011.
- Jenkins, Annibel. I'll Tell You What: The Life of Elizabeth Inchbald. University Press of Kentucky, 2021.
- Nicoll, Allardyce. A History of English Drama 1660–1900: Volume III. Cambridge University Press, 2009.
