= The Irishman in London =

1792 play

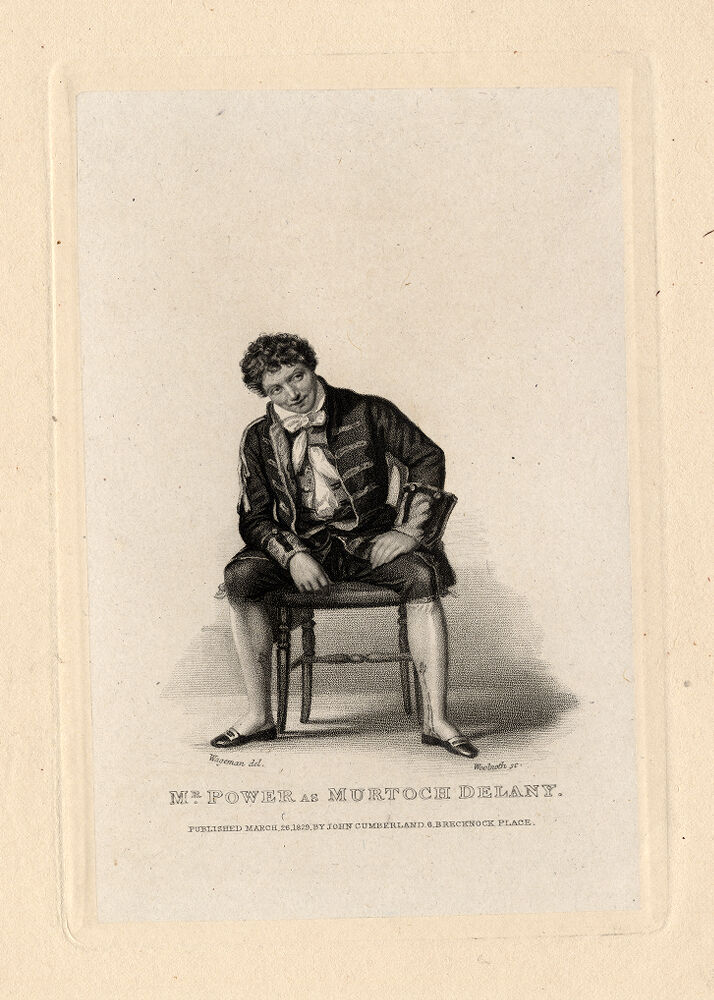
- Tyrone Power as Murtoch Delany, 1829
- Original language: English
- Written by: William Macready the Elder
- Genre: Comedy
- Setting: London, present day

Premiere
- Date: 21 April 1792
- Place: Theatre Royal, Covent Garden, London

The Irishman in London is a 1792 comedy play by the Irish writer and actor William Macready the Elder. A farce, it premiered as an afterpiece at the Theatre Royal, Covent Garden in London on the 21 April 1792. The original cast included George Davies Harley as Captain Seymour, Macready as Colloony, Joseph Shepherd Munden as Frost, John Henry Johnstone as Murtoch Delany, John Fawcett as Edward, Thomas Blanchard as Cymon, Isabella Mattocks as Louisa and Charlotte Chapman as Caroline. The Irish premiere took place at the Crow Street Theatre in Dublin on 19 July 1792.

== Bibliography ==
- Greene, John C. Theatre in Dublin, 1745-1820: A Calendar of Performances, Volume 6. Lexington Books, 2011.
- Nicoll, Allardyce. A History of English Drama 1660–1900: Volume III. Cambridge University Press, 2009.
- Hogan, C.B (ed.) The London Stage, 1660–1800: Volume V. Southern Illinois University Press, 1968.
