= Zorinski =

1795 play

- Original language: English
- Written by: Thomas Morton
- Genre: Tragedy
- Setting: Krakov, Kingdom of Poland

Premiere
- Date: 20 June 1795
- Place: Theatre Royal, Haymarket, London

Zorinski, also known as Casimir, King of Poland, is a 1795 historical tragedy in three acts by the British playwright Thomas Morton. It enjoyed considerable success.

The play's plot was "founded on the adventures of Stanislaus."

Shortly after the play's 1795 premiere, an anonymous pamphlet titled Mr. Morton's "Zorinski" and Brooke's "Gustavus Vasa" Compared alleged that Morton's play was essentially plagiarized from Henry Brooke's 1738 Gustavus Vasa — Morton's characters Rodomosko, Rosolia, and Zorinski were respectively Brooke's Cristiern, Cristina, and Gustavus; Morton's salt-mines were Brooke's copper-mines, and so on.

== Performances ==
Zorinski first appeared at the Theatre Royal, Haymarket, in London, on 20 June 1795. The cast included William Barrymore as Zorinski, James Aickin as Casimir, King of Poland, Robert Bensley as Rodomsko, Charles Kemble as Radanzo, John Bannister as Zarno, John Henry Johnstone as O'Curragh, Richard Suett as Amalekite, John Fawcett as Witski, Thomas Caulfield as Naclo, Elizabeth Kemble as Rosolia and Maria Bland as Winifred. It included music composed by Samuel Arnold.

The Irish premiere was at the Crow Street Theatre in Dublin on 28 November 1795.

== Bibliography ==
- Kozar, Richard & Burling, William J. Summer Theatre in London, 1661-1820, and the Rise of the Haymarket Theatre. Fairleigh Dickinson Univ Press, 2000.
- Hogan, C.B (ed.) The London Stage, 1660–1800: Volume V. Southern Illinois University Press, 1968.
