= The Battle of Hexham =

1789 play

- 1790 playtext published in Ireland
- Original language: English
- Written by: George Colman the Younger
- Genre: History

Premiere
- Date: 11 August 1789
- Place: Haymarket Theatre, London

The Battle of Hexham is a 1789 history play by the British writer George Colman the Younger. It is based around the 1464 Battle of Hexham, a decisive Yorkist victory during the War of the Roses. It revived Colman's career after the disappointment of his works following his earlier hit Inkle and Yarico. It premiered at the Haymarket Theatre in London on 11 August 1789 with a cast that included John Edwin and Maria Theresa Kemble. It helped reinvigorate the history genre. It combined a mixture of comedy, pathos and mystery and owned a great deal of its inspiration to Shakespeare's histories.

== Bibliography ==
- Sutcliffe, Barry. Plays by George Colman the Younger and Thomas Morton. CUP Archive, 1983.
- Taylor, George. The French Revolution and the London Stage, 1789-1805 Cambridge University Press, 2000.
- Watson, George. The New Cambridge Bibliography of English Literature: Volume 2, 1660–1800. Cambridge University Press, 1971.
