= Education (play) =

1813 play

- Original language: English
- Written by: Thomas Morton
- Genre: Comedy
- Setting: England, Present day

Premiere
- Date: 27 April 1813
- Place: Theatre Royal, Covent Garden, London

Education is an 1813 comedy play by the British writer Thomas Morton. It premiered at the Theatre Royal, Covent Garden in London on 27 April 1813. The original cast included Charles Mayne Young as Count Villars, Charles Mathews as Sir Guy Stanch, John Fawcett as Mr. Templeton, Charles Kemble as Vincent Templeton, John Liston as Suckling, William Barrymore as Damper, John Emery as Broadcast, Mary Catherine Bolton as Rosine, Maria Theresa Kemble as Mrs Templeton, Sarah Booth as Ellen and Mary Ann Davenport as Dame Broadcast.

== Bibliography ==
- Greene, John C. Theatre in Dublin, 1745-1820: A Calendar of Performances, Volume 6. Lexington Books, 2011.
- Nicoll, Allardyce. A History of Early Nineteenth Century Drama 1800-1850. Cambridge University Press, 1930.
- Valladares, Susan. Staging the Peninsular War: English Theatres 1807-1815. Routledge, 2016.
