= False Impressions =

1797 play

- Written by: Richard Cumberland
- Original language: English
- Genre: Melodrama

Premiere
- Date premiered: 23 November 1797
- Place premiered: Covent Garden Theatre

False Impressions is a 1797 melodramatic comedy play by the British playwright Richard Cumberland. It was first staged at the Covent Garden Theatre in November 1797. Much of the plot resembles Cumberland's 1795 novel Henry. Algernon has to pretend to be a servant to restore his good name.

The original cast included John Quick as Scud, Joseph George Holman as Algernon, Joseph Shepherd Munden as Simon Single, Charles Murray as Sir Oliver Monrath, John Whitfield as Earling, James Thompson as Frank, Julia Betterton as Emily Fitzallan, Margaret Knight as Jenny Scud and Mary Ann Davenport as Mrs Buckram.

== Bibliography ==
- Nicoll, Allardyce. A History of English Drama 1660-1900. Volume III: Late Eighteenth Century Drama. Cambridge University Press, 1952.
