= To Marry or Not to Marry =

1805 play

- Original language: English
- Written by: Elizabeth Inchbald
- Genre: Comedy
- Setting: England, present day

Premiere
- Date: 16 February 1805
- Place: Theatre Royal, Covent Garden, London

To Marry or Not to Marry is an 1805 comedy play by the British writer Elizabeth Inchbald. It premiered at the Theatre Royal, Covent Garden in London on 16 February 1805. The original cast included Joseph Shepherd Munden as Lord Danberry, John Philip Kemble as Sir Oswin Mortland, Charles Farley as Willowear, George Frederick Cooke as Lavensforth, Julia Glover as Lady Susan Courtley and Mary Ann Davenport as Sarah Mortland. It was the last of Inchbald's new plays to be staged in her lifetime.

== Bibliography ==
- Greene, John C. Theatre in Dublin, 1745-1820: A Calendar of Performances, Volume 6. Lexington Books, 2011.
- Nicoll, Allardyce. A History of English Drama 1660–1900: Volume III. Cambridge University Press, 2009.
- Hogan, C.B (ed.) The London Stage, 1660–1800: Volume V. Southern Illinois University Press, 1968.
- Robertson, Ben P. Elizabeth Inchbald's Reputation: A Publishing and Reception History. Routledge, 2015.
- Watson, George. The New Cambridge Bibliography of English Literature: Volume 2, 1660–1800. Cambridge University Press, 1971.
