= John Fawcett (actor died 1793) =

John Fawcett (died 1793) was an actor who played at the Theatre Royal in Drury Lane as well as in Dublin and on several occasions at the Theatre Royal in Richmond. He is best known today for having fathered a rather more famous actor of the same name.

== See also ==
- John Fawcett (actor).
