= The Reprisal =

1757 play

- Original language: English
- Written by: Tobias Smollett
- Genre: Farce

Premiere
- Date: January 1757
- Place: Theatre Royal, Drury Lane, London

The Reprisal; or, The Tars of Old England is a 1757 comedy play by the British writer Tobias Smollett. An afterpiece, it was first performed at the Theatre Royal, Drury Lane in London and produced by David Garrick. The cast included Howard Usher as Heartley, John Palmer as Brush, Richard Yates as Oclabber, Henry Woodward as Block, Maria Macklin as Harriet. It marked Smollett's last attempt to write for the stage, as several projects had fallen through and his 1749 tragedy The Regicide remained published but unperformed. It was revived in 1784 at the Haymarket.

== Bibliography ==
- Jones, Richard J. Tobias Smollett in the Enlightenment: Travels through France, Italy, and Scotland. Bucknell University Press, 2011.
- Nicoll, Allardyce. A History of English Drama 1660–1900: Volume III. Cambridge University Press, 2009.
- Hogan, C.B (ed.) The London Stage, 1660–1800: Volume V. Southern Illinois University Press, 1968.
