= The Heir at Law =

1797 play by George Colman the Younger

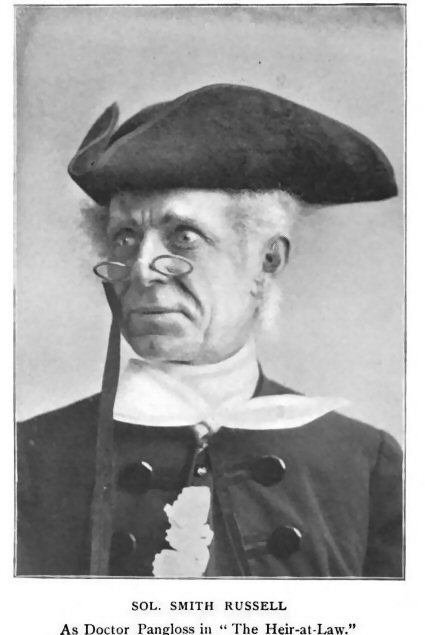
Sol Smith Russell, one of many well-known actors who have played Dr. Pangloss

The Heir at Law (1797) is a comedic play in five acts by the English dramatist George Colman the Younger that remained popular through the 19th century. It and John Bull (1803) were Colman's best known comedies.

The piece debuted at the Haymarket in London on 15 July 1797, with John Fawcett playing Dr. Pangloss, and ran for 27 performances.

It was first performed in the United States at the Park Theatre in New York in April 1799. Many American actors played the role of Pangloss to success, including comedian Joseph Jefferson starting in 1857 at the Olympic Theatre in New York.

== Characters and plot ==
The play is best known for creating the comic character of Dr. Peter Pangloss, a greedy and pompous teacher hired at a salary of 300 pounds a year to tutor merchant Daniel Dowlas, who has been recently elevated to the title of Lord Duberly after the death of a distant cousin. Pangloss refers to himself as an "LL.D. and A.S.S.", and the character is fond of spouting off literary quotes which he then attributes in the fashion of "Lend me your ears. Shakespeare. Hem!" or "Verbum sat. Horace. Hem!" The surname "Pangloss" is derived from the character of that name in the 1759 novel Candide by Voltaire, the personal tutor of the main character Candide.

== July 1797 cast ==
- John Fawcett as Dr. Pangloss
- Richard Suett as Daniel Dowlas, Lord Duberly
- John Palmer as Dick Dowlas
- Joseph Shepherd Munden as Zekiel Homespun
- Charles Kemble as Henry Horeland
- James Aickin as Steadfast
- John Henry Johnstone as Kenrick
- Maria Theresa Kemble (Miss De Camp) as Caroline Dormer
- Maria Gibbs as Cicely Homespun
- Mary Ann Davenport as Deborah Dowlas, Lady Duberly
