= John Boaden =

English painter

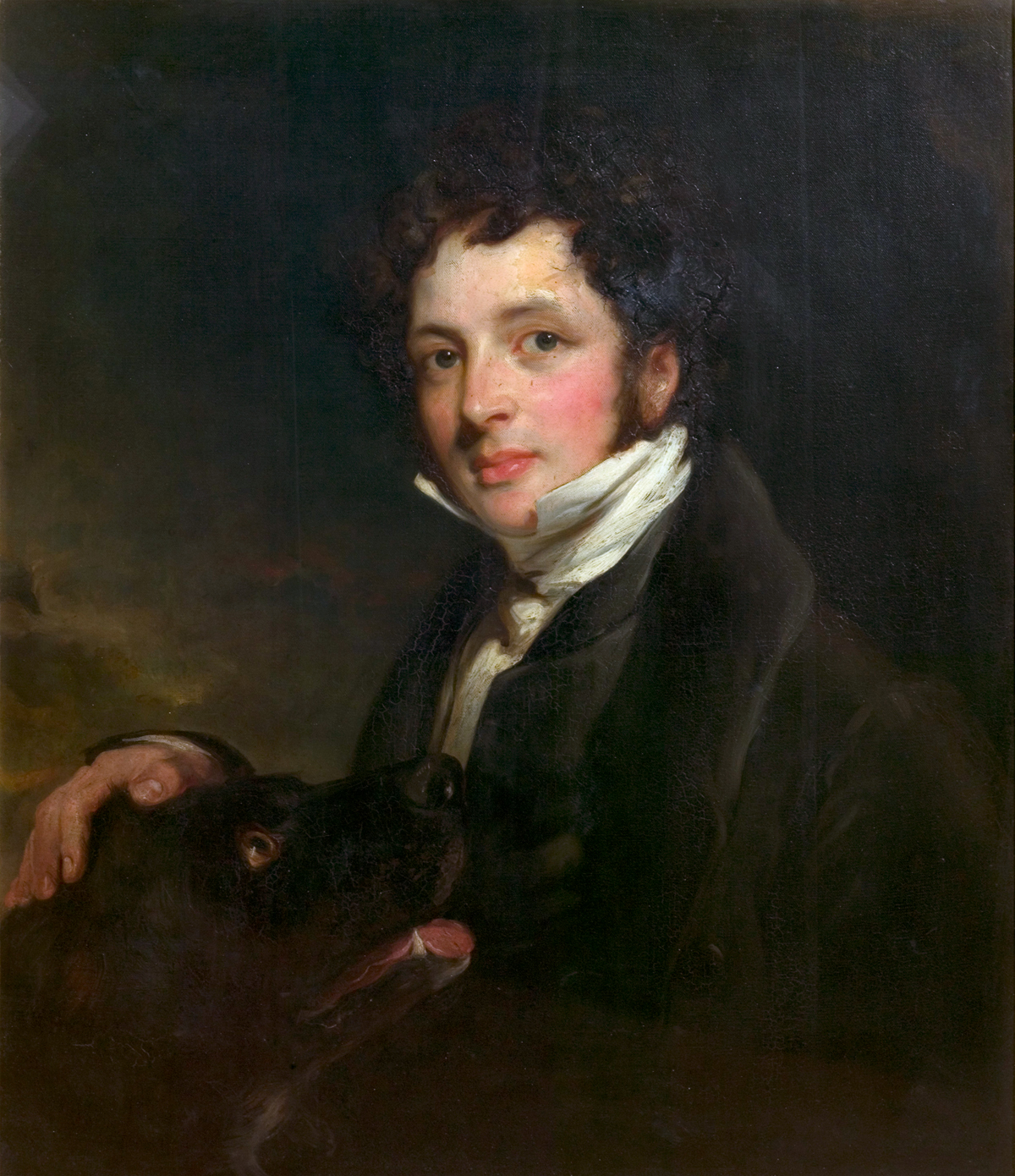
Portrait by Boaden of the Rev. Chauncy Hare Townshend in the Victoria and Albert Museum

John Boaden (1792/93 – 4 April 1839) was an English portrait painter.

== Life ==
Boaden was the son of the theatre critic James Boaden and sister of playwright Caroline Boaden. A painter of portraits and theatrical subjects, he exhibited 40 works at the Royal Academy between 1810 and 1833, 90 at the British Institute between 1810 and 1839, and 59 at the Society of British Artists between 1827 and 1840 (in the last year posthumously).

Just six weeks after his father's death, Boaden died of "apoplexy" in London, aged 46.
