= John Bull (play) =

1803 play

- Original language: English
- Written by: George Colman the Younger
- Genre: Comedy
- Setting: Cornwall, present day

Premiere
- Date: 5 March 1803
- Place: Theatre Royal, Covent Garden, London

John Bull is an 1803 comedy play by the British writer George Colman the Younger. It premiered at the Theatre Royal, Covent Garden on 5 March 1803. The original cast included George Frederick Cooke as Peregrine, Henry Erskine Johnston as Frank Rochdale, Charles Klanert as Williams, John Waddy as Lord Fitz-Balaam, William Thomas Lewis as Honourable Tom Shuffleton, John Henry Johnstone as Dennis Brulgruddery, John Fawcett as Job Thornberry, George Davenport as Mr Pennyman, John Emery as Dan, Nannette Johnston as Lady Caroline Braymore, Mary Ann Davenport as Mrs Bulgruddery and Maria Gibbs as Mary Thornberry. The prologue was written by Thomas Dibdin. Its Irish premiere was at Dublin's Crow Street Theatre on 18 May 1803.

== Bibliography ==
- Greene, John C. Theatre in Dublin, 1745-1820: A Calendar of Performances, Volume 6. Lexington Books, 2011.
- Nicoll, Allardyce. A History of Early Nineteenth Century Drama 1800-1850. Cambridge University Press, 1930.
