= The Mouth of the Nile =

1798 musical

- Original language: English
- Written by: Thomas John Dibdin
- Genre: Musical entertainment
- Setting: Aboukir Bay, 1798

Premiere
- Date: 25 October 1798
- Place: Theatre Royal, Covent Garden, London

The Mouth of the Nile; Or, The Glorious First of August is a 1798 patriotic musical written by the British author Thomas John Dibdin with music composed by Thomas Attwood. It celebrated the recent naval victory of Horatio Nelson over the French at the Battle of the Nile. It premiered at the Theatre Royal, Covent Garden on 25 October 1798 as an afterpiece. The original cast included Edward Townsend as Jack Junk, John Fawcett as William, Dibdin as Pat, Charles Incledon as Michael and Sarah Sims as Susan. The prologue was written by Richard Cumberland. The Irish premiere took place at the Crow Street Theatre in Dublin on 18 December 1799.

== Bibliography ==
- Greene, John C. Theatre in Dublin, 1745-1820: A Calendar of Performances, Volume 6. Lexington Books, 2011.
- Nicoll, Allardyce. A History of English Drama 1660–1900: Volume III. Cambridge University Press, 2009.
- Hogan, C.B (ed.) The London Stage, 1660–1800: Volume V. Southern Illinois University Press, 1968.
- Roy, David. Romantic and Revolutionary Theatre, 1789-1860. Cambridge University Press, 2003.
