= A Cure for the Heart Ache =

1797 comedy play by Thomas Morton

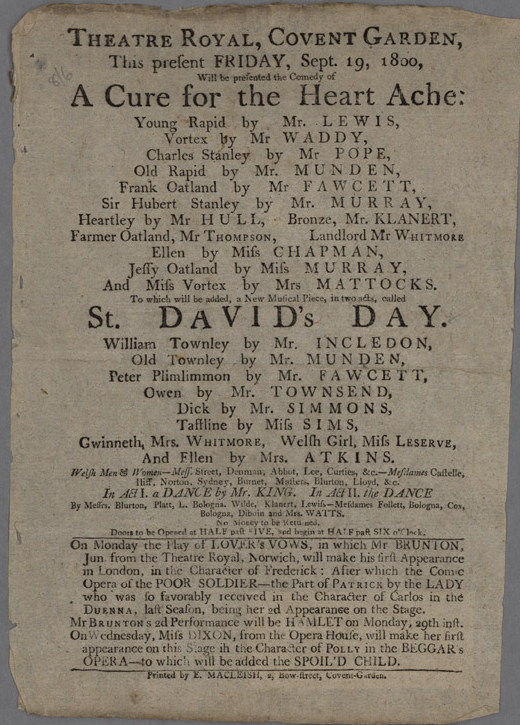
- Written by: Thomas Morton
- Original language: English
- Genre: Comedy

Premiere
- Date premiered: 10 January 1797
- Place premiered: Covent Garden Theatre, London

A Cure for the Heart Ache is a 1797 comedy play by the British writer Thomas Morton.

It premiered at the Covent Garden Theatre in London. The original cast included William Thomas Lewis as Young Rapid, John Quick as Vortex, Alexander Pope as Charles Stanley, Joseph Shepherd Munden as Old Rapid, John Fawcett as Frank Oatland, Charles Murray as Sir Hubert Stanley, Thomas Hull as Heartley, Charles Farley as Bronze, James Thompson as Landlord, Isabella Mattocks as Miss Vortex, Jane Pope as Ellen.

== Bibliography ==
- Nicoll, Allardyce. A History of English Drama 1660–1900: Volume III. Cambridge University Press, 2009.
- Hogan, C.B (ed.) The London Stage, 1660–1800: Volume V. Southern Illinois University Press, 1968.
