= John Fawcett (actor) =

English actor and playwright (1768–1837)

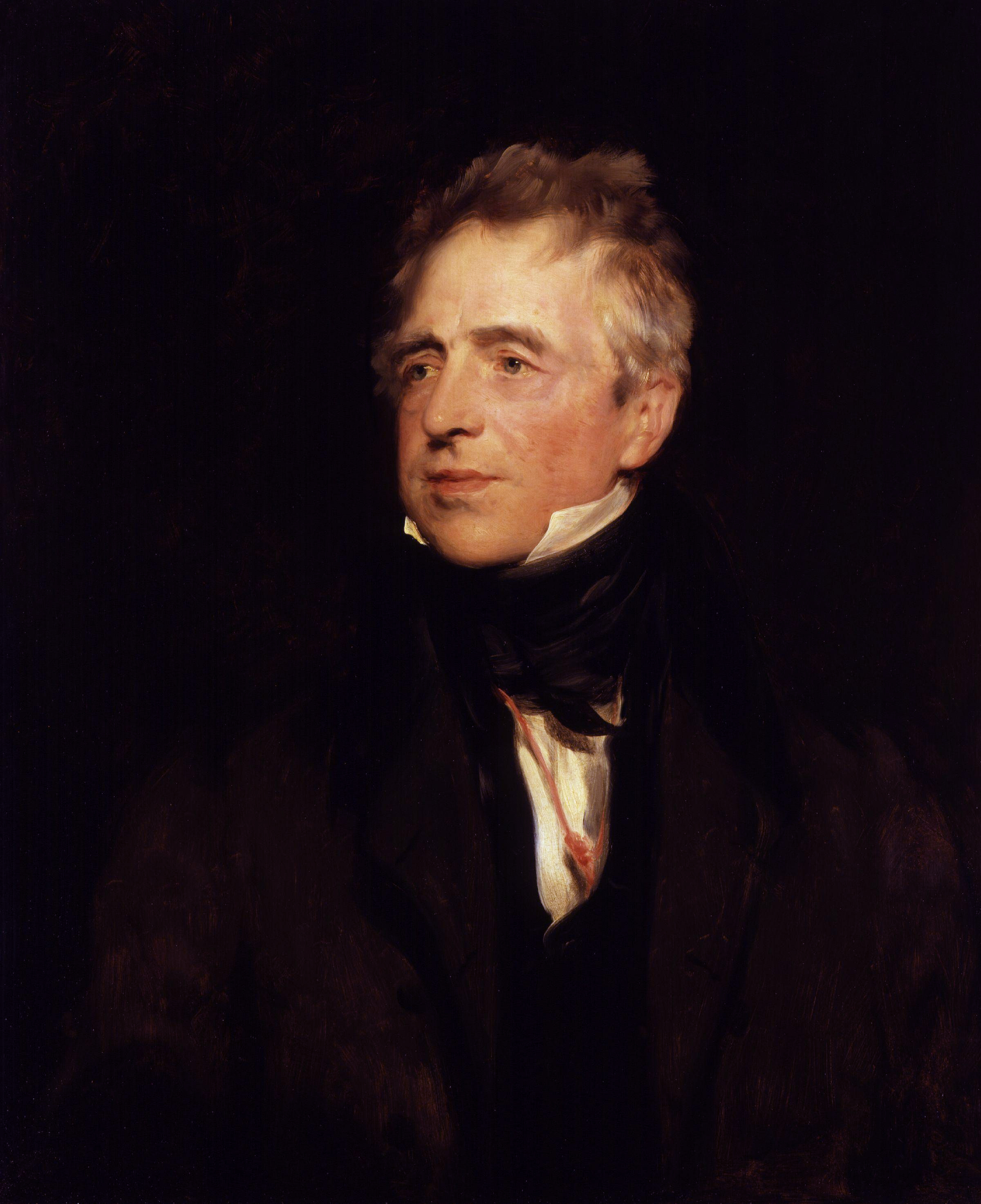
- Portrait by Thomas Lawrence, 1828
- Born: 29 August 1768; London, England
- Died: 13 March 1837 (aged 68); Botley, Hampshire, England
- Occupations: Actor, Playwright

John Fawcett (29 August 1768 – 13 March 1837) was an English actor and playwright.

== Career ==
John Fawcett was the son of York, Dublin and London actor John Fawcett (d. 1793) and his wife Sarah Plaw. His interest in following his father's career were thwarted by the latter, who sent him to St Paul's School in 1776, then placed him in a London apprenticeship with a linen draper, but young John ran away at the age of eighteen and joined Charles Mates' theatrical company at Margate. Appearing under the name of Foote, he debuted as Courtall in The Belle's Stratagem. He then went to Tunbridge Wells, billed under his own name, and was recommended to Tate Wilkinson, whose York company Fawcett then joined, first appearing 24 May 1787. Though viewed as having promise, he proved a minor disappointment in dramatic roles but found success in comedic parts. On 5 May 1788, he married actress Susan Moore, who had previously been in a long-term relationship with recently deceased fellow company member, John Mills, by whom she had several children including actress Rosamund Charles Mills, later wife of violinist John David Loder.

In 1791, he left the York circuit for Covent Garden, first appearing as Caleb in He Wou'd Be a Soldier in September, becoming a London mainstay, also appearing at Haymarket from 1794. There, manager George Colman wrote roles specifically for him, and named him stage manager in 1799 before a dispute caused his departure in 1802, but he returned again six years later. He also had disputes with Covent Garden manager Thomas Harris. During off-seasons he also appeared with provincial theatres, including at Ashburne, Edinburgh, Liverpool and Richmond.

His wife Susan died in 1797, and though a rumoured engagement in 1799 to actress Biggs came to nought, he married in 1806 to another actress, Anne Gaudry, daughter of actor Joseph Gaudry. He served as stage manager at Covent Garden from about 1818 but after the 1828 season was removed, and shortly thereafter announced his intention to leave the stage, which he did in 1830. He retired to Botley, Hampshire, where he spearheaded a campaign to build a new church, in which he would be the first buried following his death, 13 March 1837, his will leaving his property to his widow Anne and son. He had several children by Anne Gaudry, including Rev. John Turner Colman Fawcett (1804-1867), and Robert Henry Harris Fawcett (1805-1859) of the 18th Regiment and the Bengal Civil Service. Fawcett's library was sold at auction in London by Fletcher on 21 January 1845 (and four following days), alongside the library of Arundel Wright (editor of the Morning Post) and that of a deceased barrister. A copy of the catalogue is held at Cambridge University Library (shelfmark Munby.c.157(16)).

As his career progressed Fawcett became effective in playing a range of characters, being particularly remembered as Dr. Pangloss in The Heir at Law (1797) and Dr. Ollapod in The Poor Gentleman (1801). He also authored several pantomimes.

== Selected roles ==
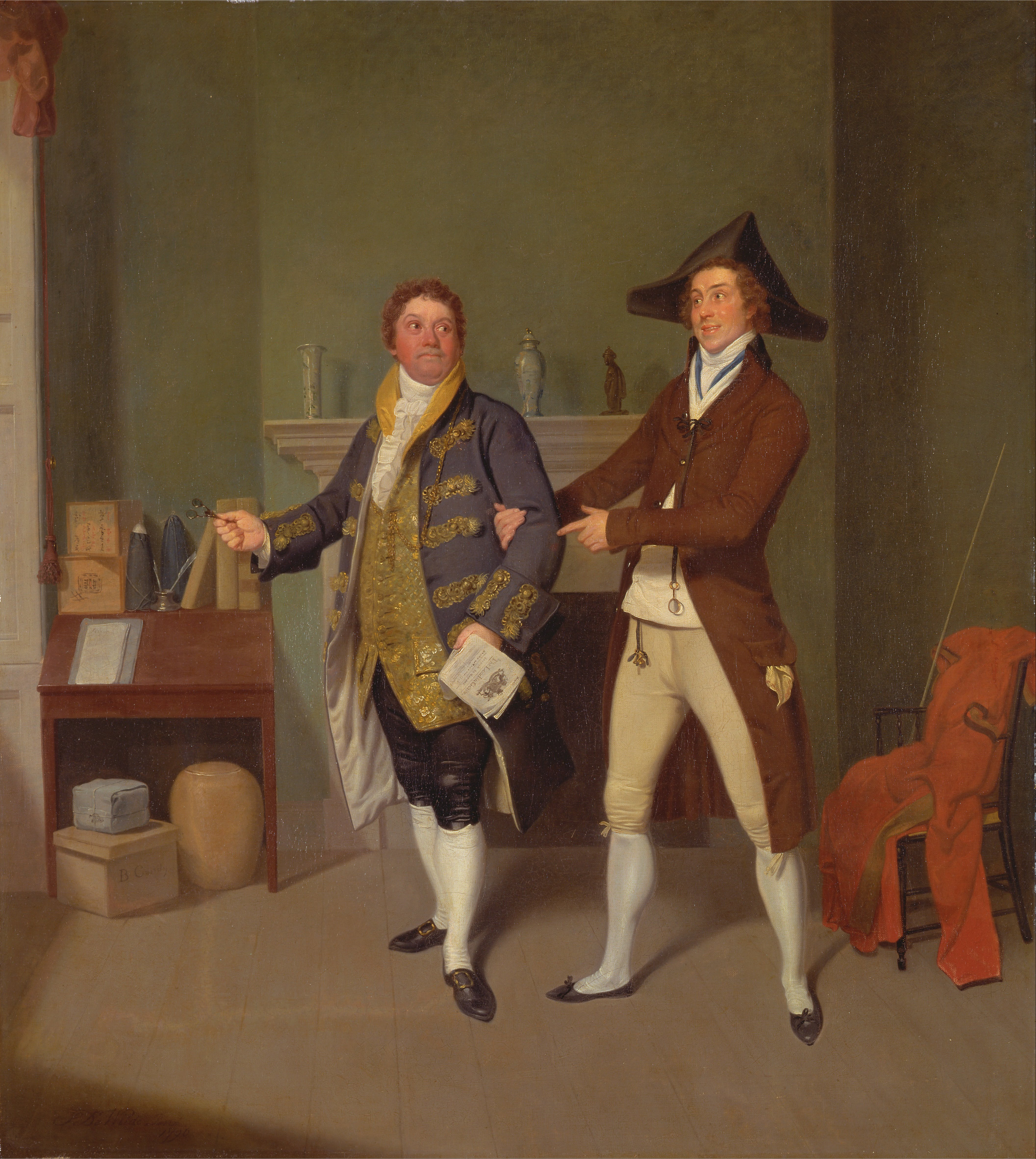
Fawcett (right) with John Quick in The Way to Get Married.

- A La Greque in A Day in Turkey by Hannah Cowley (1791)
- Edward in The Irishman in London by William Macready the Elder (1792)
- Master Jack in The World in a Village by John O'Keeffe (1793)
- Mr Placid in Everyone Has His Fault by Elizabeth Inchbald (1793)
- Latitat in How to Grow Rich by Frederick Reynolds (1793)
- Mr Savage in The Rage by Frederick Reynolds (1794)
- Fancourt in The Town Before You by Hannah Cowley (1794)
- George Burgess in Life's Vagaries by John O'Keeffe (1795)
- Witski in Zorinski by Thomas Morton (1795)
- Jack Arable in Speculation by Frederick Reynolds (1795)
- Ned Dash in The Bank Note by William Macready the Elder (1795)
- Dick Dashall in The Way to Get Married by Thomas Morton (1796)
- Tom Seymour in Fortune's Fool by Frederick Reynolds (1796)
- Doctor Pangloss in The Heir at Law by George Colman the Younger (1797)
- Oliver in Wives as They Were and Maids as They Are by Elizabeth Inchbald (1797)
- Frank Oatland in A Cure for the Heart Ache by Thomas Morton (1797)
- April in Secrets Worth Knowing by Thomas Morton (1798)
- Doctor Crisis in The Eccentric Lover by Richard Cumberland (1798)
- William in The Mouth of the Nile by Thomas John Dibdin (1798)
- Sambo in Laugh When You Can by Frederick Reynolds (1798)
- Sharpset in The Votary of Wealth by Joseph George Holman (1799)
- Mist in Management by Frederick Reynolds (1799)
- Jack Junk in The Birth Day by Thomas John Dibdin (1799)
- Lackbrain in Life by Frederick Reynolds (1800)
- Doctor Ollapod in The Poor Gentleman by George Colman the Younger (1801)
- Ephraim The School for Prejudice by Thomas Dibdin (1801)
- Paul Postpone in Delays and Blunders by Frederick Reynolds (1802)
- Job Thornberry in John Bull by George Colman the Younger (1803)
- George McTack in The Three Per Cents by Frederick Reynolds (1803)
- Sir Andrew Analyse in The Blind Bargain by Frederick Reynolds (1804)
- Motto The Will for the Deed by Thomas Dibdin (1804)
- Old Doric in The Delinquent by Frederick Reynolds (1805)
- Solomon Gundy in Who Wants a Guinea? by George Colman the Younger (1805)
- Kalendar in Five Miles Off by Thomas Dibdin (1806)
- Fairford in A Hint to Husbands by Richard Cumberland (1806)
- Commodore Convoy in Errors Excepted by Thomas Dibdin (1807)
- Cosey in Town and Country by Thomas Morton (1807)
- Lord Blushdale in Begone Dull Care by Frederick Reynolds (1808)
- Doctor Suitall in The Gazette Extraordinary by Joseph George Holman (1811)
- Templeton in Education by Thomas Morton (1813)
- Captain Copp in Charles the Second by John Howard Payne (1824)
