= Maria Ann Campion =

Irish actress (1777-1803)

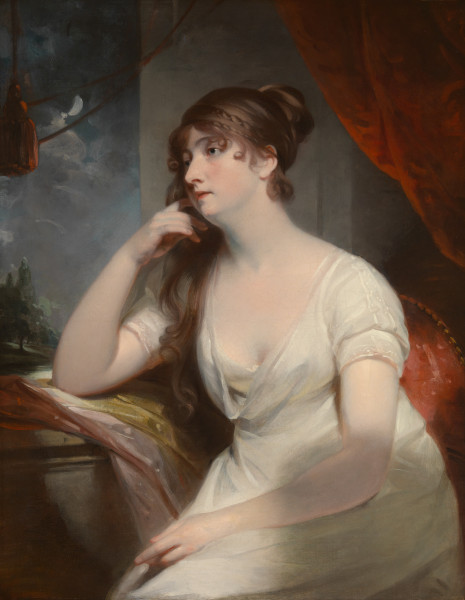
- Portrait by Sir Martin Archer Shee, 1800
- Born: 1775; Waterford
- Died: 18 June 1803 (aged 27–28); Piccadilly

Maria Ann Campion (1777 - 18 June 1803) was a popular Irish actress and the second wife of the actor Alexander Pope. She was born in Waterford, Ireland and died in London on 18 June 1803, and was buried in Westminster Abbey.

== Life ==
When she was in her teens, her father died and she resolved to go on the stage to support her mother and sister. She made her first appearance in Dublin, as Monimia, in The Orphan, 17 February 1790, but experienced such severe stage fright that she was unable to go on. The director pushed her on stage and she completed the performance. After she became the darling of the Dublin stage she was engaged at Covent Garden.

She first appeared in London, in the same character, at Covent-Garden Theatre, on 13 October 1797, and married an actor named Alexander Pope on 24 January 1798. She returned to Dublin where she appeared at the Fish Shamble Street Theatre. She then when to York and for some reason assumed the name of Mrs. Spencer. In June 1799, she gave birth to a baby boy, but the child died soon after. In June 1801, Campion and her husband were discharged from Covent Garden but appeared at Drury Lane in January 1802.

On 10 June 1803, she became ill on-stage while playing Desdemona and the performance was completed by another actress. On 18 June, she collapsed and died at the age of twenty-six. She was survived by a daughter. Her mother had died the previous year. She was interred in Westminster Abbey on 25 June alongside Pope's first wife Elizabeth Younge.

She is stated to have been the author of two novels.
