= Henry Erskine Johnston =

Scottish actor (1777–1830)

Henry Erskine Johnston (1777–1838?) was a Scottish actor given the sobriquet The Edinburgh Roscius.

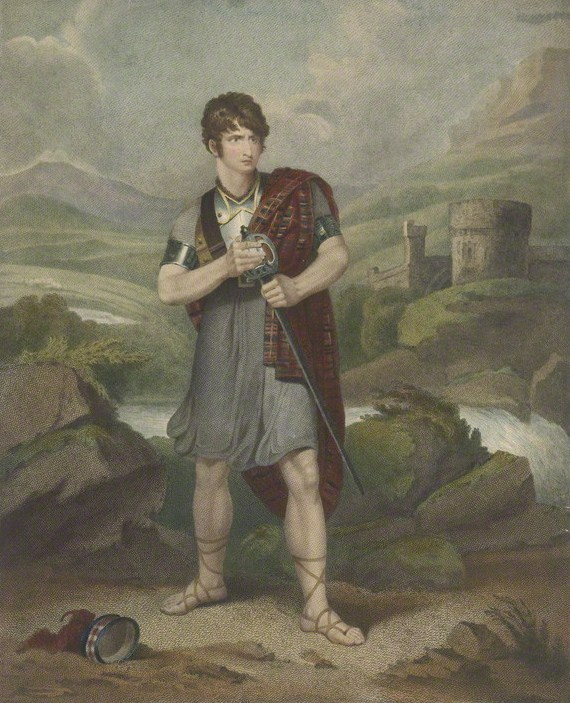
Henry Johnston in the title role of Douglas

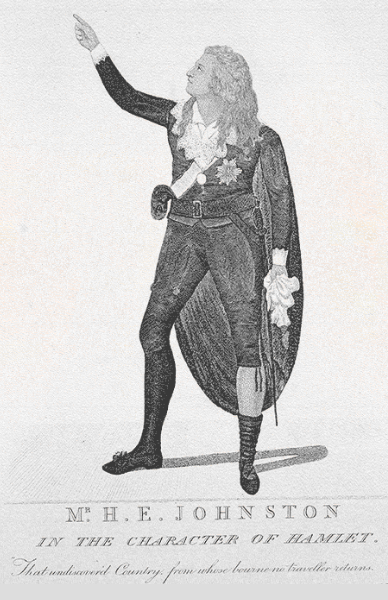
Henry Erskine Johnston in the role of Hamlet by John Kay

== Early life ==
Born in Edinburgh in May 1777 the son of a former barber on the High Street, his father was allegedly shaving Henry Erskine when he received news of his son's birth. John Kay alternatively states his father Robert Johnston (d.1826) thereafter ran the oyster tavern next to the Theatre Royal at Shakespeare Square in Edinburgh.

He was apprenticed to a lawyer but did not enjoy this and joined a linen draper for three years. He made his first appearance on the Edinburgh stage as an amateur in the part of Prince Hamlet, 9 July 1794. In 1797 while reciting "Collins Ode on the Passions" he came to the attention of Stephen Kemble who acted as his mentor; the Thespian Dictionary claimed that he also played Harlequin. His success was immediate. After playing a few nights, he crossed the sea to Dublin, where he acted twelve nights, appearing on seven of them as Norval in Douglas by John Home.

== At Covent Garden ==
Johnston's first appearance in London took place at Covent Garden Theatre, in Douglas, 23 October 1797. He was praised in the European Review. He remained at Covent Garden, with summer engagements at the Haymarket Theatre, until the season of 1802–3.

With seven other actors, Johnston signed the statement of grievances against the management of Covent Garden. After the dismissal of Joseph George Holman, he is said to have owed his re-engagement to John Fawcett, who refused to renew his contract otherwise. As Norval in Douglas he made, 15 September 1803, his first appearance at Drury Lane, playing Anhalt in Lovers' Vows by Elizabeth Inchbald on 22 September, to the Amelia of his wife. There he remained for two years, playing among other characters Petruchio and Duke Aranza in The Honey Moon (John Tobin). He returned to Covent Garden 13 October 1805, as the original Rugantino in Monk Lewis's Rugantino.

== Later life ==
As Sir Archy Macsarcasm in Love à la Mode (by Charles Macklin), Johnston was seen again at Covent Garden 10 December 1816, recorded as his first appearance there for twelve years. Sir Pertinax Macsycophant in Macklin's The Man of the World followed, 27 December, and on 10 June 1817 he was the original Baltimore at the English Opera House (the Lyceum) in an operatic version of The Election of Joanna Baillie. On 24 November 1821 he was at the Olympic the Solitary in Le Solitaire, or the Recluse of the Alps, by James Robinson Planché, apparently his last appearance in London.

At the beginning of 1823, Johnston became manager of the Caledonian Theatre (a building in Edinburgh previously known as the Circus). He opened on 11 January 1823 with Gilderoy, the Bonnie Boy, in which he played the hero, and with an address written by himself. He played Jerry Hawthorn in Tom and Jerry, and other parts, but resigned his management 7 April 1823. On 20 October 1830 he played a four nights' engagement at the same house; after which he returned to London. His major parts were Douglas, Count Romaldi in the Tale of Mystery (melodrama by Thomas Holcroft), George Barnwell in The London Merchant, Anhalt (Lovers' Vows), Alonzo in Pizarro, Merton in Marriage Promise by John Till Allingham, and Count Belfior in The Wife of Two Husbands (musical drama by James Cobb).

In 1838 he sailed to the United States with circus owner Andrew Ducrow and nothing more was heard of him.

== Family ==
In 1796, Johnston married Nanette Parker (b.1782), by whom he had six children. She first saw Johnston acting in "The Storming of Seringapatan" at the Theatre Royal, Edinburgh and instantly fell in love with him, aged only 14. They married shortly before her 15th birthday.

She acted with her husband in Ireland as Lady Contest in the Wedding Day and Josephine in the Children in the Wood. She appeared as Ophelia to her husband's Hamlet at the Haymarket, 3 September 1798, and on the 17th repeated the character at Covent Garden, where she played parts in comedy and in tragedy, including Lady Macbeth. Thomas Gilliland bemoaned the withdrawal of Mrs. Johnston from the stage and praised her Lady Randolpha Lumbercourt in the Man of the World, and her Lady Caroline Braymore in John Bull (George Colman the Younger). She was in later years separated from her husband, and in vol. vii. of William Oxberry's Dramatic Biography was said to be no longer on the stage.

== In fiction ==
Johnston features as a character in Helen Graham's novel The Real Mackay (2024).

== Notes ==
Attribution

This article incorporates text from a publication now in the public domain: Lee, Sidney, ed. (1892). "Johnston, Henry Erskine". Dictionary of National Biography. Vol. 30. London: Smith, Elder & Co.
