= Tryphosa Jane Wallis =

British actress

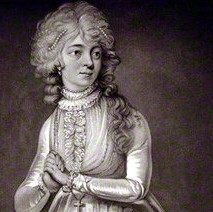
- by John Graham
- Born: 11 January 1774
- Died: 29 December 1848 (aged 74); Edmonton, Middlesex

Tryphosa Jane Wallis or Tryphosa Jane Campbell or Miss Wallis from Bath (11 January 1774 – 29 December 1848) was a British actress.

== Life ==
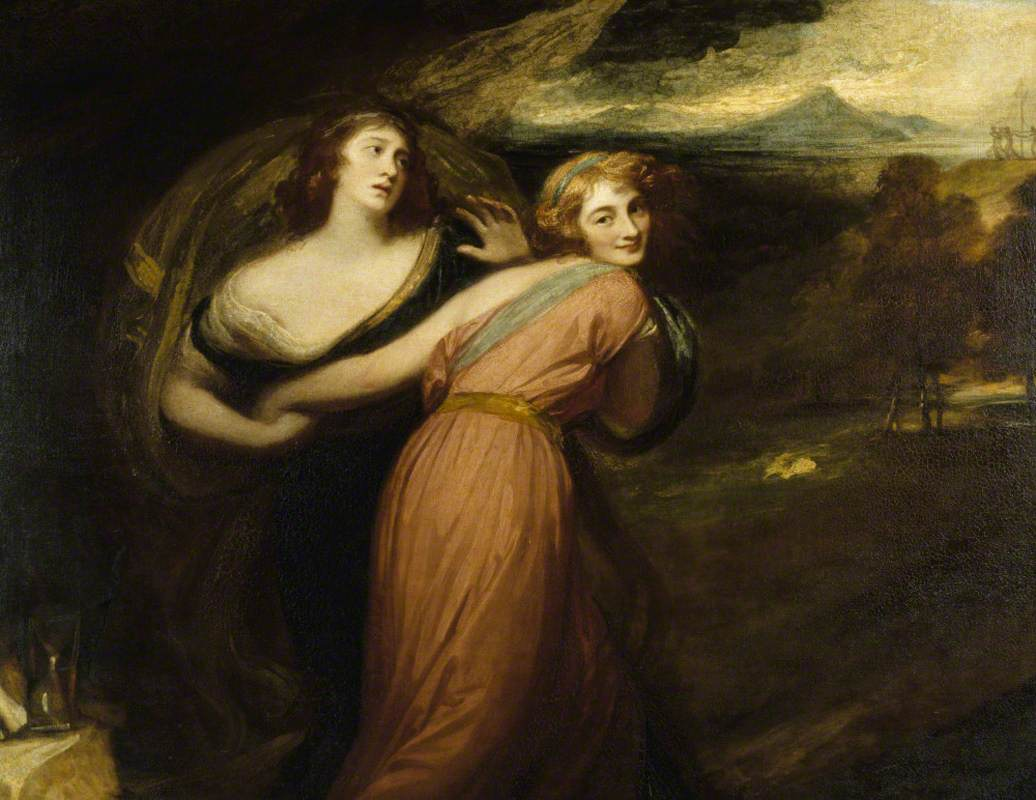
Mirth and Melancholy by George Romney in about 1789

Wallis was born on 11 January 1774 to a theatrical family in Richmond although her paternal grandfather was a church minister in Ireland. Her talent was adopted and championed by Lord and Lady Loughborough from 1785 and she went on to appear at Covent Garden in 1789. Wallis was a popular performer who sometimes experienced mixed reviews. Some thought that her success was largely due to her adoption by the Lord Chancellor of England.

She was particularly successful as an actress in Bath for several years. She was brought back to London to appear at Covent Garden by Thomas Harris who was trying to compete with competition from Drury Lane. She apologised to her followers in Bath for leaving, noting that her only motive was the inflated salary which she needed not for herself but her many siblings. This speech added to her noble reputation. At Covent Garden she was introduced as "Miss Wallis from Bath" and she appeared in a large number of leading roles.

In 1797 she married James Elijah Campbell only weeks after giving her final performance in Covent Garden. By this time she had said to have lost her nerve for playing leading roles. Wallis had been painted by John Graham and George Romney.

Wallis died on 29 December 1848 in Edmonton, Middlesex, aged 74, having survived her husband, who was a captain in the Royal Navy, and some of her seven children. She was buried at All Saints' Church, Edmonton beside her sister Margaret Tate (1775 - 1851) and numerous members of the Tate family.
