= James Boaden =

18th/19th-century English biographer, dramatist, and journalist

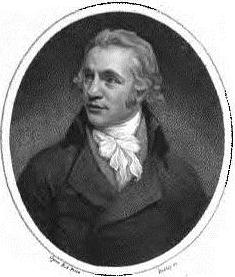
- James Boaden. Mezzotint from 1803 after a portrait by John Opie
- Born: 23 May 1762; Whitehaven, Cumberland, England
- Died: 16 February 1839 (aged 76); Lambeth, London, England
- Occupations: Journalist; writer; lecturer
- Years active: 1789–1839
- Notable work: Life of Kemble; Life of Sarah Siddons

James Boaden (23 May 1762 – 16 February 1839) was an English biographer, dramatist, and journalist.

== Biographer ==
He was the son of William Boaden, a merchant in the Russia trade. He was born at Whitehaven, Cumberland, on 23 May 1762, and at an early age came with his parents to London, where he was educated for commerce. After serving some time in a counting-house, he turned his attention to journalism, and in 1789 was appointed editor of the Oracle newspaper, which had been started in that year as a rival to the World. Boaden entered himself at the Middle Temple, but does not appear to have been called to the bar. He died on 16 February 1839.

== Dramatic works ==
Boaden's first dramatic piece was Osmyn and Daraxa, a Musical Romance, acted in 1793. His next play, Fontainville Forest, 1794, founded on Ann Radcliffe's Romance of the Forest, was received with applause at Covent Garden. From 1795 to 1803 he continued to write plays which were well received: The Secret Tribunal, 1795, based on Benedikte Naubert's Hermann von Unna; Italian Monk, 1797, founded on Mrs. Radcliffe's novel of the same name; Cambro-Britons, 1798; Aurelio and Miranda, 1799; The Voice of Nature, 1802; Maid of Bristol, 1803.

== The Shakespeare forgeries ==
In 1796, Boaden addressed to George Steevens, the Shakespearean commentator, "A Letter containing a Critical Examination of the Papers of Shakespeare published by Mr. Samuel Ireland." He stated in this letter his grounds for believing the papers held by Samuel Ireland to be spurious; but said that he, like so many others, had been at first deceived. In reply to this letter appeared an anonymous pamphlet, entitled "A Comparative Review of the Opinions of Mr. James Boaden (editor of the Oracle) in February, March, and April 1795, and of James Boaden, Esq. (author of Fontainville Forest and of a Letter to George Steevens, Esq.) in February 1796, relative to the Shakespeare MSS. By a Friend to Consistency. The Friend to Consistency (James Wyatt) pointed out that Boaden had been most enthusiastic about the "invaluable remains of our immortal bard" when they were first presented to the public."

== Biographer ==
In later life Boaden wrote biographies of celebrated actors and actresses. His ‘Life of Kemble’ (with whom he had been on terms of intimacy), in two volumes, appeared in 1825. It was followed by the ‘Life of Mrs. Siddons,’ 1827, 2 vols. 8vo, and ‘Life of Mrs. Jordan,’ 1831, 2 vols. These memoirs are in an easy style and accurate. In 1833 Boaden published his ‘Memoirs of Mrs. Inchbald,’ 2 vols, to which were added some dramatic pieces published (for the first time) from Mrs. Inchbald's manuscripts.

== Later writings ==
Boaden's attempts at novel-writing were esteemed "ingenious performances" in their day. The Man of Two Lives is the title of one, and the Doom of Giallo, or the Vision of Judgment, 1835, 2 vols, of the other. In 1824 appeared An Inquiry into the Authenticity of the various Pictures and Prints of Shakespeare, and in 1837 a tract On the Sonnets of Shakespeare, identifying the person to whom they are addressed, and elucidating several points in the Poet's History. The writer maintains that the Mr. W. H. to whom the sonnets were dedicated was William Herbert, a view adopted also by later scholars. The essay first appeared in some numbers of the Gentleman's Magazine in 1832.

== Family ==
He left nine children, including artist John Boaden and playwright Caroline Boaden.
