= Joseph Shepherd Munden =

18th/19th-century British actor (1758–1832)

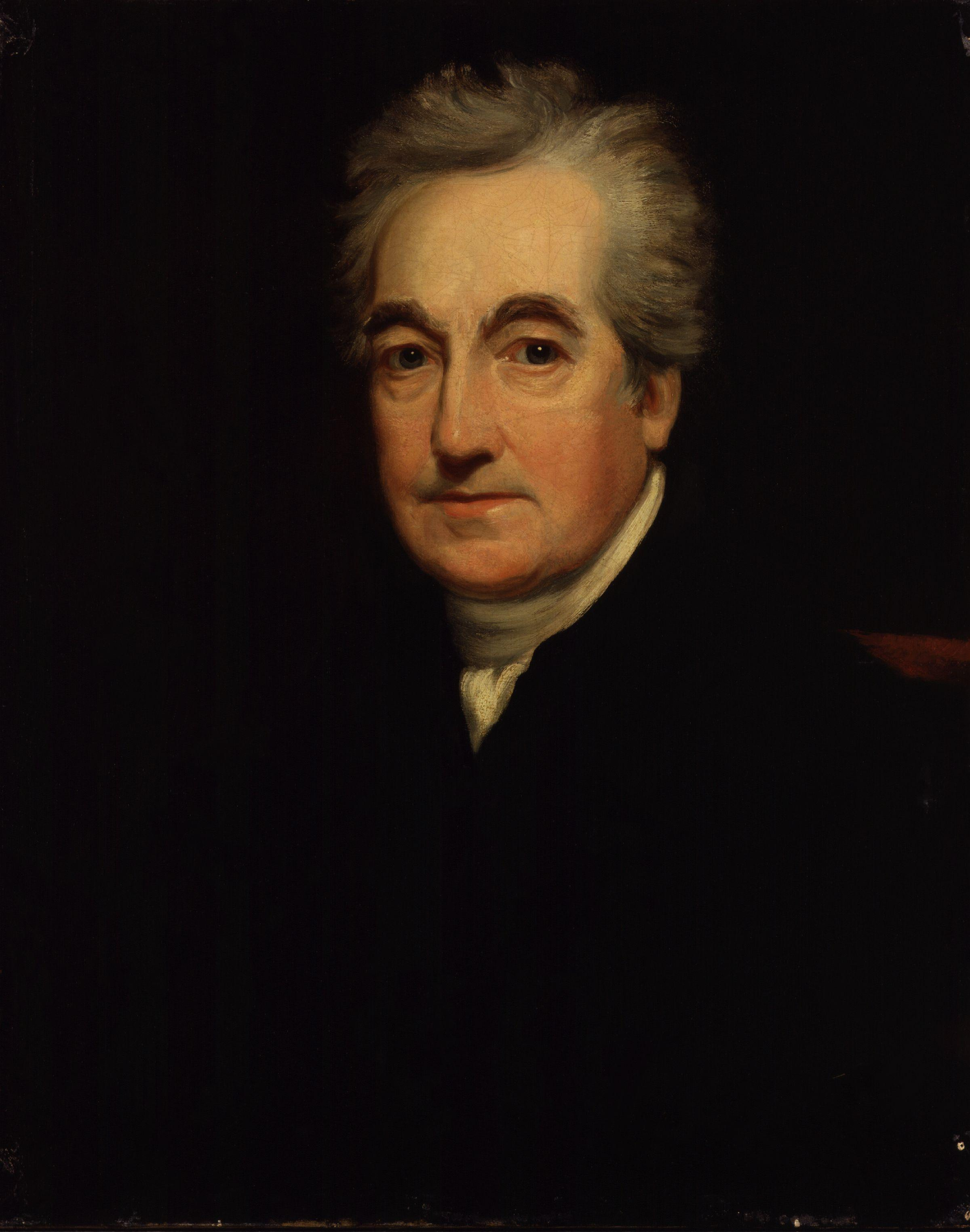
- Portrait by George Clint, c.1822-1824
- Born: 1758; London, Great Britain
- Died: 6 February 1832 (aged 73–74); Russell Square, London, British Empire
- Occupations: Actor, Manager

Joseph Shepherd Munden (1758 – 6 February 1832) was an English actor.

He had a long provincial experience as actor and manager. His first London appearance was in 1790 at Covent Garden, where he mostly remained until 1811, becoming a leading comedian. In 1813 he was at Drury Lane. He retired in 1824.

== Early life ==
Munden was the son of a poulterer in Brook's Market, Leather Lane, Holborn. He ran away from home to join a strolling company. He was by the age of twelve in an apothecary's shop; subsequently he was apprenticed to Mr. Druce, a law stationer in Chancery Lane. In Liverpool he was engaged for a while in the office of the town clerk, also appearing on the stage as an extra.

After some experience of repertory companies, Munden was engaged to play old men at Leatherhead. He began to make his mark at Canterbury under the manager Hurst, where in 1780 he was the original Faddle in Mrs. Burgess's comedy, The Oaks, or the Beauties of Canterbury. In the company of Joseph Austin and Charles Edward Whitlock in Chester he held a recognised position, and he toured the country. Munden was then able to borrow money purchase the share of Austin in the management of northern theatres. Here he played the leading comic business, rising in reputation and fortune.

A liaison with an actress named Mary Jones, who deserted him after having by him four children, marred his reputation. He married, 20 October 1789, at the parish church of St. Oswald, Chester, Frances Butler, five years his senior, an actress of the Chester company who then retired from the stage.

== At Covent Garden ==
After the death in 1790 of John Edwin, Munden was engaged for Covent Garden Theatre. Having sold to Stephen Kemble his share in the provincial theatres, he came to London with his wife, living first in Portugal Street, Clare Market, and then in Catherine Street, Strand. On 2 December 1790, as Sir Francis Gripe in the Busy Body (by Susanna Centlivre) and Jemmy Jumps in the Farmer (by John O'Keeffe), the latter being a part created by Edwin two or three years earlier, he made his first appearance in London, and had a warm reception.

At Covent Garden, with occasional summer appearances at the Haymarket Theatre, and excursions into the provinces, Munden remained until 1811, rising gradually to the position of the most celebrated comedian of his day. On 4 February 1791 he was the original Sir Samuel Sheepy in Thomas Holcroft's School for Arrogance, an adaptation of Le glorieux of Philippe Néricault Destouches. On 14 March he was the first Frank in O'Keeffe's Modern Antiques, and 16 April the earliest Ephraim Smooth in O'Keeffe's Wild Oats.

Munden played between two and three hundred characters. In pieces of George Colman, Thomas Morton, Frederick Reynolds, and other dramatists of the day he took principal parts. His Old Dornton in Holcroft's Road to Ruin, 18 February 1792, was an immediate success, and remained a favourite to the end of his career At the Haymarket, 15 July 1797, he was the first Zekiel Homespun in George Colman the younger's The Heir at Law. At Covent Garden he was, 12 January 1799, Oakworth in Joseph George Holman's The Votary of Wealth; 8 February 1800 Sir Abel Handy in Morton's Speed the Plough, and 1 May 1800 Dominique in James Cobb's Paul and Virginia. This season saw the dispute between the principal actors of Covent Garden and Thomas Harris the manager. Munden was one of the signatories of the appeal which Lord Salisbury the lord chamberlain, as arbitrator, rejected in every point. Munden at the close of the season visited Dublin, Birmingham, Chester, and elsewhere. In 1802, Munden leased a house on Highgate Road, Dartmouth Park, close to the present day Croftdown Road, and lived there until he sold the lease in 1819.

At the close of the 1811 season Munden quarrelled with the management on financial questions, and did not set his foot in the theatre again, except for a benefit. At the Haymarket he played, 26 July 1811, Casimere in the Quadrupeds of Quedlinburgh, taken by Colman the younger from The Rovers (a piece in the Anti-Jacobin, by George Canning, John Hookham Frere, and George Ellis). He was again at the Haymarket in 1812. During the two years, 1811-3, however, he was mainly in the country, playing in Edinburgh (where he was introduced to Walter Scott), Newcastle, Rochdale, Chester, Manchester, and elsewhere. He earned large sums of money, but began for the first time to be called tight-fisted.

== Drury Lane ==
On 4 October 1813, as Sir Abel Handy in Speed the Plough, Munden made his first appearance at Drury Lane where, 11 March 1815, he created one of his great roles, Dozey, an old sailor, in Thomas John Dibdin's Past Ten o'Clock and a Rainy Night. On 14 December 1815 he was Vandunke in the Merchant of Bruges, Douglas Kinnaird's alteration of the Beggar's Bush of Beaumont and Fletcher. At Drury Lane he played fewer original parts of importance, the last being General Van in Edward Knight's Veteran, or the Farmer's Sons, 23 February 1822. He had been in bad health, and took his farewell of the stage 31 May 1824, playing Sir Robert Bramble and Old Dozey, and reciting a farewell address.

Munden after his retirement was mostly confined to the house, where he was nursed by his wife. He made bad investments, but refused invitations to reappear, and after the death of a favourite daughter spent most of his time in bed. He died 6 February 1832 in Bernard Street, Russell Square, and was buried in the vaults of St George's, Bloomsbury. The disposition of his property, including a poor provision for his wife, who died in 1836, caused comment.

== Family ==
Munden left several children. A son, Thomas Shepherd Munden, who died at Islington in July 1850, aged 50, wrote his father's biography.

== Selected roles ==
- Ennui in The Dramatist by Frederick Reynolds (1789)
- Lord Jargon in Notoriety by Frederick Reynolds (1791)
- Bribon in Columbus by Thomas Morton (1792)
- Frost in The Irishman in London by William Macready the Elder (1792)
- Mister Harmony in Everyone Has His Fault by Elizabeth Inchbald (1793)
- Sir Thomas Roundhead in How to Grow Rich by Frederick Reynolds (1793)
- Flush in The Rage by Frederick Reynolds (1794)
- Project in Speculation by Frederick Reynolds (1795)
- Sir Marmaduke in The Doldrum by John O'Keeffe (1796)
- Sir William Dorillon in Wives as They Were and Maids as They Are by Elizabeth Inchbald (1797)
- Bonus in Laugh When You Can by Frederick Reynolds (1798)
- Shenkin in Cambro-Britons by James Boaden (1798)
- Paul Primitive in Life by Frederick Reynolds (1800)
- Old Liberal The School for Prejudice by Thomas Dibdin (1801)
- Sapling in Delays and Blunders by Frederick Reynolds (1802)
- Sir Peter Presser in The Three Per Cents by Frederick Reynolds (1803)
- Old Harebrain The Will for the Deed by Thomas Dibdin (1804)
- Major Tornado in The Delinquent by Frederick Reynolds (1805)
- Torrent in Who Wants a Guinea? by George Colman the Younger (1805)
- Lord Danberry in To Marry or Not to Marry by Elizabeth Inchbald (1805)
