= George Colman the Younger =

English dramatist and writer (1762–1836)

George Colman
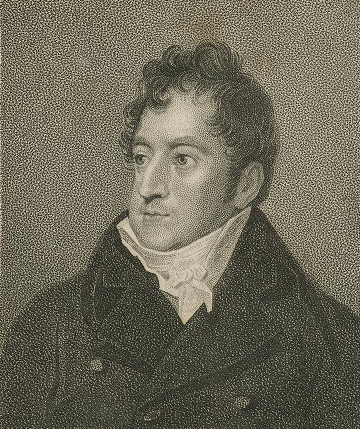
- Born: 21 October 1762
- Died: 17 October 1836 (aged 73); Brompton, London
- Education: Westminster School; Christ Church, Oxford; King's College, Aberdeen
- Occupations: Playwright; examiner of plays

George Colman (21 October 1762 – 17 October 1836), known as "the Younger", was an English dramatist and miscellaneous writer. He was the son of George Colman the Elder.

== Life ==
He passed from Westminster School to Christ Church, Oxford, and King's College, University of Aberdeen, and was finally entered as a student of law at Lincoln's Inn, London. While in Aberdeen, he published a poem satirizing Charles James Fox, called The Man of the People. In 1782 he produced his first play, The Female Dramatist, at his father's playhouse in the Haymarket.

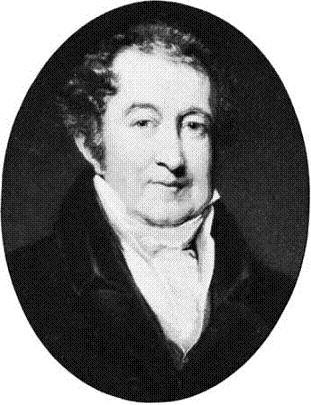
George Colman the Younger, by John Jackson

The failing health of the elder Colman obliged him to relinquish the management of the Haymarket theatre in 1789, when the younger George succeeded him, at a yearly salary of £600. On the death of the father the patent was continued to the son; however, difficulties arose, as he was involved in litigation with Thomas Harris and was unable to pay the expenses of the performances at the Haymarket. He was forced to take sanctuary within the Rules of the King's Bench Prison. He resided for many years while he continued to direct the affairs of his theatre.

Released through the kindness of George IV, who had appointed him exon. of the Yeomen of the Guard, a dignity Colman disposed to the highest bidder. In 1824, the duke of Montrose—then Lord Chamberlain—made him the examiner of plays. He held this position until his death, to the disgust of all contemporary dramatists, to whose manuscripts he was illiberal and severe equally. Although his own productions were open to charges of indecency and profanity, he censored others’ work to the extent that he would not pass even such words as "heaven", "providence" or "angel".

He had, as early as 1784, contracted a runaway marriage with an actress, Clara Morris, to whose brother David Morris, he disposed of his share in the Haymarket theatre eventually. He wrote many of the leading parts in his plays for Maria Gibbs (née Logan) especially, whom he married at Clerkenwell in June 1836 after the death of his first wife that January. She was identified in her will as Mary Colman, widow. George Colman had two sons, George Francis Charles (b. 1785 or 86 - d. before 1856) and Edmund Craven (b. 1802).

He died in Brompton, London. He was buried alongside his father in Kensington Church.

== Works ==
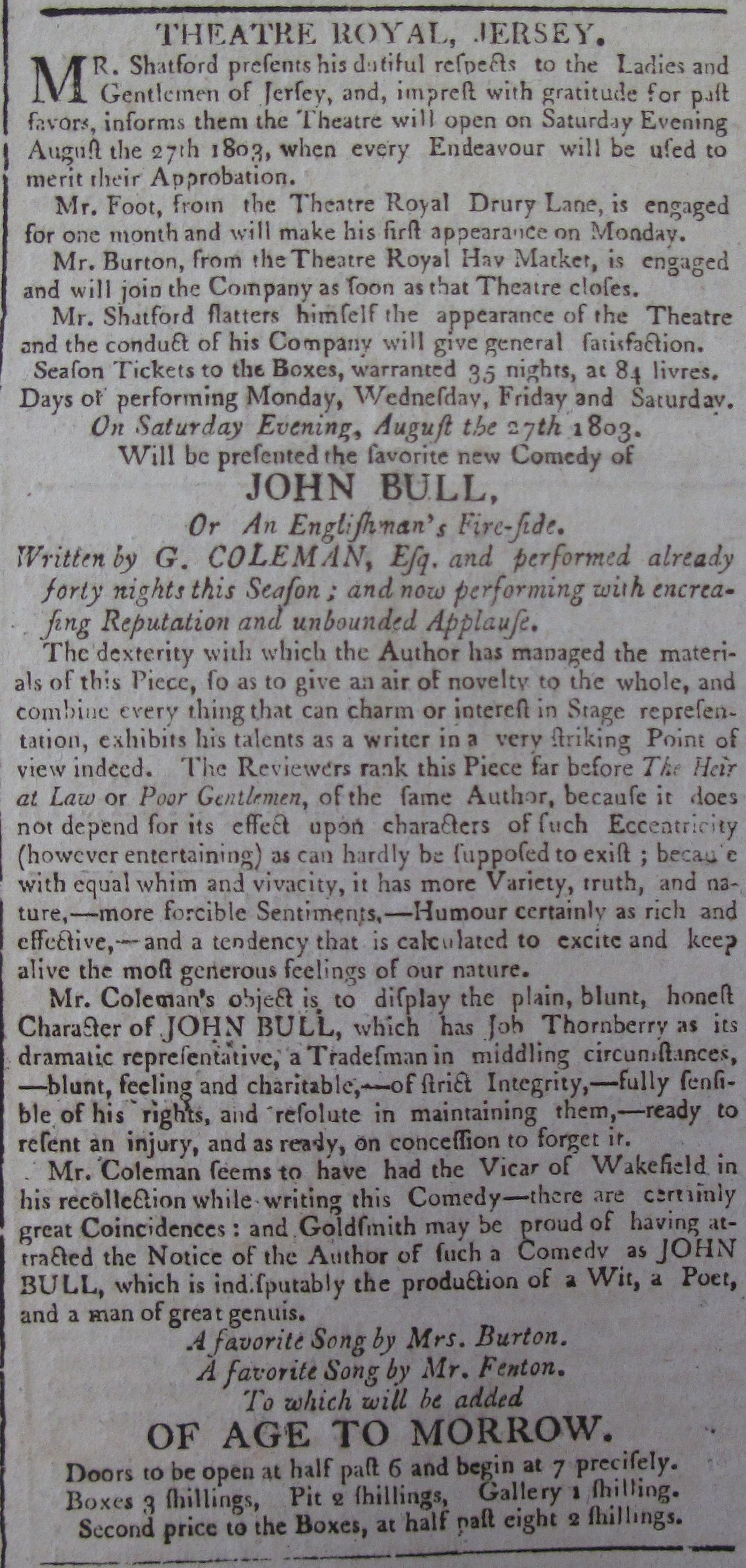
An advertisement for a performance in Jersey on 27 September 1803 of "the favorite new Comedy of John Bull, Or An Englishman's Fire-side. Written by G. COLEMAN, Esq, and performed already forty nights this Season; and now performing with encreasing Reputation and unbounded Applause."

His comedies are a curious mixture of genuine comic force and sentimentality. A collection of them was published (1827) in Paris, with a life of the author, by J. W. Lake.

His first play, The Female Dramatist (1782), for which Smollett's Roderick Random supplied the materials, was unanimously condemned, but Two to One (1784) was entirely successful. It was followed by Turk and no Turk (1785), a musical comedy; Inkle and Yarico (1787), an opera; Ways and Means (1788); The Surrender of Calais (1791); The Battle of Hexham (1793); The Iron Chest (1796), taken from William Godwin's Adventures of Caleb Williams; The Heir at Law (1797), which enriched the stage with one immortal character, "Dr Pangloss" (borrowed of course from Voltaire's Candide); The Poor Gentleman (1802); John Bull, or an Englishman's Fireside (1803), his most successful piece; and numerous other pieces, many of them adapted from the French. His comic opera Love Laughs at Locksmiths is the first known appearance of the folk song The Unfortunate Miss Bailey, which became a popular hit in early 1800's New York. The song was later included in folk song collections including the Burl Ives songbook, and was recorded by The Kingston Trio on their album Here We Go Again! in 1959. Folklorists at the Traditional Ballad Index attribute authorship of the song to either of the George Colmans, but surmise that the Younger is the more likely.

Colman, whose witty conversation made him a favourite, was also the author of a great deal of so-called humorous poetry (mostly coarse, though much of it was popular) – My Night Gown and Slippers (1797), reprinted under the name of Broad Grins, in 1802; and Poetical Vagaries (1812). Some of his writings were published under the assumed name of Arthur Griffinhood of Turnham Green.

== Literary hoaxes ==
After his death, Colman was stated falsely to have been the author of certain pornographic works. The Rodiad, on flagellation, was published by John Camden Hotten in 1871, dated to 1810 and ascribed to Colman falsely; the true author may have been Richard Monckton Milnes, 1st Baron Houghton. Canadian author John Glassco maintained and extended the hoax in 1967 by repeating the attribution and also claiming that Colman wrote his Squire Hardman.

== Selected plays ==
- John Bull (1803)
- Who Wants a Guinea? (1805)
