= Thomas John Dibdin =

English dramatist and songwriter

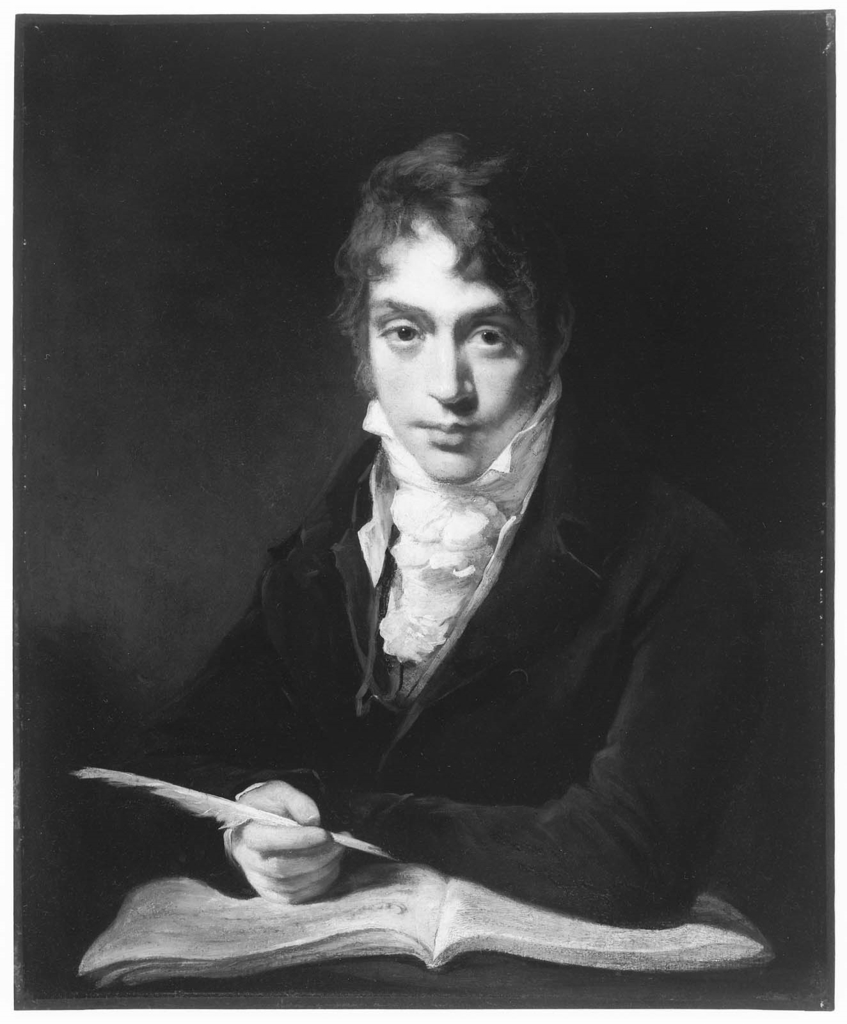
Thomas John Dibdin by William Owen, oil on canvas

Thomas John Dibdin (21 March 1771 – 16 September 1841) was an English dramatist and songwriter.

== Life ==
Dibdin was the son of Charles Dibdin, a songwriter and theatre manager, and of "Mrs Davenet", an actress whose real name was Harriett Pitt. He was introduced to the stage at five years old, in his godfather David Garrick’s pageant of ‘’Jubilee of Shakespeare’’. Mrs Siddons was The Venus and the Young Tom Cupid. He was apprenticed to his maternal uncle, a London upholsterer, and later to William Rawlins, afterwards sheriff of London. He summoned his second master unsuccessfully for rough treatment; and after a few years of service he ran away to join a company of country players. From 1789 to 1795 he played all sorts of parts; he worked as a scene painter at Liverpool in 1791; and during this period he composed more than 1,000 songs.

His first work as a dramatist was Something New, followed by The Mad Guardian in 1795. He returned to London in 1795, having married two years before; and in the winter of 1798–99 The Jew and the Doctor was produced at Theatre Royal, Covent Garden. From this time he contributed a very large number of comedies, operas, farces, etc., to the public entertainment, including (in 1802) the comic opera Family Quarrels. Some of these brought immense popularity to the writer and immense profits to the theatres. It is stated that the pantomime of Mother Goose (1807) produced more than £20,000 for the management at Covent Garden theatre, and the High-mettled Racer, adapted as a pantomime from his father's play, £18,000 at Astley's.

Dibdin was prompter and pantomime writer at Theatre Royal, Drury Lane until 1816, when he took over the Surrey Theatre. This venture proved disastrous, and he became bankrupt. After this, he was manager of the Haymarket Theatre, but without his old success, and his last years were passed in comparative poverty. In 1827 he published two volumes of Reminiscences; and at the time of his death he was preparing an edition of his father's sea songs, for which a small sum was allowed him weekly by the Lords of the Admiralty. Of his own songs, "The Oak Table" and "The Snug Little Island" were popular at the time. He died leaving a widow (second wife) and young family.

Charles Dickens quotes from Dibdin's patriotic song "The Snug Little Island" in Little Dorrit:

Daddy Neptune one day to Freedom did say,
"If ever I lived upon dry land.
The spot I should hit on would be little Britain!"
Says Freedom, "Why that's my own island!"
Oh, it's a snug little island!
A right little, tight little island,
Search the globe round, none can be found
So happy as this little island.

The song was published posthumously in 1841 in the Addenda (containing songs of T. Dibdin) to Songs of the Late Charles Dibdin, a collection arranged by Thomas Dibdin with sketches by George Cruikshank. A copy was found in Dickens's library after his death.

== Family ==
Dibdin married Nancy Hilliar in 1793. Their granddaughter Eve Mary Dibdin married the tea salesman William Heseltine and was the great grandmother of the British politician Michael Heseltine.

== Selected works ==
- The Mouth of the Nile (1798)
- Five Thousand a Year (1799), play
- The Birth Day (1799)
- The School for Prejudice (1801)
- Guilty or Not Guilty (1804)
- The Will for the Deed (1804)
- Five Miles Off (1806)
- Errors Excepted (1807)
- The Secret Mine, 1812 play
- The Ninth Statue 1814
- Zuma
- The Lily of St. Leonards 1819
- The Ruffian Boy, 1820 adapted from Mrs. Opie, and The Fate of Calas
