= 1787 in literature =

This article contains information about the literary events and publications of 1787.

== Events ==
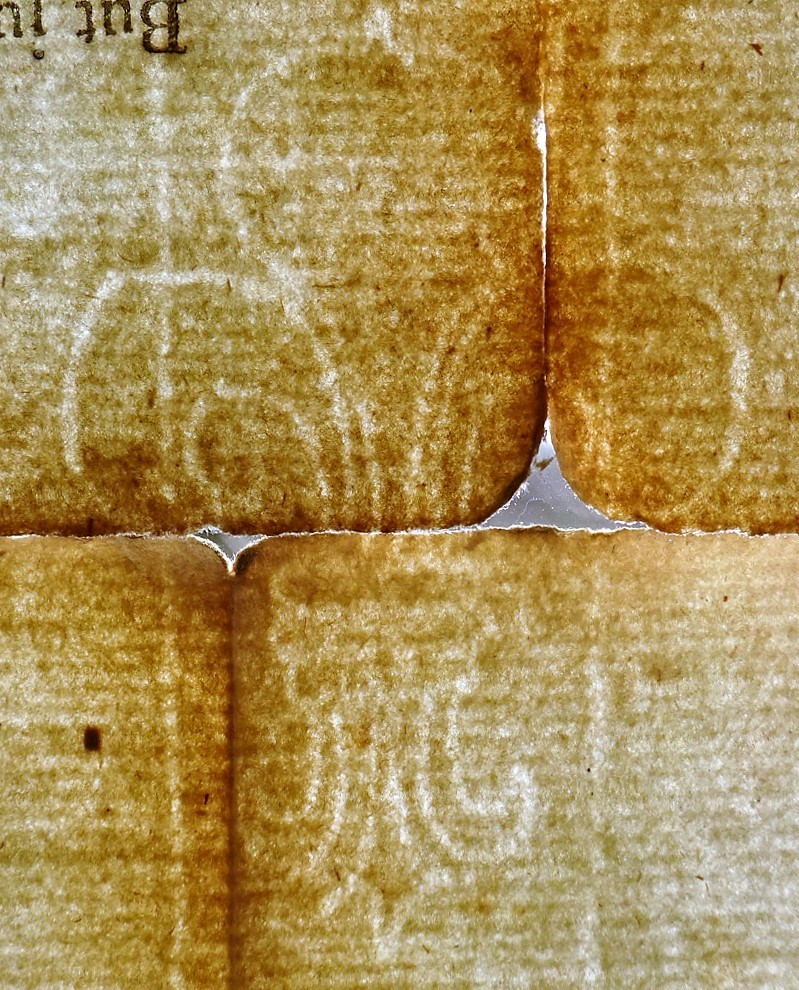
The fleur-de-lis watermark of the handmade paper in Poems, Chiefly in the Scottish dialect.

- January 15 – Ann Ward marries William Radcliffe, gaining the surname by which she will be known as a writer of Gothic novels.
- April 16 – Royall Tyler's The Contrast becomes the first comedy written by an American citizen to be professionally produced.It was staged at the John Street Theatre.
- April 17 – The Edinburgh edition of Robert Burns' Poems, Chiefly in the Scottish dialect is published by William Creech. It includes a Burns portrait by Alexander Nasmyth. The poet has great social success in the city's literary circles; 16-year-old Walter Scott meets him at the house of Adam Ferguson.
- May 11 – An Enquiry into the Principles on Which a Commercial System for the United States of America Should Be Founded, is written by Tench Coxe. It is read by The Society for Political Inquiries in Philadelphia, before the Constitutional Convention.
- June 1 – King George III of Great Britain issues a Proclamation for the Discouragement of Vice, which can be used to prosecute obscene publications.
- June 27 – Just before midnight, Edward Gibbon completes The History of the Decline and Fall of the Roman Empire in the small summerhouse in his garden in Lausanne, Switzerland.
- July – Friedrich Schiller arrives in Weimar.
- November 21 – François-Joseph Talma makes his professional stage debut at the Comédie-Française as Seide, in Voltaire's Mahomet.
- December 4 – Robert Burns meets Agnes Maclehose at a party given by Miss Erskine Nimmo.

== New books ==
=== Fiction ===
- Elizabeth Bonhôte – Olivia, or, The Deserted Bride
- Jean-Baptiste Louvet de Couvrai – Les Amours du chevalier de Faublas
- Johann Wolfgang von Goethe – The Sorrows of Young Werther (revised edition)
- Johann Jakob Wilhelm Heinse – Ardinghello and die glückseligen Inseln
- Elizabeth Helme – Louisa; or the Cottage on the Moor
- Johann Karl August Musäus – Volksmärchen der Deutschen (fifth volume)
- Elizabeth Sophia Tomlins – The Victim of Fancy
- Betje Wolff and Aagje Deken – Abraham Blankaart

=== Children ===
- François Guillaume Ducray-Duminil – Fanfan et Lolotte, ou Histoire de deux enfants abandonnés dans une île déserte (Fanfan and Lolotte, Story of Two Children Abandoned on a Desert Island)

=== Drama ===
- Pierre Beaumarchais – Tarare (opera)
- George Colman the Elder –The Village Lawyer
- George Colman the Younger – Inkle and Yarico (comic opera)
- Richard Cumberland – The Country Attorney
- Germaine de Staël – Jeanne Grey
- Thomas Holcroft – Seduction
- Elizabeth Inchbald
  - All on a Summer's Day
  - The Midnight Hour
  - Such Things Are
- Harriet Lee – The New Peerage
- Andrew Macdonald –Vimonda
- Friedrich Schiller – Don Karlos, Infant von Spanien
- Royall Tyler – The Contrast

=== Non-fiction ===
- Thomas Best – A Concise Treatise on the Art of Angling
- Mathurin Jacques Brisson – Pesanteur Spécifique des Corps
- Ottobah Cugoano – Thoughts and Sentiments on the Evil and Wicked Traffic of the Slavery and Commerce of the Human Species
- (Sir) John Fenn (ed.) – The Paston Letters (Original letters, written during the reigns of Henry VI, Edward IV, and Richard III)
- John Hawkins – Life of Samuel Johnson
- 'Publius' (Alexander Hamilton, James Madison and John Jay) – The Federalist papers (serial publication begins with Hamilton's "Federalist No. 1 – General Introduction" in The Independent Journal (New York City), October 27)
- Scots Musical Museum, vol. 1
- Mary Wollstonecraft – Thoughts on the Education of Daughters

== Births ==
- February 2 – Charles Etienne Boniface, French music teacher, playwright and journalist (died 1853)
- February 17 – George Mogridge ("Old Humphrey"), English children's writer and poet (died 1854)
- February 23 – Emma Willard, American teacher and writer (died 1870)
- March 7 – George Bethune English, American explorer and writer (died 1828)
- April 26 – Ludwig Uhland, German poet (died 1862)
- May 29 – Konstantin Batyushkov, Russian poet, essayist and translator (died 1855)
- July 9 – Taliesin Williams, Welsh poet and author (died 1847)
- September 13 – John Adamson, English antiquary and expert on Portuguese (died 1855)
- November 4 – Edmund Kean, English actor (died 1833)
- November 15 – Richard Henry Dana Sr., American poet, critic and lawyer (died 1879)
- November 21 – Bryan Procter, English poet who wrote under the pseudonym Barry Cornwall (died 1874)
- December 16 – Mary Russell Mitford, English novelist (died 1855)

== Deaths ==
- April 1 – Floyer Sydenham, English classical scholar and translator (born 1710)
- April 2 – Francisco Javier Clavijero, Mexican-born historian (born 1731)
- May 4 – Philip Skelton, Irish clergyman and writer (born 1707)
- June 19 – John Brown, Scottish theologian (born 1722)
- October 28 – Johann Karl August Musäus, German satirist and children's writer (born 1735)
- October 30 – Ferdinando Galiani, Italian economist (born 1728)
- November 3 – Robert Lowth, English poet, grammarian and bishop (born 1710)
- December 18 – Soame Jenyns, English poet and essayist (born 1704)
