= The World as it Goes =

- Original language: English
- Written by: Hannah Cowley
- Genre: Comedy

Premiere
- Date: 24 February 1781
- Place: Covent Garden Theatre, London

The World as It Goes is a 1781 comedy play by the British writer Hannah Cowley.

The original cast included William Thomas Lewis as Sir Charles Danvers, Charles Lee Lewes as Fairfax, John Quick as Grub, Richard Wilson as Colonel Sparwell, John Edwin as Bronze, Ralph Wewitzer as Von Irkin, Isabella Mattocks as Mrs Sparwell, Lydia Webb as Molly Grub, Elizabeth Inchbald as Sidney Grubb and Elizabeth Younge as Lady Danvers.

== Bibliography ==
- Nicoll, Allardyce. A History of English Drama 1660–1900: Volume III. Cambridge University Press, 2009. ISBN 978-0-521-10930-7.
- Hogan, C.B (ed.) The London Stage, 1660–1800: Volume V. Southern Illinois University Press, 1968.
- Hannah Cowley, ‘’The World As It Goes’’, edited by William D. Brewer, Anthem Press, 2022.
