= Appearance Is Against Them =

1785 play

- Written by: Elizabeth Inchbald
- Original language: English
- Genre: Comedy
- Setting: England, present day

Premiere
- Date premiered: 22 October 1785
- Place premiered: Theatre Royal, Covent Garden, London

Appearance Is Against Them is a 1785 comedy play by the British writer Elizabeth Inchbald. A farce, it premiered as an afterpiece at the Theatre Royal, Covent Garden in London on 22 October 1785. The original cast included John Quick as Mr Walsmley, John Palmer as Lord Lighthead, James Thompson as Thompson, William Swords as Lighthead's Servant, John Edwin as Humphry, Lydia Webb as Lady Mary Magipie, Mary Morton as Miss Angle and Sarah Maria Wilson as Fish. The Irish premiere took place at the Smock Alley Theatre in Dublin on 4 February 1786.

== Bibliography ==
- Greene, John C. Theatre in Dublin, 1745-1820: A Calendar of Performances, Volume 6. Lexington Books, 2011.
- Nicoll, Allardyce. A History of English Drama 1660–1900: Volume III. Cambridge University Press, 2009.
- Hogan, C.B (ed.) The London Stage, 1660–1800: Volume V. Southern Illinois University Press, 1968.
- Robertson, Ben P. Elizabeth Inchbald's Reputation: A Publishing and Reception History. Routledge, 2015.
- Watson, George. The New Cambridge Bibliography of English Literature: Volume 2, 1660–1800. Cambridge University Press, 1971.
