= The Toy (play) =

1789 play

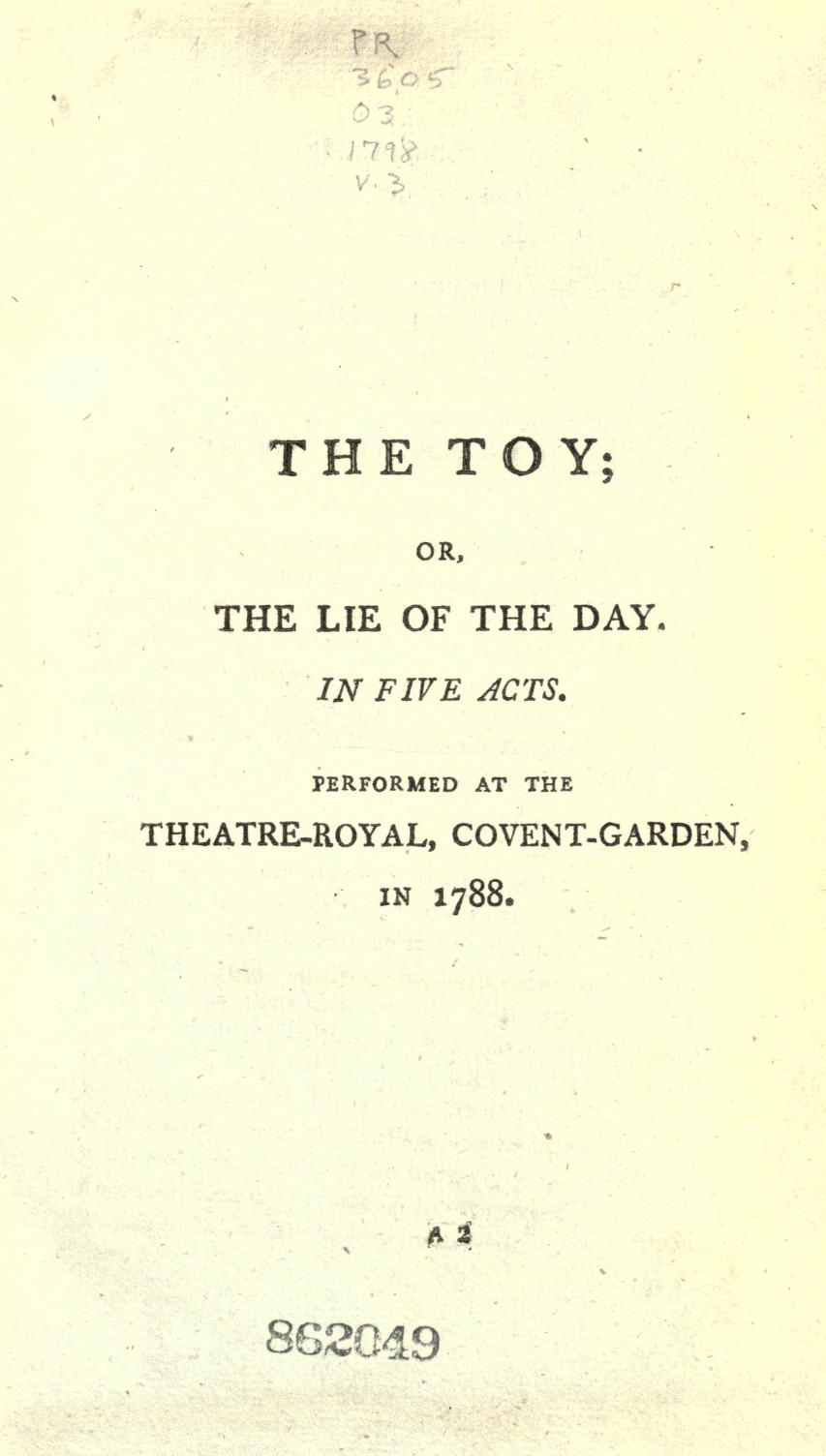
- Original language: English
- Written by: John O'Keeffe
- Genre: Comedy
- Setting: Hampton Court, England

Premiere
- Date: 3 February 1789
- Place: Theatre Royal, Covent Garden, London

The Toy is a 1789 comedy play by the Irish writer John O'Keeffe. It premiered at the Theatre Royal, Covent Garden in London on 3 February 1789. The Irish premiere was at the Crow Street Theatre in Dublin on 13 January 1791.

== Cast ==
The original cast included:

- Francis Aickin as Sir Carrol O'Donovan,
- Joseph George Holman as O'Donovan,
- William Thomas Lewis as Aircourt,
- William Blanchard as Larry Kavanagh,
- John Quick as Alibi,
- Cockran Joseph Booth as Nol Pros,
- John Edwin as Methlegin,
- Ralph Wewitzer as Pavot,
- Ann Brunton Merry as Lady Jane,
- Louisa Fontenelle as Sophia, and
- Lydia Webb as Katty Kavanagh.

== Bibliography ==
- Greene, John C. Theatre in Dublin, 1745-1820: A Calendar of Performances, Volume 6. Lexington Books, 2011.
- Nicoll, Allardyce. A History of English Drama 1660–1900: Volume III. Cambridge University Press, 2009.
- Hogan, C.B (ed.) The London Stage, 1660–1800: Volume V. Southern Illinois University Press, 1968.
