= Everyone Has His Fault =

1793 play

- Written by: Elizabeth Inchbald
- Original language: English
- Genre: Comedy
- Setting: London, present day

Premiere
- Date premiered: 29 January 1793
- Place premiered: Theatre Royal, Covent Garden, London

Everyone Has His Fault is a 1793 comedy play by the British writer Elizabeth Inchbald. It premiered at the Theatre Royal, Covent Garden on 29 January 1793. The original cast included William Farren as Lord Norland, William Thomas Lewis as Sir Robert Ramble, John Quick as Mr Solus, Joseph Shepherd Munden as Mister Harmony, John Fawcett as Mr Placid, Alexander Pope as Mr Irwin, James Thompson as Porter, Jane Pope as Lady Eleanor Irwin, Isabella Mattocks as Mrs Placid, Mrs Webb as Mrs Spinster and Harriet Pye Esten as Miss Wooburn. The Irish premiere took place at the Crow Street Theatre in Dublin on 17 July 1793.

== Bibliography ==
- Greene, John C. Theatre in Dublin, 1745-1820: A Calendar of Performances, Volume 6. Lexington Books, 2011.
- Nicoll, Allardyce. A History of English Drama 1660–1900: Volume IV. Cambridge University Press, 2009.
- Robertson, Ben P. Elizabeth Inchbald's Reputation: A Publishing and Reception History. Routledge, 2015.
