= Fashionable Levities =

1785 play

- Written by: Leonard MacNally
- Original language: English
- Genre: Comedy
- Setting: Bath, present day

Premiere
- Date premiered: 7 April 1785
- Place premiered: Theatre Royal, Covent Garden, London

Fashionable Levities is a 1785 comedy play by the Irish writer Leonard MacNally. It premiered at the Theatre Royal, Covent Garden in London on 7 April 1785. The original cast included William Thomas Lewis as Welford, John Quick as Sir Buzzard Savage, Richard Wroughton as Captain Douglas, Ralph Wewitzer as Colonel Staff, John Edwin as Nicholas, John Henderson as Mr Ordeal, Margaret Martyr as Clara, Sarah Maria Wilson as Grace and Mrs Webb as Honour. MacNally dedicated the play to the Anglo-Irish aristocrat the Countess of Salisbury. The Dublin premiere took place at the Crow Street Theatre on 5 April 1786.

== Bibliography ==
- Greene, John C. Theatre in Dublin, 1745-1820: A Calendar of Performances, Volume 6. Lexington Books, 2011.
- Nicoll, Allardyce. A History of English Drama 1660–1900: Volume III. Cambridge University Press, 2009.
- Hogan, C.B (ed.) The London Stage, 1660–1800: Volume V. Southern Illinois University Press, 1968.
