= He Would Be a Soldier =

1786 play

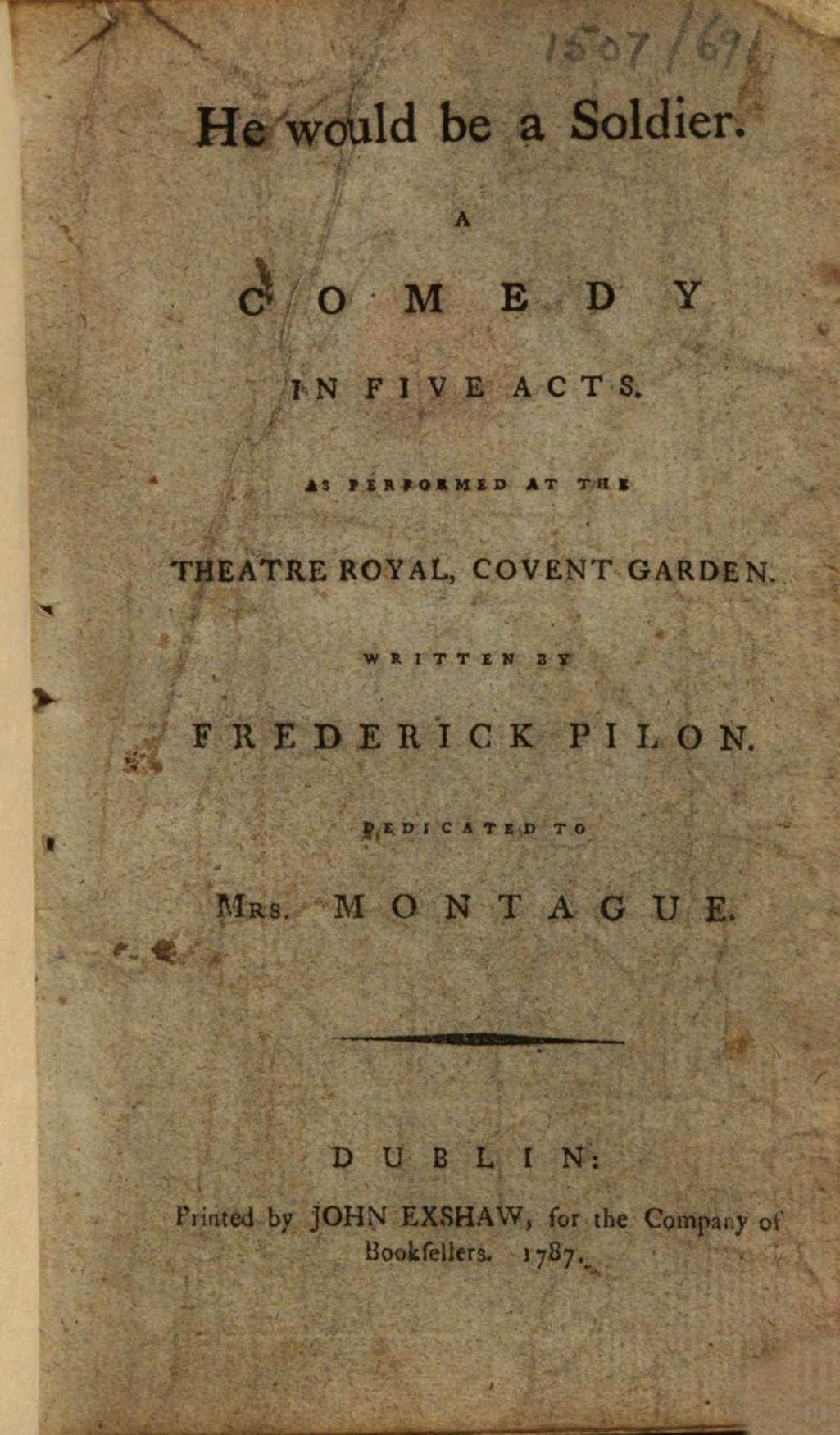
- Written by: Frederick Pilon
- Original language: English
- Genre: Comedy
- Setting: England, present day

Premiere
- Date premiered: 18 November 1786
- Place premiered: Theatre Royal, Covent Garden, London

He Would Be a Soldier is a 1786 comedy play by the Irish writer Frederick Pilon. It premiered at the Theatre Royal, Covent Garden on 18 November 1786. The original cast included Francis Aickin as Colonel Talbot, John Quick as Sir Oliver Oldstock, William Thomas Lewis as Captain Crevelt, William Farren as Mandeville, Ralph Wewitzer as Count Pierpoint, James Fearon as Wilkins, John Edwin as Caleb, James Thompson as Caleb, Elizabeth Pope as Charlotte, Lydia Webb as Lady Oldstock and Mary Wells as Harriet. The Irish premiere took place at the Smock Alley Theatre in Dublin on 2 January 1787

== Bibliography ==
- Greene, John C. Theatre in Dublin, 1745-1820: A Calendar of Performances, Volume 6. Lexington Books, 2011.
- Nicoll, Allardyce. A History of English Drama 1660–1900: Volume III. Cambridge University Press, 2009.
- Hogan, C.B (ed.) The London Stage, 1660–1800: Volume V. Southern Illinois University Press, 1968.
