= All on a Summer's Day =

1787 play

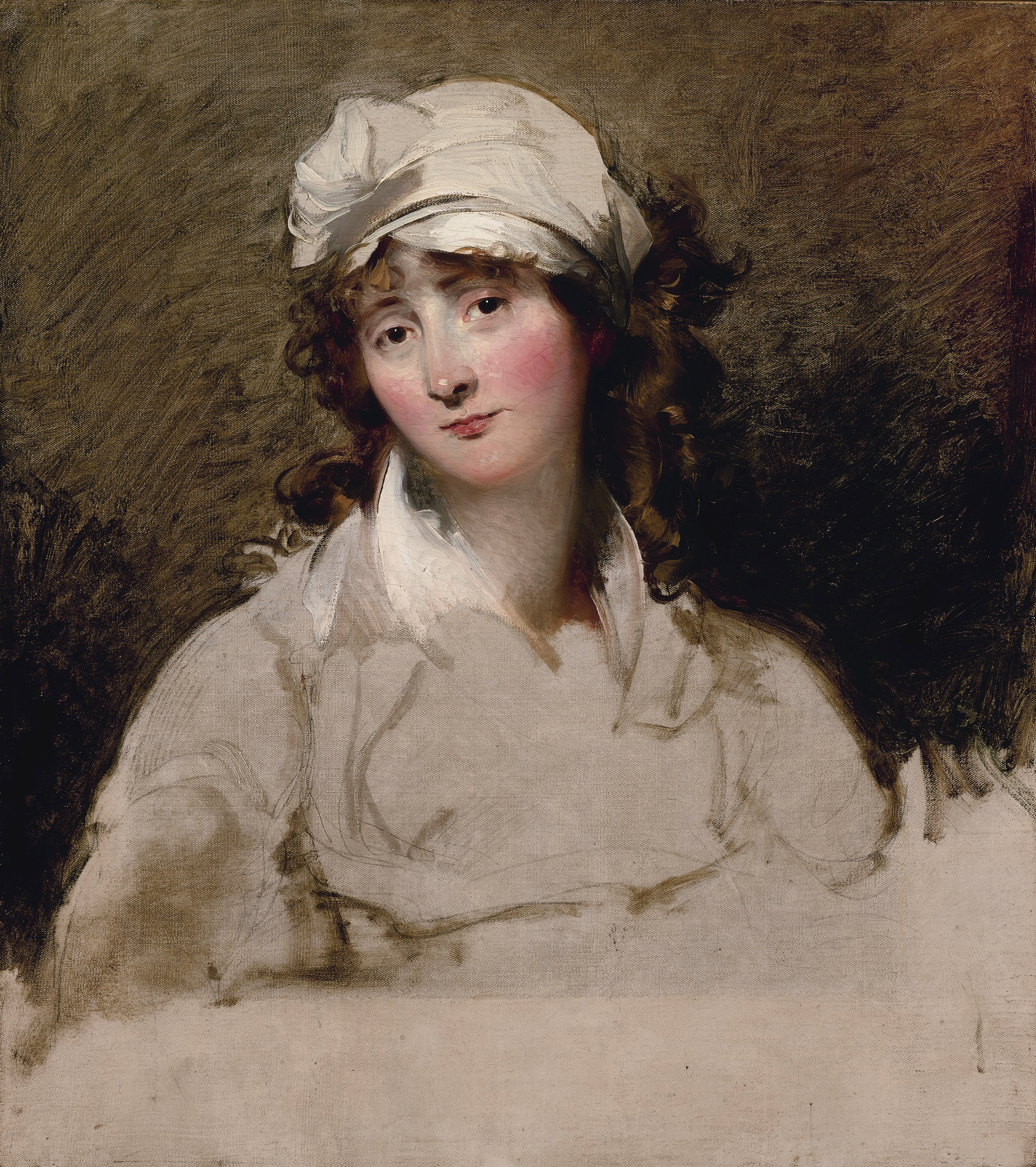
- Written by: Elizabeth Inchbald
- Original language: English
- Genre: Comedy

Premiere
- Date premiered: 15 December 1787
- Place premiered: Theatre Royal, Covent Garden, London

All on a Summer's Day is a 1787 comedy play by the English writer Elizabeth Inchbald. It premiered at the Theatre Royal, Covent Garden in London on 15 December 1787. The original cast included William Thomas Lewis as Wildlove, John Quick as Sir Ralph Mooneye, Francis Aickin as Governor Morton, William Farren as Sir William Carrol, James Fearon as Chrysostom, William Macready as Lord Henley, Ann Brunton Merry as Louisa, Mrs Webb as Mrs Goodly and Henrietta Amelia Leeson as Lady Henrietta.

== Bibliography ==
- Greene, John C. Theatre in Dublin, 1745-1820: A Calendar of Performances, Volume 6. Lexington Books, 2011.
- Nicoll, Allardyce. A History of English Drama 1660–1900: Volume III. Cambridge University Press, 2009.
- Hogan, C.B (ed.) The London Stage, 1660–1800: Volume V. Southern Illinois University Press, 1968.
- Robertson, Ben P. Elizabeth Inchbald's Reputation: A Publishing and Reception History. Routledge, 2015.
