= The Walloons =

1792 play

- Original language: English
- Written by: Richard Cumberland
- Genre: Comedy
- Setting: Plymouth, Devon,

Premiere
- Date: 20 April 1782
- Place: Theatre Royal, Covent Garden, London

The Walloons is a comedy play by the British writer Richard Cumberland. It was first staged at the Theatre Royal, Covent Garden in London in April 1782. The original cast included John Henderson as Father Sullivan, Richard Wroughton as Montgomery, John Quick as Sir Solomon Dangle, Charles Lee Lewes as Davy Dangle, Francis Aickin as Daggerly, Matthew Clarke as Don Vincentio Drclincourt, John Edwin as Pat Carey, James Fearon as Bumboat, James Thompson as Tipple, Sarah Maria Wilson as Kitty Carrington, Ann Pitt as Mrs Partlet, Mrs Webb as Lady Dangle and Elizabeth Satchell as Agnes. The character of Father O'Sullivan was widely believed to be based on Father Thomas Hussey an Irish-born Priest with whom Cumberland conducted secret talks in an attempt to secure a peace agreement between Britain and Spain during the American War of Independence.

== Bibliography ==
- Mudford, William. The Life of Richard Cumberland. Sherwood, Neely & Jones, 1812.
- Nicoll, Allardyce. A History of English Drama 1660-1900. Volume III: Late Eighteenth Century Drama. Cambridge University Press, 1952.
