= John Edwin (1749–1790) =

18th-century English actor

John Edwin (10 August 1749 – 31 October 1790), English actor, was born in London, the son of a watchmaker. He was the long-term companion of the actress Sarah Walmsley who acted under the name Mrs. Edwin.

== Life ==
As a youth, he appeared in the provinces, in minor parts; and at Bath in 1768 he met Sarah Walmsley, a milliner, with whom he had five children. His first London appearance was at the Haymarket in 1776 as Flaw in Samuel Foote's The Cozeners, but when George Colman took over the theatre he was given better parts and became its leading actor. In 1779 he was at Covent Garden, and played there or at the Haymarket until his death.

Ascribed to him are The Last Legacy of John Edwin, 1780; Edwin's Jests and Edwin's Pills to Purge Melancholy.

== Selected roles ==
- Jacob in The Chapter of Accidents by Sophia Lee (1780)
- Bronze in The World as it Goes by Hannah Cowley (1781)
- Timid in Duplicity by Thomas Holcroft (1781)
- Pat Carey in The Walloons by Richard Cumberland (1782)
- Sir Marvel Mushroom in More Ways Than One by Hannah Cowley (1783)
- Don Vincentio in A Bold Stroke for a Husband by Hannah Cowley (1783)
- Nicholas in Fashionable Levities by Leonard MacNally (1785)
- Humphry in Appearance Is Against Them by Elizabeth Inchbald (1785)
- Jerome in The Widow's Vow by Elizabeth Inchbald (1786)
- Gregory in The Campaign by Robert Jephson (1785)
- Caleb in He Would Be a Soldier by Frederick Pilon (1786)
- Sheepface in The Village Lawyer by George Colman the Elder (1787)
- Nicolas in The Midnight Hour by Elizabeth Inchbald (1787)
- Muns in The Prisoner at Large by John O'Keeffe (1788)
- Methlegin in The Toy by John O'Keeffe (1789)
