= The Midnight Hour (play) =

1787 play

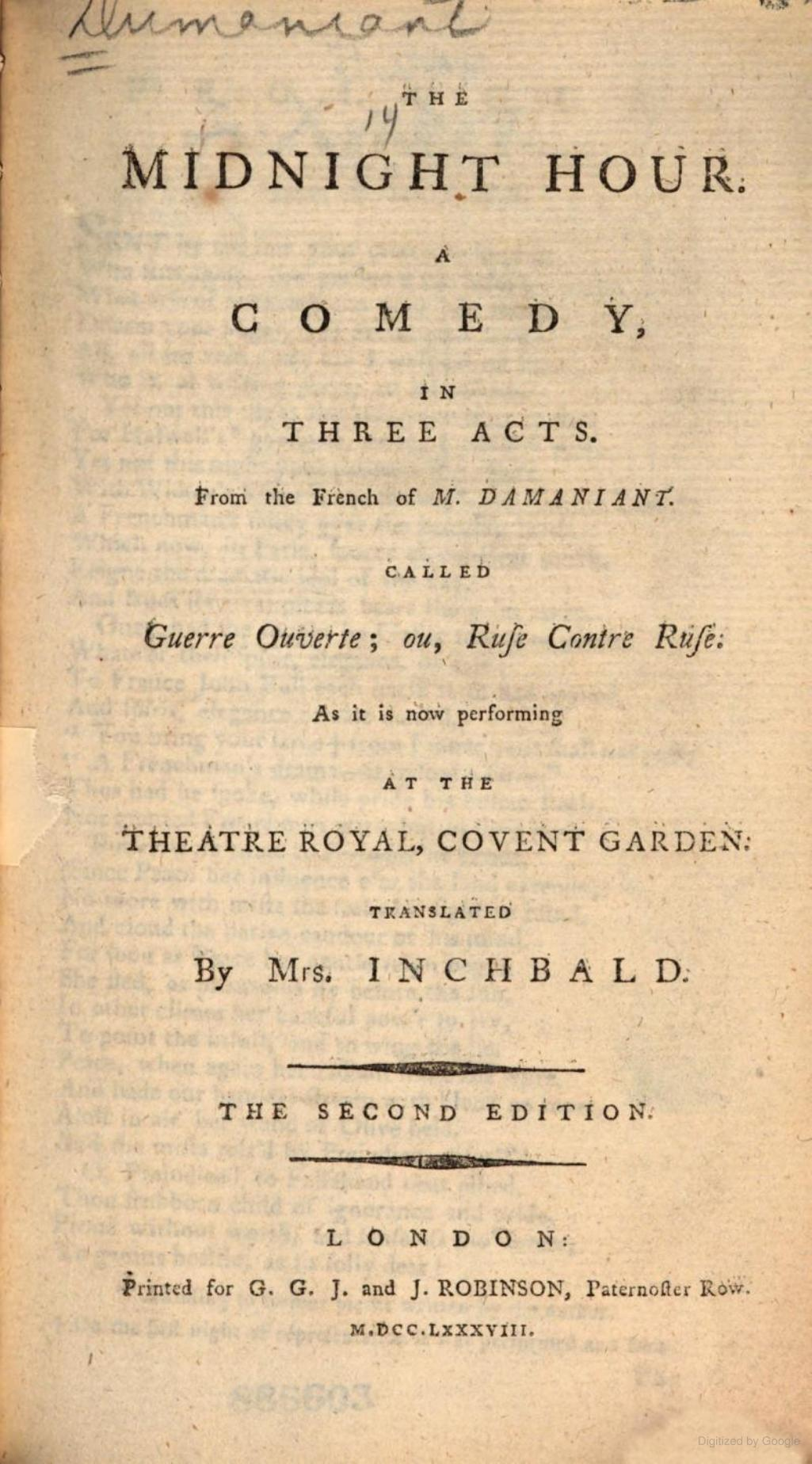
- Original language: English
- Written by: Elizabeth Inchbald
- Genre: Comedy
- Setting: Spain

Premiere
- Date: 22 May 1787
- Place: Theatre Royal, Covent Garden, London

The Midnight Hour is a 1787 comedy play by the British actress and writer Elizabeth Inchbald. A farce, it premiered at the Theatre Royal, Covent Garden in London on 22 May 1787. The original Covent Garden cast included William Thomas Lewis as The Marquis, John Quick as The General, Thomas Ryder as Sebastian, John Edwin as Nicolas, James Fearon as Mathias, James Thompson as Ambrose, Mary Wells as Julia, Lydia Webb as Cecily and Isabella Mattocks as Flora. The Irish premiere took place at the Smock Alley Theatre in Dublin on 17 December 1787.

== Bibliography ==
- Greene, John C. Theatre in Dublin, 1745-1820: A Calendar of Performances, Volume 6. Lexington Books, 2011.
- Nicoll, Allardyce. A History of English Drama 1660–1900: Volume III. Cambridge University Press, 2009.
- Hogan, C.B (ed.) The London Stage, 1660–1800: Volume V. Southern Illinois University Press, 1968.
- Robertson, Ben P. Elizabeth Inchbald's Reputation: A Publishing and Reception History. Routledge, 2015.
- Watson, George. The New Cambridge Bibliography of English Literature: Volume 2, 1660–1800. Cambridge University Press, 1971.
