= More Ways Than One =

1783 play

- Written by: Hannah Cowley
- Original language: English
- Genre: Comedy

Premiere
- Date premiered: 6 December 1783
- Place premiered: Covent Garden Theatre, London

More Ways Than One is a 1783 comedy play by the British writer Hannah Cowley.

The original Covent Garden cast included William Thomas Lewis as Bellair, John Quick as Doctor Freelove, John Edwin as Sir Marvel Mushroom, Ralph Wewitzer as Le Gout, Richard Wilson as Evergreen, James Fearon as David, Richard Wroughton as Carlton, James Thompson as Lawyer's Clerk, Priscilla Kemble as Arabella and Sarah Maria Wilson as Miss Juvenile and Elizabeth Younge as Miss Archer.

== Bibliography ==
- Nicoll, Allardyce. A History of English Drama 1660–1900: Volume III. Cambridge University Press, 2009.
- Hogan, C.B (ed.) The London Stage, 1660–1800: Volume V. Southern Illinois University Press, 1968.
