= William Thomas Lewis =

English stage actor

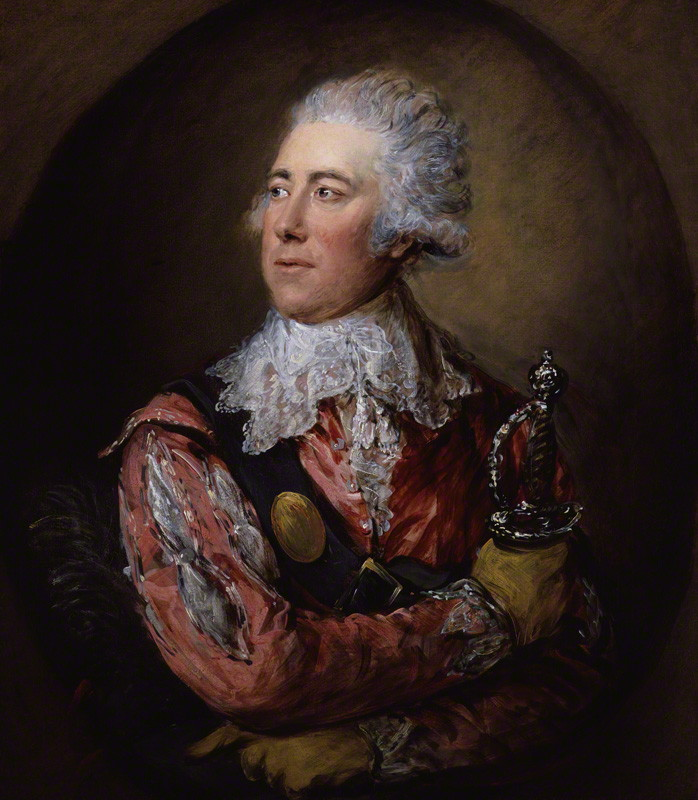
- 1794 portrait by Gainsborough Dupont, in the role of Mercutio
- Born: c.1748 Ormskirk, Lancashire, England
- Died: 13 January 1811; Westbourne Place, London, England

William Thomas Lewis (c.1748–1811), known as "Gentleman" Lewis, due to his refined acting style, was an English actor. Raised in Ireland, he made his name on the Dublin stage before moving to the Theatre Royal, Covent Garden in London where he spent many years. He was said to be "the most complete fop on the stage". In later life he went into theatrical management.

== Early days in Ireland ==
The son of William Lewis, a linendraper on Tower Hill, London, later an actor and manager in Ireland, he was born at Ormskirk, Lancashire, in or about 1748 (there is disagreement about his birth date); he had a Welsh clerical background, and was rumoured to be a great-grandson of Erasmus Lewis. He was brought up in Armagh.

A juvenile actor from very young, Lewis first appeared as "Mr. Lewis" in the playbill when he acted Colonel Briton in Susannah Centlivre's comedy The Wonder. Under Willian Dawson, Lewis appeared (1770–71) at the Capel Street Theatre in Dublin. He rapidly became popular in the city. On 19 February 1771 he was Belcour in The West Indian by Richard Cumberland, a part he made his own. On 4 May 1772, at the Crow Street Theatre. Tate Wilkinson saw him play Romeo to the Juliet of Mrs. Sparks.

== On the London stage ==
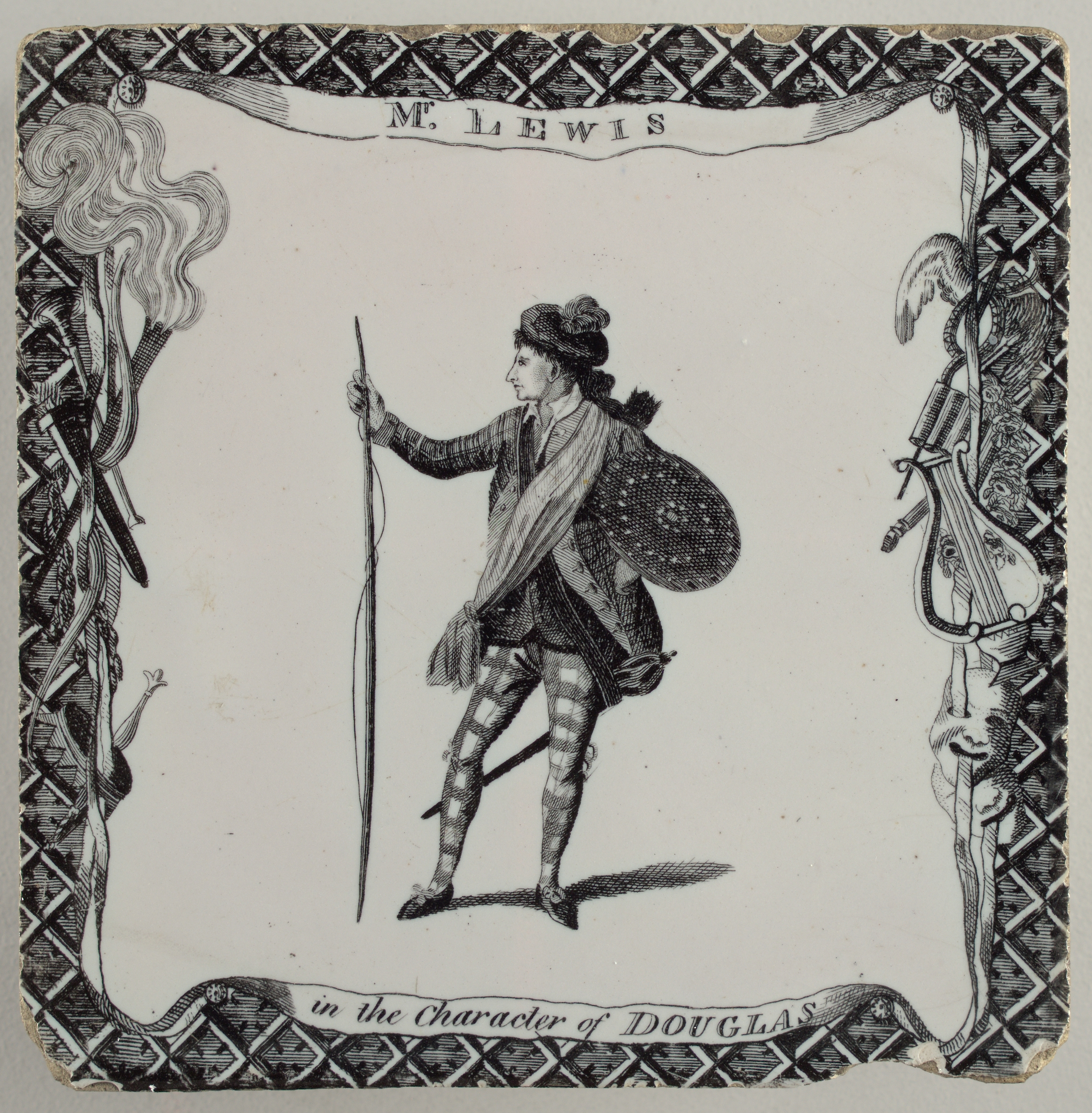
"... in the character of DOUGLAS", c. 1778, transfer-printed tile, after a print.

On 15 October 1773, in his character of Belcour in The West Indian, Lewis made his first appearance at Covent Garden Theatre, where he was well received. He remained there for the rest of his career, with excursions to Liverpool in the summers of 1776 and 1777, to Birmingham in 1779, and to Dublin in 1806. When in 1782 he became deputy-manager of Covent Garden, he practically restricted himself to comic and familiar parts.

== Last years ==
Lewis's farewell to the public took place on 29 May 1809, at the Haymarket Theatre, where the company had moved, after the destruction of Covent Garden by fire. On that occasion he played Roger in The Ghost and the Copper Captain in Rule a Wife and have a Wife. He delivered an address, in which he said that he had been thirty-six years in the service of the public, and could not recall having once fallen under its displeasure. He died on Sunday, 13 January 1811, at his house in Westbourne Place, London.

== Family ==
A member of his first Dublin company, Henrietta Amelia Leeson, who was a pupil of Charles Macklin, subsequently became Lewis's wife. They had three sons and two daughters. One son, Henry Lewis, appeared at Covent Garden, and played a few parts, with little success. He was then on the Dublin stage. He emigrated to Norfolk, Va. in 1815. There he married young actress, Hanna (Ann) Nuskey. That marriage was brief. ref. "The Theatrical Rambles of Mrs. and Mrs. John Green"

On 6 June 1803, in partnership with Thomas Knight, Lewis took a lease on the Liverpool Theatre, which after his death came to his son. Before his death he had, again with Knight, also taken the Manchester Theatre.

== Selected roles ==
- Counsellor Witmore in The Duellist by William Kenrick (1773)
- Pharnaces in Cleonice, Princess of Bithynia by John Hoole (1775)
- Sir Charles Racket in Three Weeks After Marriage by Arthur Murphy (1776)
- Percy in Percy by Hannah More (1777)
- Alfred in Alfred by John Home (1778)
- Millamour in Know Your Own Mind by Arthur Murphy (1779)
- Rivers in The Fatal Falsehood by Hannah More (1779)
- Doricourt in The Belle's Stratagem by Hannah Cowley (1780)
- Sir Charles Danvers in The World as it Goes by Hannah Cowley (1781)
- Theodore in The Count of Narbonne by Robert Jephson (1781)
- Sir Harry Portland in Duplicity by Thomas Holcroft (1781)
- Beauchamp in Which is the Man? by Hannah Cowley (1782)
- Bellair in More Ways Than One by Hannah Cowley (1783)
- Don Julio in A Bold Stroke for a Husband by Hannah Cowley (1783)
- Charles Davenant in The Mysterious Husband by Richard Cumberland (1783)
- Welford in Fashionable Levities by Leonard MacNally (1785)
- Captain Crevelt in He Would Be a Soldier by Frederick Pilon (1786)
- Wildlove in All on a Summer's Day by Elizabeth Inchbald (1787)
- Twineall in Such Things Are by Elizabeth Inchbald (1787)
- The Marquis in The Midnight Hour by Elizabeth Inchbald (1787)
- Count Valantia in The Child of Nature by Elizabeth Inchbald (1788)
- Jack Marmoset in The School for Widows by Richard Cumberland (1789)
- Vapid in The Dramatist by Frederick Reynolds (1789)
- Aircourt in The Toy by John O'Keeffe (1789)
- Count Conolly Villars in The School for Arrogance by Thomas Holcroft (1791)
- Nominal in Notoriety by Frederick Reynolds (1791)
- Rover in Wild Oats by John O'Keeffe (1791)
- Goldfinch in The Road to Ruin by Thomas Holcroft (1792)
- Harry Herbert in Columbus by Thomas Morton (1792)
- Grigsby in The World in a Village by John O'Keeffe (1793)
- Pave in How to Grow Rich by Frederick Reynolds (1793)
- Sir Robert Ramble in Everyone Has His Fault by Elizabeth Inchbald (1793)
- Muscadel in Love's Frailties by Thomas Holcroft (1794)
- Gingham in The Rage by Frederick Reynolds (1794)
- Tippy in The Town Before You by Hannah Cowley (1794)
- Cheveril in The Deserted Daughter by Thomas Holcroft (1795)
- Tanjore in Speculation by Frederick Reynolds (1795)
- Lord Arthur D'Aumerle in Life's Vagaries by John O'Keeffe (1795)
- Ap-Hazard in Fortune's Fool by Frederick Reynolds (1796)
- Tangent in The Way to Get Married by Thomas Morton (1796)
- Young Rapid in A Cure for the Heart Ache by Thomas Morton (1797)
- Rostrum in Secrets Worth Knowing by Thomas Morton (1797)
- Bronzely in Wives as They Were and Maids as They Are by Elizabeth Inchbald (1797)
- Sir George Versatile in He's Much to Blame by Thomas Holcroft (1798)
- Gossamer in Laugh When You Can by Frederick Reynolds (1798)
- Sir Francis Delroy in The Eccentric Lover by Richard Cumberland (1798)
- George Fervid in Five Thousand a Year by Thomas John Dibdin (1799)
- Captain Lavish in Management by Frederick Reynolds (1799)
- Drooply in The Votary of Wealth by Joseph George Holman (1799)
- Claransforth in The Wise Man of the East by Elizabeth Inchbald (1799)
- Sir Harry Torpid in Life by Frederick Reynolds (1800)
- Tom Tock in Folly as it Flies by Frederick Reynolds (1801)
- Frank Liberal The School for Prejudice by Thomas Dibdin (1801)
- Frederick Bramble in The Poor Gentleman by George Colman the Younger (1801)
- Henry Sapling in Delays and Blunders by Frederick Reynolds (1802)
- Honourable Tom Shuffleton in John Bull by George Colman the Younger (1803)
- Sir Andrew Analyse in The Blind Bargain by Frederick Reynolds (1804)
- Harry Harebrain The Will for the Deed by Thomas Dibdin (1804)
- Young Doric in The Delinquent by Frederick Reynolds (1805)
- Sir Larry Mac Murragh in Who Wants a Guinea? by George Colman the Younger (1805)
- Modern in Begone Dull Care by Frederick Reynolds (1808)

== Notes ==
Attribution

This article incorporates text from a publication now in the public domain: Lee, Sidney, ed. (1893). "Lewis, William Thomas". Dictionary of National Biography. Vol. 33. London: Smith, Elder & Co.
