= A Bold Stroke for a Husband =

Play by Hannah Cowley

- Written by: Hannah Cowley
- Original language: English
- Genre: Comedy

Premiere
- Date premiered: 25 February 1783
- Place premiered: Covent Garden Theatre, London

A Bold Stroke for a Husband is a 1783 comedy play by the British writer Hannah Cowley. The title is a variation on Susanna Centlivre's A Bold Stroke for a Wife. The original Covent Garden cast included William Thomas Lewis as Don Julio, Richard Wroughton as Don Carlos, John Quick as Don Caesar, John Edwin as Don Vincentio, Richard Wilson as Gasper, John Whitfield as Don Garcia, James Fearon as Vasquez, Mary Robinson as Victoria, Sarah Maria Wilson as Minette, Mary Whitfield as Laura, Harriet Pitt as Sancha and Isabella Mattocks as Olivia. The epilogue was written by John O'Keeffe. The play is in five acts and is set in Madrid.

== Bibliography ==
- Nicoll, Allardyce. A History of English Drama 1660–1900: Volume III. Cambridge University Press, 2009.
- Hogan, C.B (ed.) The London Stage, 1660–1800: Volume V. Southern Illinois University Press, 1968.
