= Animal Magnetism (play) =

1788 play

- Written by: Elizabeth Inchbald
- Original language: English
- Genre: Comedy
- Setting: England, present day

Premiere
- Date premiered: 22 May 1788
- Place premiered: Theatre Royal, Covent Garden, London

Animal Magnetism is a 1788 comedy play by the English writer Elizabeth Inchbald. A three-act farce, it premiered as an afterpiece at the Theatre Royal, Covent Garden in London on 22 May 1788. The original cast included John Quick as Doctor, William Blanchard as La Fleur, William Macready the Elder as Marquis De Lancey, Mary Wells as Constance and Isabella Mattocks as Lisette. The Irish premiere took place at the Crow Street Theatre in Dublin on 8 November 1788.

== Bibliography ==
- Greene, John C. Theatre in Dublin, 1745-1820: A Calendar of Performances, Volume 6. Lexington Books, 2011.
- Jenkins, Annibel. I'll Tell You What: The Life of Elizabeth Inchbald. University Press of Kentucky, 2021.
- Nicoll, Allardyce. A History of English Drama 1660–1900: Volume III. Cambridge University Press, 2009.
- Hogan, C.B (ed.) The London Stage, 1660–1800: Volume V. Southern Illinois University Press, 1968.
- Robertson, Ben P. Elizabeth Inchbald's Reputation: A Publishing and Reception History. Routledge, 2015.
