= The Campaign (play) =

Comedy play

- Original language: English
- Written by: Robert Jephson
- Genre: Comedy

Premiere
- Date: 1784 (Dublin); 12 May 1785 (London)
- Place: Smock Alley Theatre, Dublin

The Campaign: or, Love in the East Indies is a 1784 comedy play with songs by the Irish writer Robert Jephson.

It premiered at the Smock Alley Theatre in Dublin in 1784, before transferring to Covent Garden where it first appeared in May 1785. The original London cast included John Quick as General Howitzer, John Edwin as Gregory, John Henry Johnstone as Captain Farquhar, Ralph Wewitzer as Squad, William Cubitt as Ensign Flag, Margaret Kennedy as Saib, Sarah Maria Wilson as Susan and Elizabeth Bannister as Miss Lucy Seymour.

In 1787 John O'Keeffe adapted the work into a two-act afterpiece Love and War.

== Bibliography ==
- Nicoll, Allardyce. A History of English Drama 1660–1900: Volume III. Cambridge University Press, 2009.
- Hogan, C.B (ed.) The London Stage, 1660–1800: Volume V. Southern Illinois University Press, 1968.
- O'Shaughnessy, David. Ireland, Enlightenment and the English Stage, 1740-1820. Cambridge University Press, 2019.
