= The Duellist =

Play by William Kenrick

- Original language: English
- Written by: William Kenrick
- Genre: Comedy
- Setting: London, present day

Premiere
- Date: 20 November 1773
- Place: Theatre Royal, Covent Garden, London

The Duellist is a 1773 comedy play by the British writer William Kenrick. It premiered at the Theatre Royal, Covent Garden on 20 November 1773. The original Covent Garden cast included Henry Woodward as General Gantlet, William 'Gentleman' Smith as Captain Boothby, Edward Shuter as Sir Solomon Bauble, John Quick as Serjant Nonplus, William Thomas Lewis as Counsellor Witmore, Richard Wroughton as Lord Lovemore, John Cushing as Mactotum and Jane Green as Lady Bauble.

== Bibliography ==
- Nicoll, Allardyce. A History of English Drama 1660–1900: Volume III. Cambridge University Press, 2009.
- Hogan, C.B (ed.) The London Stage, 1660–1800: Volume V. Southern Illinois University Press, 1968.
