= James Fearon (actor) =

British actor

James Fearon (1746–1789) was a British stage actor.

From 1768 to 1771 he acted in Edinburgh and Glasgow, before making his London debut at Haymarket Theatre. He appeared in London until his death, mainly at the Covent Garden Theatre, whose company he joined in 1774.

== Selected roles ==
- Peter Poultice in The Maid of Bath by Samuel Foote (1771)
- Coachman in The Rivals by Richard Brinsley Sheridan (1775)
- Sir John Millamour in Know Your Own Mind by Arthur Murphy (1777)
- Porter in The Belle's Stratagem by Hannah Cowley (1780)
- Officer in The Count of Narbonne by Robert Jephson (1781)
- Bumboat in The Walloons by Richard Cumberland (1782)
- David in More Ways Than One by Hannah Cowley (1783)
- Vasquez in A Bold Stroke for a Husband by Hannah Cowley (1783)
- Leuthrop in Werter by Frederick Reynolds (1786)
- Wilkins in He Would Be a Soldier by Frederick Pilon (1786)
- Mathias in The Midnight Hour by Elizabeth Inchbald (1787)
- Chrysostom in All on a Summer's Day by Elizabeth Inchbald (1787)
- Zedan in Such Things Are by Elizabeth Inchbald (1787)
- Truffly in The Ton by Eglantine Wallace (1788)
- Seville in The Child of Nature by Elizabeth Inchbald (1788)

== Bibliography ==
- Cox, Jeffrey N. & Gamer, Michael. The Broadview Anthology of Romantic Drama. Broadview Press, 2003.
- Highfill, Philip H, Burnim, Kalman A. & Langhans, Edward A. A Biographical Dictionary of Actors, Actresses, Musicians, Dancers, Managers, and Other Stage Personnel in London, 1660-1800. SIU Press, 1973.
