= The Eccentric Lover =

1798 play

- Original language: English
- Written by: Richard Cumberland
- Genre: Comedy

Premiere
- Date: 30 May 1798
- Place: Covent Garden Theatre, London

The Eccentric Lover is a comedy play by the British writer Richard Cumberland. It was first performed at Covent Garden Theatre on 30 April 1798. The original cast included William Thomas Lewis as Sir Francis Delroy, John Quick as Peter Crowfoot, Joseph George Holman as Fenton, Joseph Shepherd Munden as Admiral Delroy, John Fawcett as Doctor Crisis, Charles Murray as Gangrene, John Whitfield as Sir Henry Netterville, Julia Betterton as Eleanor de Ferrars, Jane Pope as Constantia and Isabella Mattocks as Fidelia.

== Plot ==
Sir Frances finds out that he is in love with Eleanor and decided to marry her after several unfortunate dates Eleanor accept his proposal.

== Bibliography ==
- Hogan, C.B (ed.) The London Stage, 1660–1800: Volume V. Southern Illinois University Press, 1968.
- Mudford, William. The Life of Richard Cumberland. Sherwood, Neely & Jones, 1812.
- Watson, George. The New Cambridge Bibliography of English Literature: Volume 2, 1660–1800. Cambridge University Press, 1971.
