= The Way to Get Married =

1796 play

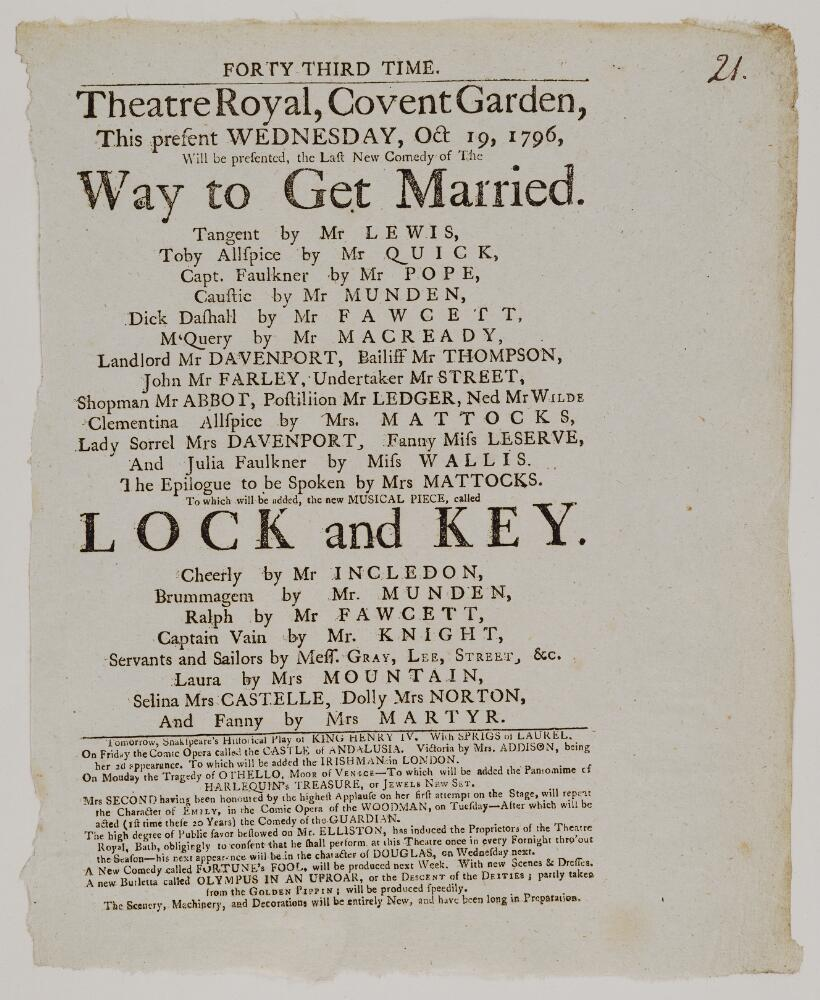
- Original language: English
- Written by: Thomas Morton
- Genre: Comedy

Premiere
- Date: 23 January 1796
- Place: Covent Garden Theatre, London

The Way to Get Married is a 1796 comedy play by the British writer Thomas Morton. The play was frequently revived well into the nineteenth century.

The original cast included William Thomas Lewis as Tangent, John Quick as Toby Allspice, John Henry Johnstone as McQuery, Alexander Pope as Captain Faulkener, Joseph Shepherd Munden as Caustic, John Fawcett as Dick Dashall, Charles Farley as Servant, Charles Holland as Solicitor, Isabella Mattocks as Clementina Allspice, Tryphosa Jane Wallis as Julia Faulkener and Mary Ann Davenport as Lady Sorel.

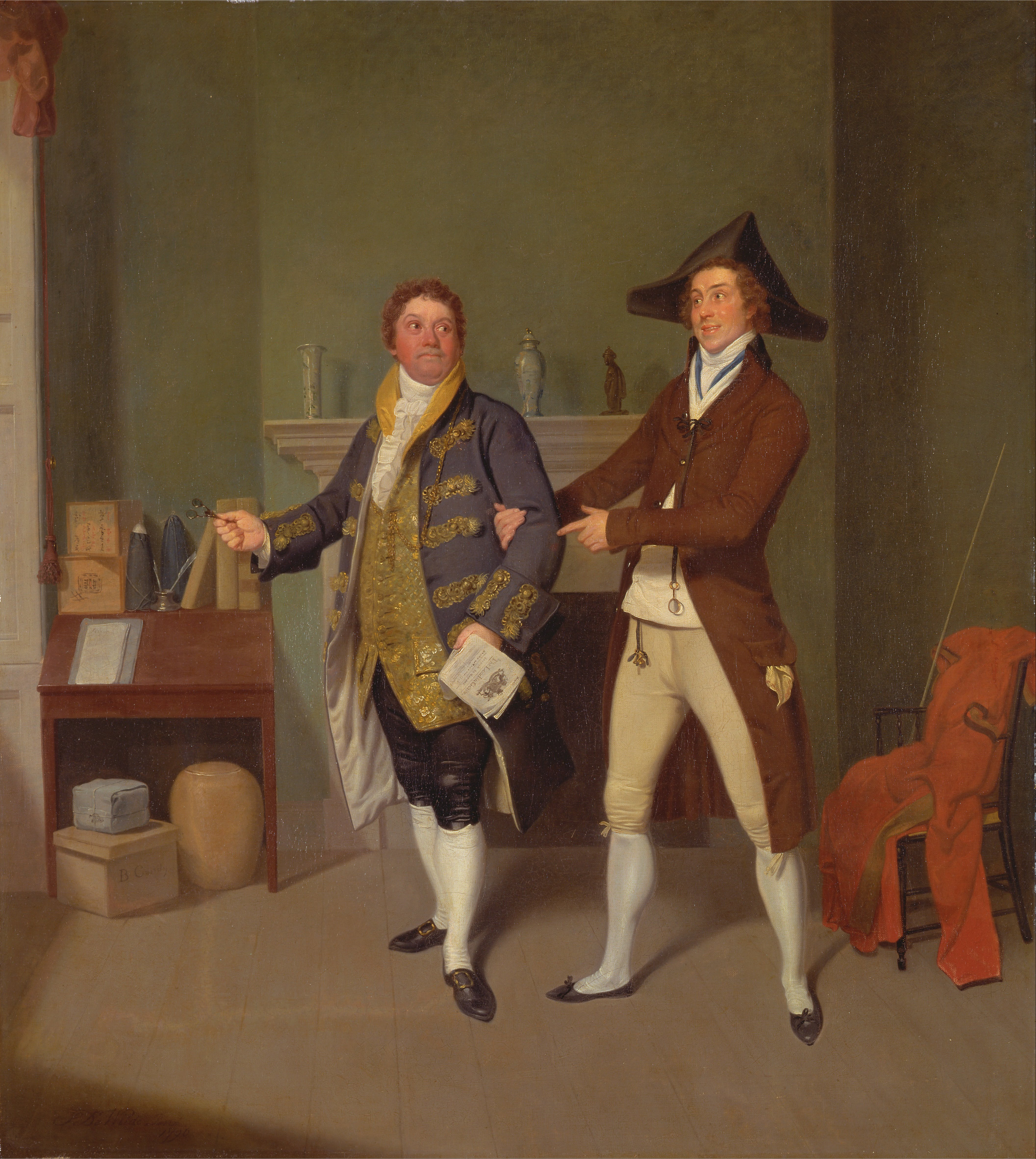
John Quick and John Fawcett in The Way to Get Married.

== Bibliography ==
- Nicoll, Allardyce. A History of English Drama 1660–1900: Volume III. Cambridge University Press, 2009.
- Hogan, C.B (ed.) The London Stage, 1660–1800: Volume V. Southern Illinois University Press, 1968.
