= Nature and Art =

1796 novel by Elizabeth Inchbald

Nature and Art is the second novel written by English actress, playwright, and novelist Elizabeth Inchbald. First published in 1796, Inchbald's two-volume novel considers the influence of education, social conventions, gender conditioning, and privilege on human behavior.

Nature and Art is a satirical fable published in 1796, which is told in the third person narrative. It consists of forty seven chapters, each one is between two and five pages long. It tells the story of two successive generations, and the corrupting effects of the social system in place at the time. It is quite a blunt, rather than subtle, attack on the societal structure, along with a critical reflection on a woman's place in society at that time. Throughout the story Elizabeth Inchbald analyses the effect of education, power and privileges has on human behaviour.

Some characters are brothers William and Henry Norwynne, as well as their sons, also named William and Henry.

Considered a Jacobin novel, Nature and Art traces the connections between the character's personal experiences and larger structures of institutional oppression. Notably, Nature and Art is an early example of a Romantic era novel with a title of paired opposites, like to the later novel Sense and Sensibility (1811) by Jane Austen.

== Plot ==
The story begins with two brothers William (Elder) and Henry, as they leave their native town and travel to London, following the death of their father, a country shopkeeper. Both brothers are under twenty years old, and hope to acquire a living in London. It would appear they are not financially secure as 'through death, their father escaped his creditors'. As they travel Henry weeps, while William does his best to suppress tears. They arrive in London and soon find every attempt to secure employment is met with obstacles. However, there is one thing Henry can do, which is to play the fiddle. Once this becomes known, Henry is invited into company that enables his advancement. He is overjoyed, but also unable to fully enjoy his situation while his brother has not secured a living. Henry offers to teach William to play the violin, but his offer is vehemently refused by his brother. They both agree that he William is much more adept to learning academia than music, so Henry suggests William should go to one of the universities to study.

William manages to attend university with the help and support of Henry, who has sustained a good living through his violin playing. Henry continues to mix with those in wealthy upper-class circles, and through enjoyment of his playing by one man, he manages to secure a living of five hundred pounds for his brother on the man's death. William succeeds in his studies, obtaining the orders of dean and priest. By now the wealthy man has died and William wastes no time returning to take possession of this good fortune. On seeing his brother dressed up in his orders attire, Henry cries tears of pride and joy. However, being the elder, a man of literature, William feels contempt at being obliged to a younger illiterate sibling, and is unable to show gratitude towards Henry. This also makes William feel contempt for his own ingratitude. As Henry's fame and position increases, William seeks advancement within the church. Once he secures position of dean, William begins to insult Henry for his 'useless occupation', highlighting the shame it brings on him in his position of dean. No longer feeling worthy of his brother's company, Henry decides to marry in the hope of finding a companion and friend better suited to his own position.

Henry does find a wife, when William hears and discovers she is a singer, they argue. William refuses to accept Henry's wife, or introduce her to his own wife Lady Clementina. The brothers are estranged for over a year, when William hears of the death of Henry's wife. Unsure of how he should conduct himself, William seeks the advice of his wife, who informs him, with Henry being the inferior, it should be Henry alone to be the first to seek reconciliation. At first William agrees, however constant exposure to Lady Clementina's vanity and selfishness, causes him to reflect on his previous behaviour, and he proceeds to seek Henry out. He finds that Henry has in fact left England for Africa, with his son, following the death of his wife. Time passes, and William and his wife have a child, a boy also named William, who is doted on by his father and educated in the manner equal to his high position in society.

When William Jnr reaches the age of thirteen, a sailor arrives at their home, along with a young boy. A letter is handed to William Snr, from his brother Henry. In the letter Henry explains how after a fall he was unable to play or entertain, which resulted in him losing most of his friends. Through feelings of shame, he was unable to seek out his brother, and decided to travel, hoping to secure a fortune again. Instead, the natives of the island they travelled to, after hearing him play the violin, have held him and his son, also named Henry, captive for years. His hand has again become weak, fearful he may not be able to play for much longer, which could put his son in danger, he has managed, with help, to secure safe passage to England for the boy. He asks William for forgiveness, requesting that William let the boy live with him, and to blame any ignorance they find the boy has on his teachings. William Snr reaction to the boy is a show of instant affection and acceptance. At first his wife behaves rather aloofly, until she considers how the public will respond. She decides to treat Henry Jnr as her own son, for it will excite her friends and she will be viewed as heroic, making her enemies jealous. For William Jnr, he is not jealous of Henry, instead he looks forward to his new cousin being surprised and in awe of William Jnr's superiority. While for Henry, he at first takes William Snr to be a little man, given his attitude and demeanour, until he is convince William Jnr and himself are of similar age.

Living with his uncle, Henry learns to read and is exposed to the social norms. He is inquisitive, his questioning highlights the contradictions with the society he find himself. At first he holds a contempt for finery, until the high value of Lady Clementina's Jewels is explained to him. He comes to respect a pair of earrings as much as Lady Clementina. Later, when his uncle is angered by the coachman, and dismisses him, Henry questioned why this would be punishment, for the man has had to wait for hours in the cold and rain. His uncle explains how in society the poor are born to serve the rich, if they decide not to serve, they will starve. Those that do serve will be rewarded in the world after death, where everyone is equal. Henry questions why this world cannot be as good, his uncle answered that 'god has made it so'. Henry also confuses words and their correct meaning, such as compliments for lies, reserve for pride and war or battle for massacre, which irritate his new family. However they put it down to his lack of education and disposition.

The relationship between William Snr and Lady Clementina is one in which she does and dresses as she pleases, without comment or control from her husband, giving the impression in public of a perfect union, but it is this way, as her husband cares nothing for her. The boys grow, William Jnr inherits all his father's pride and ambition, while Henry all his father's humility. Yet Henry believes he has more pride than William Jnr as he will never be able to stoop or act contrary to his feelings, while his cousin gives up his opinion in the face of anyone superior, regardless if they are right. For William Jnr, Henry will never become a great man because of it. There attitudes to the opposite sex are also different, William Jnr is extremely attentive, while Henry admires and feel affection for them from a distance.

When the boys are twenty, William Snr purchases a small estate in a village, near Lord and Lady Bendham. William Jnr becomes attracted to a local girl Agnes, wanting her to become his mistress, while Henry feels a tender regard for the daughter of the village curate Rebecca. William Jnr admires Agnes's beauty, enjoys her company, and they meet in secret. Within a few weeks Agnes has fallen in love with William, admiring his superiority, while William declares his love, he constantly attempts to seduce Agnes into having sex with him, claiming it would prove her true feelings of love for him. Throughout their affair William makes no promises of marriage, or security, however, Agnes eventually gives into Williams seduction. When he leaves at the end of the summer, Agnes falls into a depression, from his cold farewell and guilt from losing her virtue. For Rebecca, she is amazed at first by the attention given to her by Henry. Considered the less attractive of four older sisters she is not used to it. Henry is moved by her quiet unassuming personality, and they begin spending time together, when Henry leaves, Rebecca feels sorrow. Through separation Henry's love for Rebecca increases, while Williams passion for Agnes declines.

William later receives a proposal from his father of marriage to a dependent niece of Lady Bendham, Miss Sedgeley. At first William is disgusted by the prospect, however, once his father explains the great connections and patronage the union will bring, William becomes more interested and eager for the proposal. Determined to force away any remaining affections for Agnes, instead he looks down on her weakness in scorn. Miss Sedgeley's reacts to the proposal of marriage in a similar manner, that it will be an ‘unpleasant home'. Given her position she has no other option but to agree to the union. However, she resolves to ‘make a bad wife, not caring a pin for her husband, and will dress and visit as she pleases. The marriage is kept a secret and the families return to the village the following summer. Henry and Rebecca both experience joy at their reunion, while William and Agnes, are uneasy in on another's company. Agnes's tears and sobs instead of caresses annoy William and he storms off, promising never to see her again. Still Agnes hopes after reflection he will turn up the following night, and she waits, but he does not appear. She writes to him, pleading to see him one more time, to which he response sharply he will keep his word of never seeing her again.

A month passes, one morning Henry is walking through the woods, when he hears a groan, through the mist he sees the figure of a female, who runs away. He spots a new born baby boy left on the ground, covering the baby, decides to bring it to Rebecca. While walking he notices a cord around the baby's neck, realising that the parent had considered killing the baby, before leaving it in the wood. Explaining to Rebecca how he found the baby, they decide to hide it at Rebecca's, so it will not be taken, or the mother prosecuted. The mother of the child is Agnes, believing the baby to be dead, by her hand, she is tormented. Rebecca manages to hide the baby for weeks, until her father and sisters find out. They assume the child is Rebecca's, and regardless of her denials threaten to throw her out, unless she confesses who the father is. After much interrogation and threats, Rebecca reluctantly names Henry as the father. Rebecca's father immediately leaves for William Snr house, where he relays the news of Henry's sinful conduct, to William Snr. He is astonished at the news and calls for William, who reacts in the same horrified manner, forgetting his own seduction of Agnes. They call for Henry, who immediately denies Rebecca is the mother, declaring her virtuous, and proceeds to tell the truth of finding the baby. Rebecca is brought to the house, admits to declaring herself mother and Henry father to the baby. She is made to swear of the admission on the bible. Henry, not wanting Rebecca to confess a lie, stops them, asking to marry Rebecca. It is seen by William Snr as an admission of guilt, as punishment for the seduction then lying about it, Henry is banished from his uncle's house.

The wedding between William Jnr and Miss Sedgeley goes ahead as planned. Agnes still believing she has murdered her baby, and tormented by her lost love, decides to end her life, and returns to the wood. Just as she is about to go through with it, Henry appears. She finds out her baby is still alive, admits to Henry the baby is hers and Williams Jnr. She agrees to clear Rebecca's name and is brought before William Snr and others. Here she admits she is the true mother, but refuses to name of the father. Threatened with court where she would likely be made to declare the father, she requests to talk to William Snr in private. He agrees after she explains it involves his family, then in private she admits his son is the father. William Snr gives Agnes the choice of giving up the baby, which will be taken care of, in exchange she may be taken care of, alternatively if she insists on keeping the child, she can expect no help. Agnes decides to keep the child. She returns to her parents’ house, but the reaction of others and the shame brought on her family, she leaves. Henry tries to get William to help Agnes financially, but he refuses. Now that Rebecca and Henry's innocence has been proven, William Snr forbids Henry to marry Rebecca, he is also refused entry to Rebecca's father's house at insistence of his uncle. As he is of age Henry decides to look for his father, to find out what has happened to him. He secures passage and informs his uncle of his decision. He is given money to help him on his way, but his uncle does not expect he will be looking for further financial aid. Before leaving Henry writes to Rebecca declaring his love, and that he will return for her one day.

Agnes tries to find work to support herself and child but is turned away by most. She manages to secure work on a farm, but the work is hard. Years passed and her boy grows, reminding her at times of his father, one difference is that the boy loves his mother, and is extremely attached to her. Her employer dies, and Agnes once again finds herself looking for work. Unable to secure anything she ends up travelling to London, where she eventually secures a position as servant in kitchen. Unfortunately, her mistress pays her only half the wages she should, She is also continually dissatisfied, that the workers live under a constant fear of dismissal. Eventually Agnes find herself unemployed again. She works in various places, unable to secure a more permanent position, and ends up working in a brothel. Later she finds herself working the streets, and falls in with a criminal gang, getting involved in forged bills. She is caught, arrested and brought to jail awaiting trial. In the meanwhile, William Snr has advanced his position to bishop, and William Jnr has become a judge. However William Jnr's riches do not equate to happiness, he is in a loveless marriage, and has no children.

Agnes find herself in court with William Jnr as her judge, he fails to recognise the girl he previous seduced. He finds her guilty and sentences her to death. Days after her execution, William Jnr comes across an article in the paper about Agnes, with details of her dying words. In this she explains the circumstances of her downfall, and is accepting of her judgement. The article also tells how Agnes, the condemned woman, wrote to the judge who had given the death sentence, requesting his protection of her son. William realises the women is Agnes and that the boy is his son. He sends for the boy to be brought to him, but finds out that boy, sick and pinning for his mother since her execution, has died.

Nineteen years pass, when Henry Snr and Henry Jnr finally arrive back in England, after a difficult journey, fraught with delays through shipwreck, imprisonment and illness. Henry Jnr is fearful whether his love Rebecca is alive or not, while his father's hoping that his brother William Snr, will receive them with kindness, and not with a reserved manner. They travel to an inn a few miles from William Snr's palace, to await a response from a letter they had sent previous. There is no reply, leaving Henry Snr sad, thinking that his brother means to renounce them. Henry persuades his father to travel to the village, where he is hoping Rebecca still lives. Leaving the inn, they pass by the huge palace of William Snr, and Henry Snr is in owe at the splendour of it all. They hear the funeral bell toll from the church, on approaching the funeral, realise it is William Snr who is dead. There seems to be no sorrow at the passing of the bishop, local refer to him as a mean man, who never done anything for the poor. They discover Lady Clementina is dead four years, from catching a cold while wearing skimpy fashionable dress. That William Jnr has no children, and his wife had an affair, breaking up the marriage and is now married to that man. Henry Snr feels that his brother (the bishop), and his family have not conducted themselves very well. They leave without visiting William Jnr.

When they arrive in the village, Henry Jnr notices changes, with some new houses, while old ones are in ruins. In the churchyard they find Rebecca's father's grave. It is there they meet Rebecca's oldest sister, and discover they still live in the village, in a small cottage. On finally seeing Rebecca, Henry sees she is still the same, and has the same mind, and his affections for Rebecca have not changed. They hear of Agnes's downfall, along with William Jnr's remorse and guilt. Henry and Rebecca marry, with his father they live in small home bordering the sea. There days are complete with fishing and living happily. While lamenting one night, Henry Jnr tells how he used to consider poverty a curse, however after associating with the rich and mixing with the poor, he has undergone a complete change of mind. They now enjoy more pleasure than rich.
