= Know Your Own Mind =

1777 play

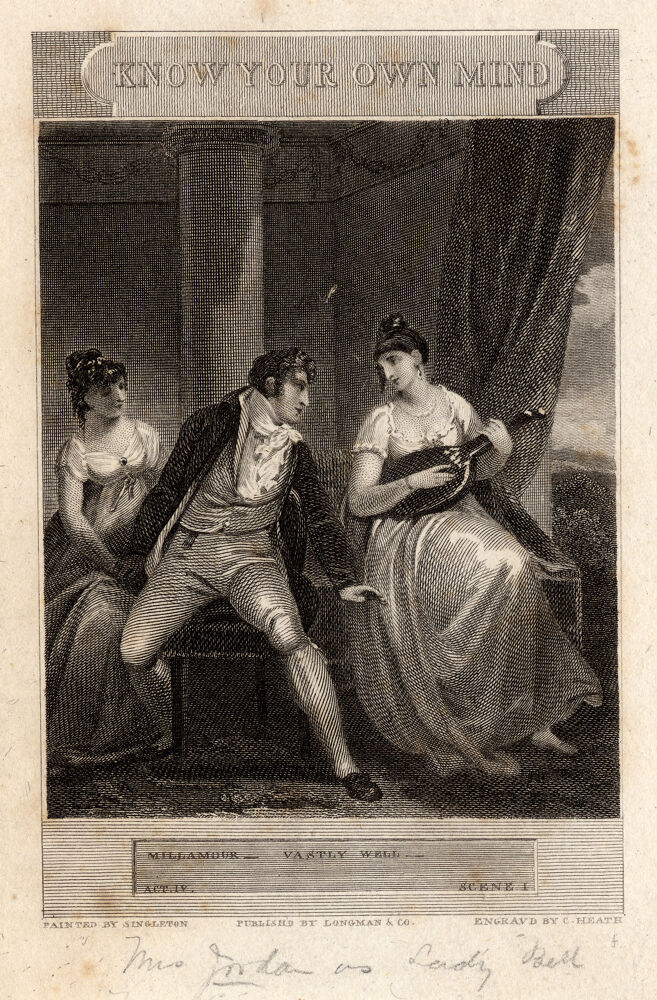
- Original language: English
- Written by: Arthur Murphy
- Genre: Comedy

Premiere
- Date: 22 February 1777
- Place: Theatre Royal, Covent Garden, London

Know Your Own Mind is a 1777 comedy play by the Irish writer Arthur Murphy. It premiered at the Theatre Royal, Covent Garden on 22 February 1777. The original Covent Garden cast included William Thomas Lewis as Millamour, Charles Lee Lewes as Dashwould, Richard Wroughton as Malvil, Francis Aickin as Bygrove, Cockran Joseph Booth as Captain Bygrave, James Fearon as Sir John Millamour, John Whitfield as Sir Harry Lovewith, Ralph Wewitzer as Charles, Servant of Millamour, Isabella Mattocks as Lady Bell, Mary Dayes as Lady Jane and Elizabeth Hartley as Miss Neville. The Irish premiere was at the Crow Street Theatre in Dublin on 13 August 1778. It was acted nineteen times at Covent Garden and in 1789 was revived at Drury Lane, with Dorothea Jordan in the cast, and remained a standard work well into the nineteenth century.

== Bibliography ==
- Emery, John Pike. Arthur Murphy: An Eminent English Dramatist of the Eighteenth Century. University of Pennsylvania Press, 1946.
- Greene, John C. Theatre in Dublin, 1745–1820: A Calendar of Performances, Volume 6. Lexington Books, 2011.
- Nicoll, Allardyce. A History of English Drama 1660–1900: Volume III. Cambridge University Press, 2009.
- Hogan, C.B (ed.) The London Stage, 1660–1800: Volume V. Southern Illinois University Press, 1968.
