= The Widow's Vow =

1786 play

- Original language: English
- Written by: Elizabeth Inchbald
- Genre: Comedy
- Setting: Spain

Premiere
- Date: 20 June 1786
- Place: Theatre Royal, Haymarket, London

The Widow's Vow is a 1786 comedy play by the English writer Elizabeth Inchbald. A farce, it premiered as an afterpiece at the Theatre Royal, Haymarket on 20 June 1786. The original cast included William Parsons as Don Antonio, John Bannister as Marquis, Robert Palmer as Carlos, John Edwin as Jerome and Mary Wells as Flora. The playwright Thomas Holcroft wrote the prologue.

== Bibliography ==
- Greene, John C. Theatre in Dublin, 1745-1820: A Calendar of Performances, Volume 6. Lexington Books, 2011.
- Jenkins, Annibel. I'll Tell You What: The Life of Elizabeth Inchbald. University Press of Kentucky, 2021.
- Nicoll, Allardyce. A History of English Drama 1660–1900: Volume III. Cambridge University Press, 2009.
- Hogan, C.B (ed.) The London Stage, 1660–1800: Volume V. Southern Illinois University Press, 1968.
- Robertson, Ben P. Elizabeth Inchbald's Reputation: A Publishing and Reception History. Routledge, 2015.
