= The Child of Nature =

1788 play

- Original language: English
- Written by: Elizabeth Inchbald
- Genre: Comedy
- Setting: Spain

Premiere
- Date: 28 November 1788
- Place: Theatre Royal, Covent Garden, London

The Child of Nature is a 1788 comedy play by the English writer Elizabeth Inchbald, adapted from a French work by the Countess de Genlis. It premiered at the Theatre Royal, Covent Garden in London on 28 November 1788. The original cast included Thomas Ryder as Duke Murcia, William Farren as Marquis Almanza, William Thomas Lewis as Count Valantia, James Fearon as Seville, William Macready the Elder as Granada, Francis Aickin as Peasant, Isabella Mattocks as Marchioness Mérida and Ann Brunton Merry as Amanthis. The Dublin premiere took place at the Crow Street Theatre on 13 February 1789.

== Bibliography ==
- Greene, John C. Theatre in Dublin, 1745-1820: A Calendar of Performances, Volume 6. Lexington Books, 2011.
- Nicoll, Allardyce. A History of English Drama 1660–1900: Volume III. Cambridge University Press, 2009.
- Hogan, C.B (ed.) The London Stage, 1660–1800: Volume V. Southern Illinois University Press, 1968.
- Robertson, Ben P. Elizabeth Inchbald's Reputation: A Publishing and Reception History. Routledge, 2015.
