= Three Weeks After Marriage =

1776 play

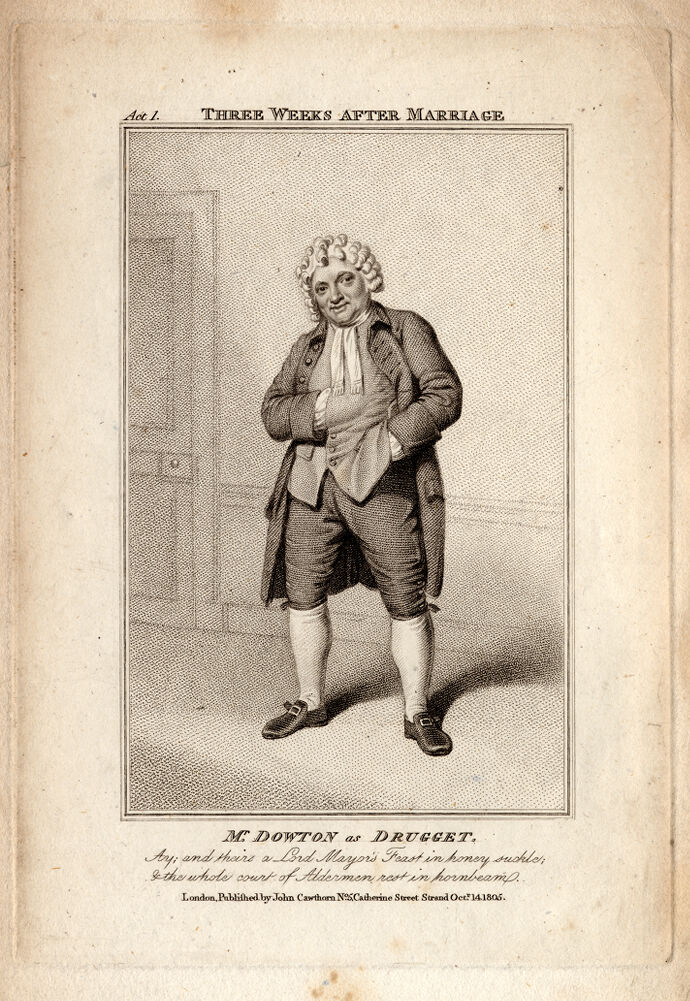
- William Dowton as Drugget
- Original language: English
- Written by: Arthur Murphy
- Genre: Comedy
- Setting: Country house, just outside London

Premiere
- Date: 30 March 1776
- Place: Theatre Royal, Covent Garden, London

Three Weeks after Marriage is a comedy play by the Irish writer Arthur Murphy. An afterpiece, it premiered at the Theatre Royal, Covent Garden in London on 30 March 1776. It was a reworking of an earlier play What We Must All Come To which was staged in 1764, which had a poor reception. The cast included William Thomas Lewis as Sir Charles Racket, John Quick as Drugget, Isabella Mattocks as Lady Racket, Ann Pitt as Mrs Drugget and Jane Green as Dimity. The entire play takes place at a country house about four miles outside London.

It was met "with great applause" and became a standard work, being played every year for the remainder of the century. Its performances continued well into the nineteenth century. The role of Lady Racket later became a signature for Frances Abington, and was also played by Dorothea Jordan and Harriet Faucit.

== Bibliography ==
- Emery, John Pike. Arthur Murphy: An Eminent English Dramatist of the Eighteenth Century. University of Pennsylvania Press, 1946.
- Nicoll, Allardyce. A History of English Drama 1660–1900: Volume III. Cambridge University Press, 2009.
- Hogan, C.B (ed.) The London Stage, 1660–1800: Volume V. Southern Illinois University Press, 1968.
- Taylor, George (ed.) Plays by Samuel Foote and Arthur Murphy: The Minor, The Nabob, The Citizen, Three Weeks After Marriage, Know Your Own Mind. CUP Archive, 1984.
