= A Simple Story (novel) =

1791 novel by Elizabeth Inchbald

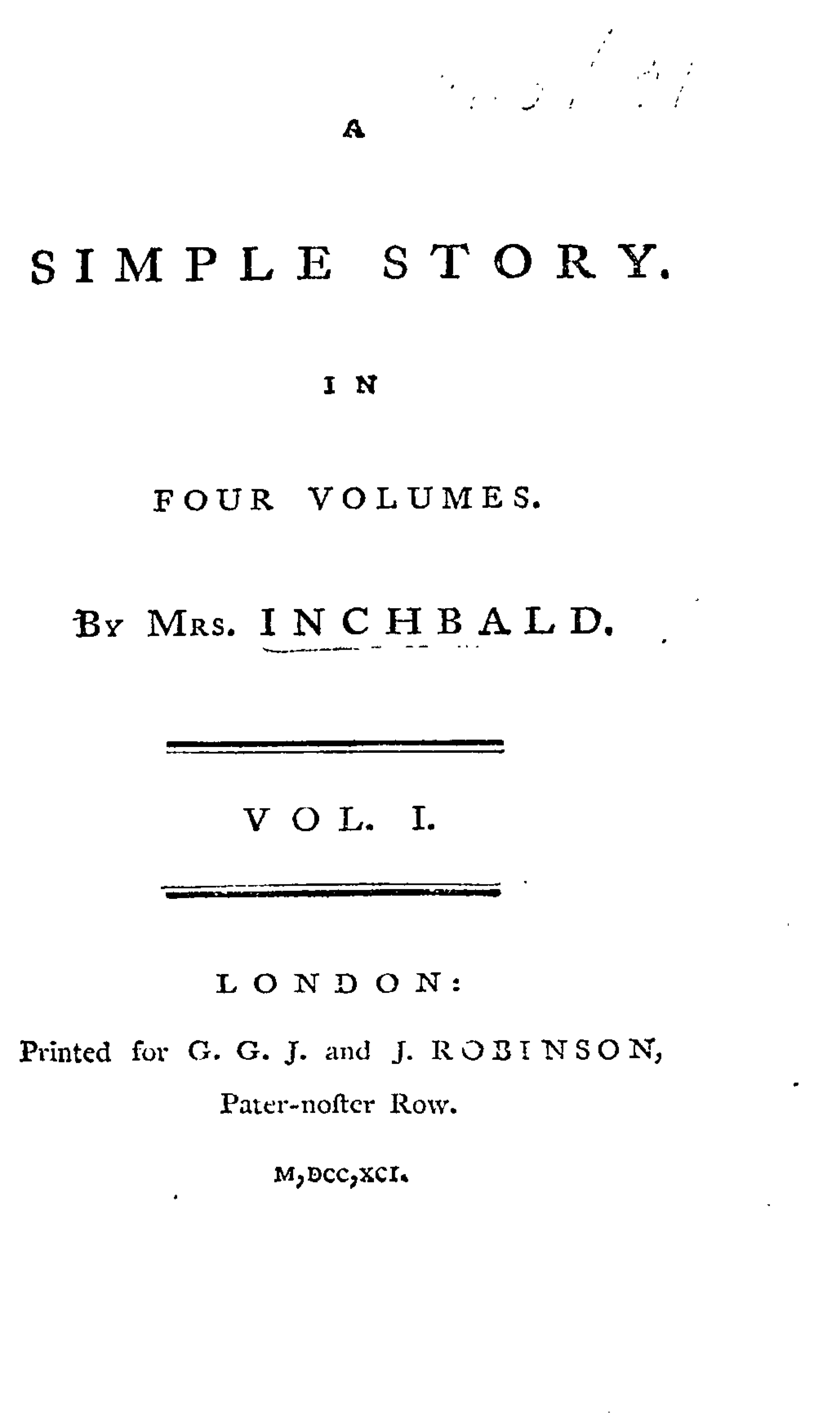
- Title page of Volume I of the first edition.
- Author: Elizabeth Inchbald
- Published: 15 February 1791

A Simple Story is a novel by English author and actress Elizabeth Inchbald. Published in February 1791 as an early example of a "novel of passion", it was successful and became widely read in England and abroad. It went into a second edition in March 1791, and is still in print today.

The story is told in two parts. The first relates the ill-advised romance between a flighty young heiress, Miss Milner, and her guardian Dorriforth. The second follows the adolescence of their virtuous daughter Matilda, whom Dorriforth has rejected out of pain at Miss Milner's moral failings as his wife. The contrast between Miss Milner and Matilda expresses Inchbald's critique of women's "fashionable" education, which she thought placed too much emphasis on personal appearance and sensibility.

== Plot ==
The novel is divided into four volumes, two each devoted to its two storylines.

The first volumes books follow the love story of young Miss Milner (we are never told her first name) and her guardian Dorriforth, who begins the novel as a Roman Catholic priest. Miss Milner is a seventeen-year-old orphan, whose father's deathbed wish entrusted her to Dorriforth's guardianship despite disapproving of Catholicism. Miss Milner admires Dorriforth but struggles to obey his strict rules. She flirts with Lord Lawnly, forcing Dorriforth to fight a duel to protect her honor. Several deaths in Dorriforth's family cause him to inherit the title of Lord Elmwood, bringing with it a social obligation to marry and have children to carry on the Elmwood family name. Miss Milner falls in love with Dorriforth. The Pope releases Dorriforth from his vow of chastity, and he becomes engaged to the fiancée of the former Elmwood heir, Miss Fenton; their relationship is tepid but prudent on both sides. Dorriforth then realises that he has passionate feelings for Miss Milner, which he resists both due to his engagement and due to his doubts about Miss Milner's suitability as a wife. Through a series of machinations, however, assisted by Miss Woodley (a kindhearted spinster) and Sanford (a Jesuit mentor of Dorriforth's), Dorriforth's engagement to Miss Fenton is broken and he and Miss Milner are engaged.

The third volume then abruptly transitions to the deathbed of Lady Elmwood (the former Miss Milner), some seventeen or eighteen years later. We learn that Lord Elmwood had been at his estate in the West Indies for so long that Lady Elmwood assumed he was unfaithful, and had an affair of her own with Lord Lawnly. When Lord Elmwood returns, he banishes Lady Elmwood and refuses to acknowledge their only child, Matilda. A desperate letter that Lady Elmwood writes before dying convinces him to permit Matilda to live on one of his estates, on the condition that he never sees her.

Volumes three and four then narrate Matilda's young adulthood, as she "haunts" Lord Elmwood's house. She is tutored by Miss Woodley and Sanford, and is raised to idolize the father whom she never sees. She meets her cousin, Rushbrook, her father's nephew and heir, and they begin a secret friendship, based largely around reading. One day, Matilda accidentally meets her father on a staircase, and he banishes her. She languishes and falls ill. When a Lord Margrave learns she is no longer under her father's protection, he abducts her. He is about to rape her when Lord Elmwood (who has had a change of heart) rescues her. Rushbrook, who has fallen in love with her, is now able to secure Lord Elmwood's approval for their marriage. Lord Elmwood tells him that Matilda herself must decide. Rushbrook begs her for her hand, and the narrator says: "Whether the heart of Matilda, such as it has been described, could sentence him to misery, the reader is left to surmise—and if he supposes that it did not, he has every reason to suppose their wedded life was a life of happiness." This is the end of the narrative, and the narrator then provides a moral lesson for the novel.

== Composition and publication ==
The first half of the novel was written between 1776 and 1779, and the second half between 1780 and 1791. Many believe that the novel was written with the famous actor John Philip Kemble, for whom Inchbald had also written plays, imagined as the character Dorriforth.

It was first published on 15 February 1791 by G. G. J. and J. Robinson, and went into a second edition that March.

== Major themes ==
The novel thematizes a problem of women's education in the period, highlighting the differences between the academic educations that men receive and the emphasis on personal appearance and sensibility in women's education. The character of Miss Milner represents what Inchbald saw as the current social norm for women's "fashionable" education, in which women were taught to use their bodies instead of their minds. The ending of the novel declares a moral lesson about women's education that links Miss Milner's unhappy ending and Matilda's happy one to the difference in their educations:

[The reader] has beheld the pernicious effects of an improper education in the destiny which attended the unthinking Miss Milner.—On the opposite side, what may not be hoped from that school of prudence—though of adversity—in which Matilda was bred?

And Mr. Milner, Matilda's grandfather, had better have given his fortune to a distant branch of his family—as Matilda's father once meant to do—so that he had given to his daughter

A PROPER EDUCATION.

However, the "proper" education that Matilda has received is not the purely-intellectual education that men receive, as Mary Wollstonecraft advocated the year after the novel's publication in her A Vindication of the Rights of Woman. Instead, Matilda's education balances both emotional sensibility and intellectual rationality. Another important aspect of Matilda's education is that, unlike Miss Milner, who participated widely in fashionable society as an heiress, Matilda is imprisoned in her father's house, and her daily experience is characterized by abjection.

== Style ==
Many scholars have observed theatrical aspects to the novel and attributed these to Inchbald's career as an actress and playwright. These scholars note that many scenes describe characters in terms of dramatic tableaus and theatrical gestures to evoke emotion. Nora Nachumi identifies these gestures as filling in to convey emotions that the characters are unable to express in other ways, such as when Dorriforth embraces the unconscious Matilda to communicate "a love he refuses to utter." She argues that the emotional language of gestures allows women to resit the logocentric discourse of patriarchy and achieve a limited degree of agency.

== Reception ==
The general reception of A Simple Story was favourable. Maria Edgeworth, a novelist and educational philosopher, wrote a letter to Elizabeth Inchbald, in which she warmly praised the story, saying that she had "never read any novel—I except none—I never read any novel that affected me so strongly, or that so completely possessed me with the belief in the real existence of all the people it represents".

After Inchbald's death A Simple Story passed out of notice for a time, until a 1908 reprint by G. L. Strachey "rescuing the novel from oblivion" brought it back into circulation. Terry Castle further revived scholarly interest in the novel in 1986, with her book Masquerade and Civilization, which calls it "the most elegant English fiction of the century (not excluding Sterne)" and "a small neglected masterpiece". The novel is still in print as of 2025.
