= Such Things Are =

1787 play

- Original language: English
- Written by: Elizabeth Inchbald
- Genre: Comedy
- Setting: Sumatra, Dutch East Indies

Premiere
- Date: 10 February 1787
- Place: Theatre Royal, Covent Garden, London

Such Things Are is a 1787 comedy play by the British writer and former actress Elizabeth Inchbald. It was first performed at the Theatre Royal, Covent Garden on 10 February 1787. The original Covent Garden cast included William Farren as Sultan, John Quick as Sir Luke Tremor, William Thomas Lewis as Mr Twineall, Alexander Pope as Mr Haswell, Joseph George Holman as Elvirus, William Macready as Mr Meanright, James Fearon as Zedan, James Thompson as First Keeper, William Cubitt as Second Keeper, Isabella Mattocks as Lady Tremor. The Irish premiere took place at the Smock Alley Theatre in Dublin on 16 April 1787.

== Bibliography ==
- Greene, John C. Theatre in Dublin, 1745-1820: A Calendar of Performances, Volume 6. Lexington Books, 2011.
- Nicoll, Allardyce. A History of English Drama 1660–1900: Volume III. Cambridge University Press, 2009.
- Hogan, C.B (ed.) The London Stage, 1660–1800: Volume V. Southern Illinois University Press, 1968.
- Robertson, Ben P. Elizabeth Inchbald's Reputation: A Publishing and Reception History. Routledge, 2015.
