= The Village Lawyer =

1787 play

- Original language: English
- Written by: George Colman the Elder
- Genre: Comedy
- Setting: England, Present day

Premiere
- Date: 28 August 1787
- Place: Theatre Royal, Haymarket, London

The Village Lawyer is a 1787 comedy play by the British writer George Colman the Elder, although it has also been mistakenly attributed to William Macready. A farce, it premiered as an afterpiece at the Theatre Royal, Haymarket in London on 28 August 1787. The Irish premiere took place at the Crow Street Theatre in Dublin on 5 August 1794 It was also staged at the Theatre Royal, Drury Lane. The original Haymarket cast included John Edwin as Sheepface, John Bannister as Scout, William Henry Moss as Justice Mittimus, William Parsons as Snarl and Lydia Webb as Mrs Scout.

== Bibliography ==
- Greene, John C. Theatre in Dublin, 1745-1820: A Calendar of Performances, Volume 6. Lexington Books, 2011.
- Nicoll, Allardyce. A History of English Drama 1660–1900: Volume III. Cambridge University Press, 2009.
- Hogan, C.B (ed.) The London Stage, 1660–1800: Volume V. Southern Illinois University Press, 1968.
