= A Concise Treatise on the Art of Angling =

1787 book by Thomas Best

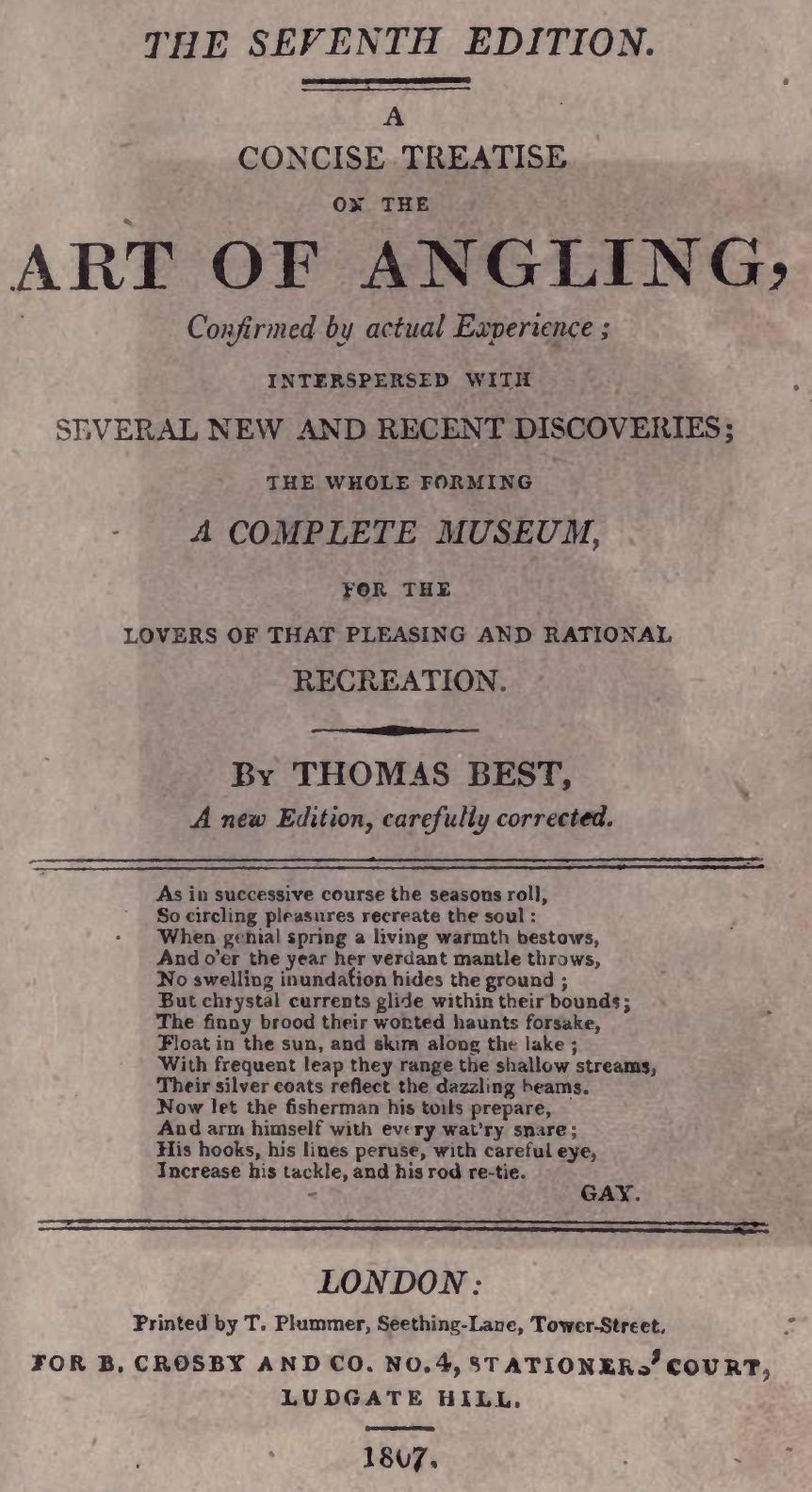
- Title Page - 7th Edition 1807
- Author: Thomas Best
- Language: English
- Subject: Fly fishing
- Publisher: B. Crosby and Co., London
- Publication date: 1787
- Publication place: England
- Pages: 186

A Concise Treatise on the Art of Angling: Confirmed by Actual Experiences and Minute Observations to Which is Added the Compleat Fly-Fisher is a fly fishing book written by Thomas Best, first published in London in 1787.

== Synopsis ==
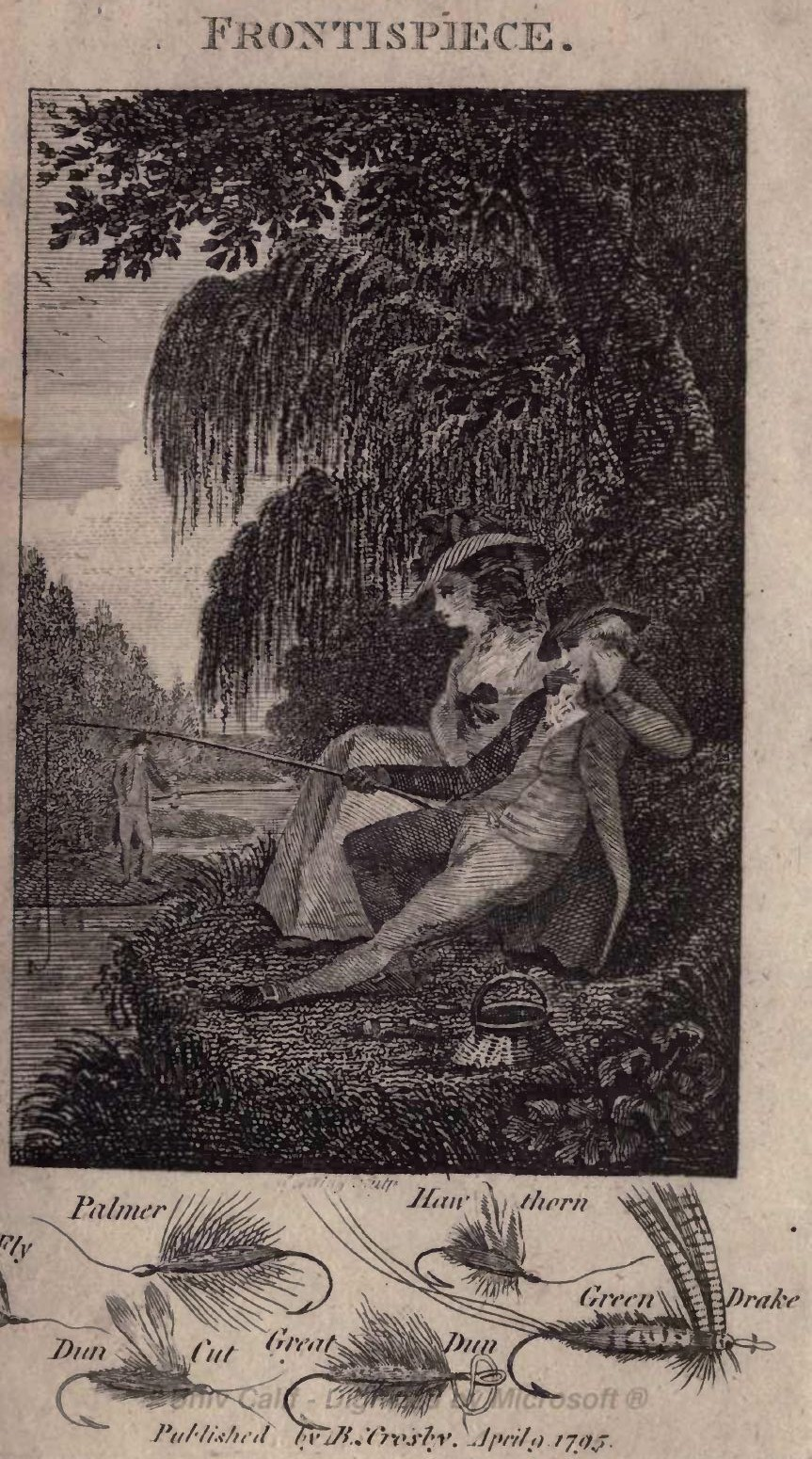
Frontispiece (7th Edition) showing very early renditions of artificial flies

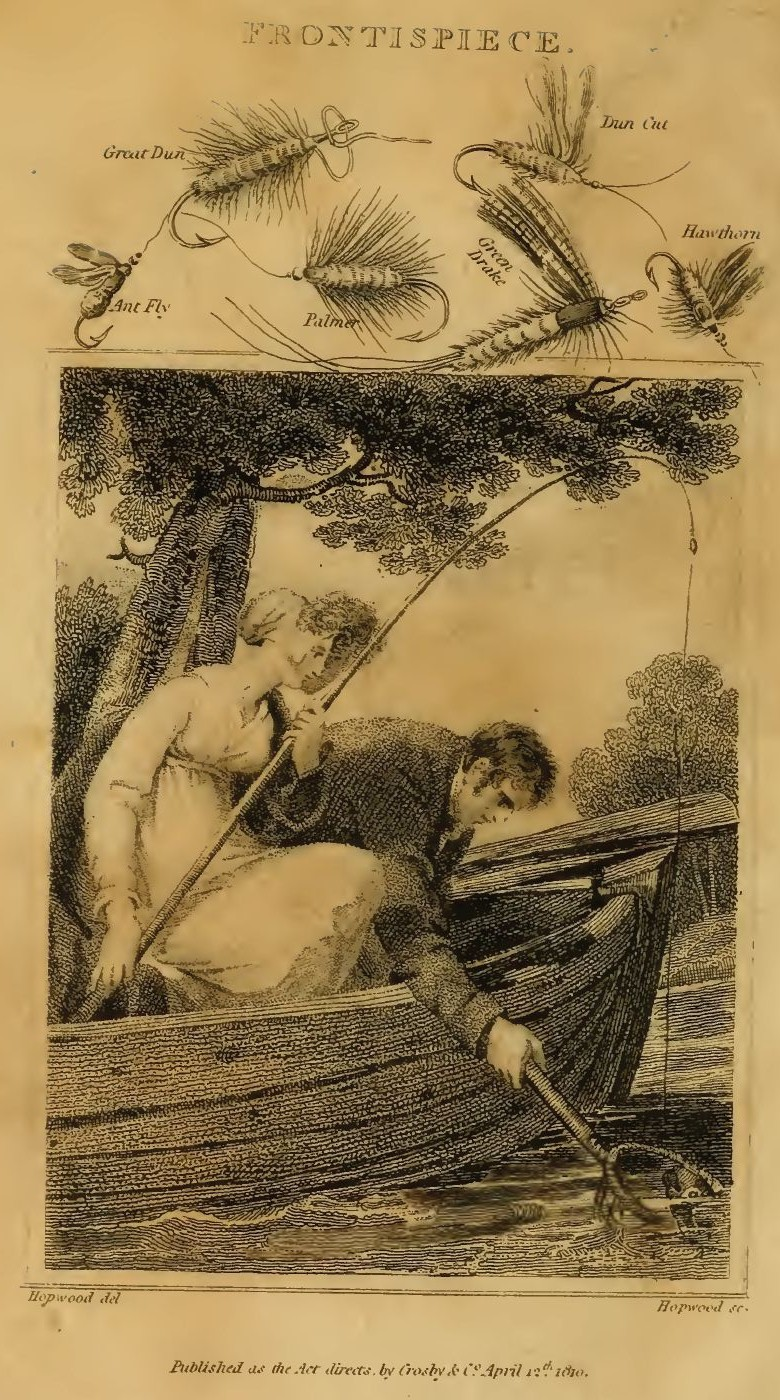
Frontispiece (9th Edition)

Although the first part of A Concise Treatise is a general angling work that provided little new information when it was published, the second part of the book, The Complete Fly-Fisher, was one of the earliest how-to books on the subject of fly fishing and artificial fly making. The book proved to be extremely popular and useful, being issued in thirteen editions from 1787 to 1846.

== Reviews ==
- In Ancient Angling Authors (1910) W. J. Turrell notes:

A Concise Treatise on the Art of Angling. . . . By Thomas Best, Gent. Late of his Majesty's Drawing Room in the Tower, London, appeared in 1787. Thirteen editions of this work were published;, to the tenth and eleventh editions the greater part of Nobbes' Compleat Troller was added. This book, though it contains nothing strikingly original, is a thoroughly practical treatise on the art of angling...

- In Notable Angling Literature (1945) James Robb notes about Best and A Concise Treatise:

He makes mention of the multiplying reel, the first time we hear of it, but evidently not unknown before his day. In the second part of the book, which has the special title The Complete Fly-fisher, he describes the dressing of many flies and their killing powers. Upon the whole, it is a practical and sensible work.

== Contents ==
(From the 9th Edition)

- Part I - Art of Angling
  - Chapter I - A Description of Fishes, according to Natural History with the best methods of Breeding, mid Feeding Carp, &c
  - Chapter II - The best Manner of Making and Chasing Rods, Lines, Hooks, &c
  - Chapter III - The general Baits used in Angling, where found, and how preserved.
  - Chapter IV - Of natural Fly-Fishing, with a Description of Flies generally used, and a choice collection of Rules and Hints to be observed in Angling
  - Chapter V - A Description of the Fish generally angled for in England and Wales, with the proper Times and Seasons, to fish for them; their peculiar haunts, spawning Time, and most killing, Baits
  - Chapter VI - The most scientific Method of making Fish-Ponds, Stews, &c.; to which are added, several Arcana in the Art of Angling
- Part II - The Complete Fly Fisher: or Everyman his own fly-maker
  - Chapter I - Observations concerning artificial Fly-angling, with proper Directions for the Angler's Rods, Lines, &c.
  - Chapter II - A List of the Materials necessary for an Angler to have, and the best Method to make the Palmer and May Fly.
  - Chapter III - The Names and the best Manner of dubbing the different Artificial Flies, which are generally known and will kill Fish on any Water from the beginning of March to the end of September
  - Chapter IV - A second List of very killing Flies
  - Chapter V - The best Rules for Artificial Fly-fishing
  - Chapter VI - Of the principal Rivers in England, and particularly of the Thames
  - Chapter VII - Of the Game Laws relative to Angling
  - Chapter VIII - Prognostics of the Weather, independent of the Barometer, extracted from the best Authorities
  - Chapter IX - Rules to Judge of the Barometer

== Other editions ==
From Bibliotheca Piscatoria, T. Westwood & T. Satchell (1883)

- Best, Thomas (1787). A Concise Treatise on the Art of Angling (2nd ed.). London: B. Crosby & Co.
- Best, Thomas (1794). A Concise Treatise on the Art of Angling (3rd ed.). London: B. Crosby & Co.
- Best, Thomas (1798). A Concise Treatise on the Art of Angling (4th ed.). London: B. Crosby & Co.
- Best, Thomas (1802). A Concise Treatise on the Art of Angling (5th ed.). London: B. Crosby & Co.
- Best, Thomas (1804). A Concise Treatise on the Art of Angling (6th ed.). London: B. Crosby & Co.
- Best, Thomas (1807). A Concise Treatise on the Art of Angling (7th ed.). London: B. Crosby & Co.
- Best, Thomas (1808). A Concise Treatise on the Art of Angling (8th ed.). London: B. Crosby & Co.
- Best, Thomas (1810). A Concise Treatise on the Art of Angling (9th ed.). London: B. Crosby & Co.
- Best, Thomas (1814). A Concise Treatise on the Art of Angling (10th ed.). London: B. Crosby & Co.
- Best, Thomas (1822). A Concise Treatise on the Art of Angling (11th ed.). London: B. Crosby & Co.
- Best, Thomas (1832). A Concise Treatise on the Art of Angling (12th ed.). London: B. Crosby & Co.
- Best, Thomas (1846). A Concise Treatise on the Art of Angling (13th ed.). London: B. Crosby & Co.

From Antiquarian Booksellers Online

- Best, Thomas (1992). A Concise Treatise on the Art of Angling (Limited Edition Facsimile (175) ed.). London: Market Drayton.
- Best, Thomas (2008). A Concise Treatise on the Art of Angling (Facsimile ed.). Whitefish, MT: Kessinger Publishing, LLC. ISBN 978-1-4369-0836-8.

== See also ==
- Bibliography of fly fishing
