= Mrs Webb =

18th-century British comedienne, actress, and singer

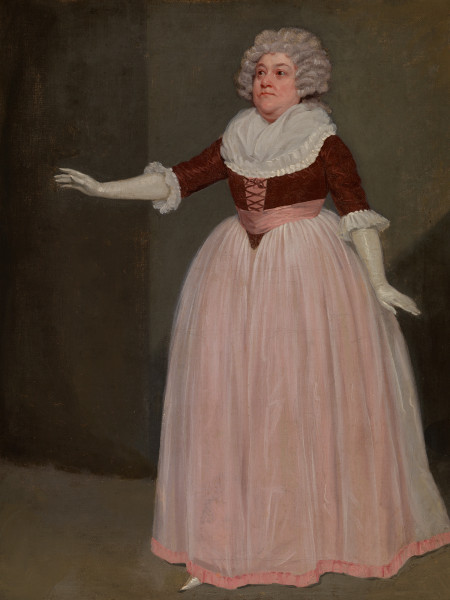
- as Mrs Dove
- Born: Lydia Child; 1736/7
- Died: 1797; London
- Other names: Mrs Richard Webb
- Occupations: Singer and actor
- Known for: Comedian
- Partner: Richard Webb

Mrs Webb or Mrs Richard Webb or Mrs Day born Lydia or Lucia Child (1736/7 – 1797) was a British comic actress and singer. For fifteen years she appeared at Covent Garden and at the Haymarket theatres where she was a popular comedian.

== Life ==
She is thought to have been born with the name Lydia Child in 1736 or 1737 (Some give her name as Lucia). She first came to notice in 1764 when she made her acting debut in Norwich. The following year she was working in Colchester when she is said to have interceded to save the job of "Plausible Jack" Palmer. In 1772 she was acting in Edinburgh where she was using the name of "Mrs Day" although in 1774 she was using the name of Mrs Dicky Webb and she was in Scotland until 1779. She was now known for comedy roles although she also appeared in Shakespeare plays. She played Mrs Malaprop, Mrs Peachum in The Beggar's Opera and also appeared in The Recruiting Officer, Love for Love, She Stoops to Conquer and The School for Scandal.

She had an adopted daughter and possibly a son. Her daughter was introduced to the stage in England in 1788 but she made her name as "Mrs Wilmot" in America. She was said to be the second most popular actress in America and a favourite of General Washington.

She appeared at Covent Garden and at the Haymarket theatres where she was one of the most popular comedians for fifteen years.

In 1787 she appeared as "Mrs Dove" in Cumberland's comedy and she was recorded in this role in her Samuel de Wilde painting.

== Legacy ==
In 1790 she published her "Secret History of the Green Room" which was an autobiography. In 1833 Samuel De Wilde exhibited a painting of her which is now in the possession on the Garrick Club. Webb had a daughter who is referred to as Lucia or Lydia who also acted but with less success than her mother.
