= Elizabeth Inchbald =

English novelist, actress, dramatist, and translator (1753–1821)

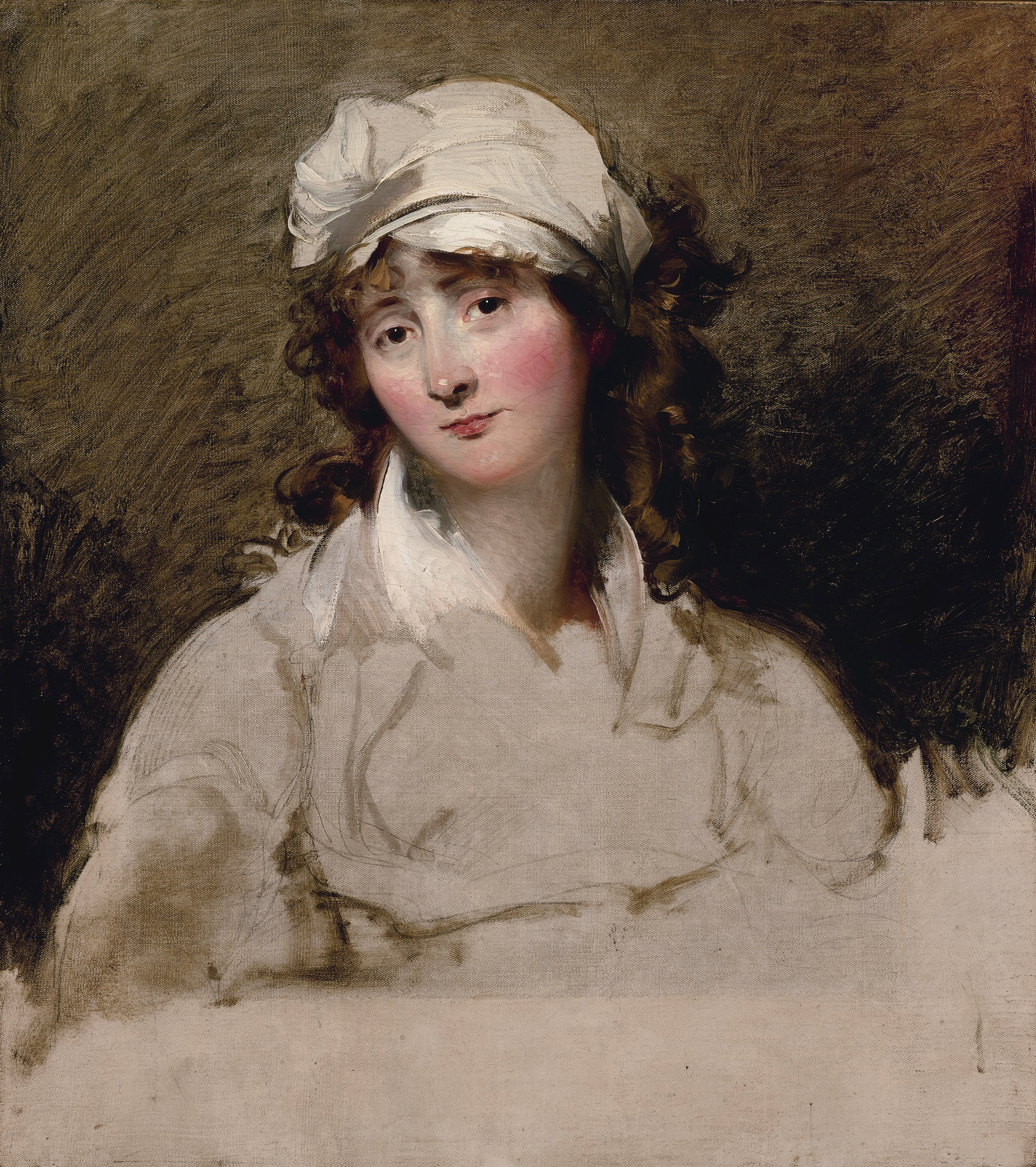
- Portrait of Elizabeth Inchbald by Thomas Lawrence, c. 1796
- Born: Elizabeth Simpson; 15 October 1753; Stanningfield, England
- Died: 1 August 1821 (aged 67); Kensington, England
- Occupations: Novelist, actress, dramatist, translator
- Writing career
- Period: 1784–1810
- Notable works: A Simple Story; Nature and Art

Elizabeth Inchbald (née Simpson, 15 October 1753 – 1 August 1821) was an English novelist, actress, dramatist, and translator. Her two novels, A Simple Story and Nature and Art, have received particular critical attention.

== Life ==
Born on 15 October 1753 at Stanningfield, near Bury St Edmunds, Suffolk, Elizabeth was the eighth of the nine children of Mary Simpson (née Rushbrook) and her husband John Simpson (died 1761), a farmer. The family, like several others in the neighbourhood, was Roman Catholic. Her brother was sent to school, but Elizabeth and her sisters were educated at home.

Inchbald had a speech impediment. Focused on acting from a young age, she worked hard to manage her stammer, but her family discouraged an attempt in early 1770 to gain a position at the Norwich Theatre. That same year her brother George became an actor. Still determined, Inchbald went to London to become an actress in April 1772 at the age of 18.

It was a difficult beginning: some observers thought her stammer affected her performance and the audience's reaction. Furthermore, young and alone, she later described having to defend herself from the sexual advances of stage manager James Dodd and theatre manager John Taylor. Two months after her arrival in London, in June, she agreed to marry a fellow Catholic, actor Joseph Inchbald (1735–1779), possibly at least in part for protection. Joseph at that time was not well-known, was twice Elizabeth's age, and had two illegitimate sons. The couple did not have children together and the marriage is believed to have had difficulties. The Inchbalds appeared on the stage together for the first time on 4 September 1772 in Shakespeare's King Lear. In October 1772, the couple began a demanding tour in Scotland with West Digges's theatre company that continued for almost four years. In 1776, they moved to France in order for Joseph to learn to paint and Elizabeth to study French. However, they were penniless within a month. They returned to Britain and moved to Liverpool where Inchbald, after joining Joseph Younger's company, met actors Sarah Siddons and her brother John Philip Kemble, both of whom became important friends. The Inchbalds later moved to Canterbury and Yorkshire and in 1777 were hired by Tate Wilkinson's company.

After Joseph Inchbald's sudden death in June 1779, Inchbald continued to act for several years, in Dublin, London, and elsewhere. Her acting career, only moderately successful, spanned seventeen years. She appeared in many classical roles and in new plays such as Hannah Cowley's The Belle's Stratagem.

She died on 1 August 1821 in Kensington and is buried in the churchyard of St Mary Abbots. Her gravestone calls her one "whose writings will be cherished while truth, simplicity, and feelings, command public admiration." In 1833, a two-volume Memoirs of Mrs. Inchbald by James Boaden was published by Richard Bentley.

== Written work ==
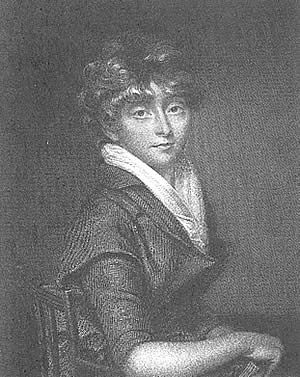

While relatively unknown as an actress, after her husband's death Inchbald went on to become a celebrated playwright and author. Her success as a writer meant she did not need a spouse's financial support, and she did not remarry. Her literary career began with pieces in The Artist and the Edinburgh Review. Between 1784 and 1805, nineteen of her comedies, sentimental dramas, and farces, many of them translations from French or German originals, were performed in London theatres. Her first play to be produced was A Mogul Tale, with her in the lead female role of Selina. In 1780, she joined the Covent Garden Company and played the breeches role of Bellario in Philaster. Her plays were also produced at the Haymarket Theatre. She wrote between twenty-one and twenty-three plays — the exact number is disputed — and eighteen were published.

She is probably best known in the twenty-first century for her two novels, A Simple Story (1791) and Nature and Art (1796). A political radical and friend of William Godwin and Thomas Holcroft, her beliefs are clearer in her novels than in her plays, due to constrictions on the patent theatres of Georgian London, though even there she took risks. "Inchbald's life was marked by tensions between, on the one hand, political radicalism, a passionate nature evidently attractive to a number of her admirers, and a love of independence, and on the other hand, a desire for social respectability and a strong sense of the emotional attraction of authority figures." One critic describes the complexity of her writing as "richly textured with strands of resistance, boldness, and libidinal thrills". An example of this contradictory impulse may be seen in her biography when, despite their shared political beliefs, she quarrelled publicly with Mary Wollstonecraft in 1797, when Wollstonecraft's marriage to William Godwin made it clear that she had not been married to Gilbert Imlay, the father of her elder daughter Fanny. This incident was deeply resented by Godwin.

She also did considerable editorial and critical work. A four-volume autobiography was destroyed before her death on the advice of her confessor, but she left some of her diaries. The latter are held at the Folger Shakespeare Library and an edition was published in 2007.

== Reception and reputation ==
Many of the plays she translated were farces, and they were popular with audiences. Over a period of twenty years, she translated one or two pieces a year, one notable example being Lovers' Vows, a translation of a play by August von Kotzebues. Lovers' Vows ran for forty-two nights when first performed in 1798: a highly successful run. Lovers' Vows (1798) was subsequently featured as a focus of moral controversy by Jane Austen in her novel Mansfield Park (1814).

Inchbald's novels, in particular A Simple Story, were well reviewed. However, her theatrical reviews were sometimes received poorly by other critics.

While in the 1920s she was described by one critic as "a charming woman" who was sadly ignorant of Shakespeare, in recent decades Inchbald has aroused considerable critical interest, particularly among scholars of women's writing. Her two novels have been frequently reprinted and American critic Terry Castle called her A Simple Story "the most elegant English fiction of the eighteenth century".

== Works ==
Plays
- Mogul Tale; or, The Descent of the Balloon, 1784
- Appearance Is Against Them, 1785
- I'll Tell You What, 1785
- The Widow's Vow, 1786
- The Midnight Hour, 1787
- Such Things Are, 1787
- All on a Summer's Day, 1787
- Animal Magnetism, 1788
- The Child of Nature, 1788
- The Married Man, 1789
- Next Door Neighbours, 1791
- Cross Partners, 1792
- Everyone Has His Fault, 1793
- The Wedding Day, 1794
- Wives as They Were and Maids as They Are, 1797
- Lovers' Vows, 1798
- The Wise Man of the East, 1799
- To Marry or Not to Marry, 1805
- The Massacre, 1792, not performed
- A Case of Conscience, published 1833
- The Ancient Law, not performed
- The Hue and Cry, unpublished
- Young Men and Old Women (Lovers No Conjurers), adaptation of Le Méchant; unpublished

Novels

- A Simple Story, 1791
- Nature and Art, 1796

Critical/editorial work

- The British Theatre. 25 vols., 1806–1809
- Collection of Farces and Afterpieces. 7 vols., 1809
- The Modern Theatre. 10 vols., 1811

=== Etexts ===
- Elizabeth Inchbald at the Eighteenth-Century Poetry Archive (ECPA)
- Works by Elizabeth Inchbald at Faded Page (Canada)
- Lovers' Vows . Eds Thomas C. Crochunis and Michael Eberle-Sinatra, with an introduction by Jonathan Wordsworth [15 January 2000].
- Lovers' Vows at Project Gutenberg
- The Massacre . Eds. Thomas C. Crochunis and Michael Eberle-Sinatra, with an Introduction by Danny O'Quinn. British Women Playwrights Around 1800. 15 April 1999.
- Nature and Art at Project Gutenberg
- Such Things Are . Eds. Gioia Angeletti and Thomas C. Crochunis, with an introduction by Gioia Angeletti. British Women Playwrights Around 1800. 15 May 2003.
- The Wedding Day . Eds. Thomas C. Crochunis and Susan Hyon. British Women Playwrights Around 1800. 15 June 2003.
- Wives as They Were and Maids as They Are . Gioia Angeletti and Thomas C. Crochunis. British Women Playwrights Around 1800. 15 May 2003.

=== Adaptations ===
- 'The Massacre' (part of the 'Restoring The Repertoire' series from the Theatre Royal, Bury St Edmunds, UK)
- 'Wives as they Were, and Maids as they Are' (part of the 'Restoring The Repertoire' series from the Theatre Royal, Bury St Edmunds, UK)
