= Lydia Webb =

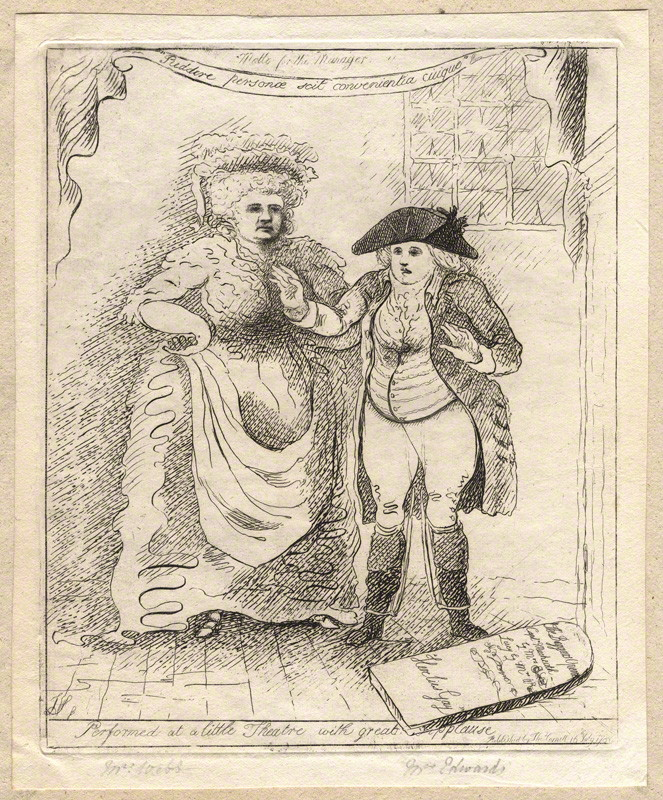
- Lydia Webb (right) in an etching by James Sayers, 1786
- Born: 1736 or 1737; Norwich, England
- Died: 24 November 1793; United Kingdom
- Occupation: Actress

Lydia Webb (1736 or 1737-1793) was an English actress. She started acting in Norwich. She was married twice. First, she married a man named Mr. Day. Second, she married a Mr. Webb. Her first notable performance was on 21 November 1772 at the Theatre Royal, Edinburgh, performing in The West Indian. She died in 1793.

== Career ==
Webb was a versatile and proactive performer. She was in more than 50 plays. When she was elderly, she played more "grotesque characters." She performed many parts including:

- Portia, The Merchant of Venice, 29 November 1773
- Mrs. Peachum, The Beggar's Opera, Covent Garden Theatre
- Mrs. Honeycombe, Polly Honeycombe, Haymarket Theatre
- Glumdalca, Tom Thumb, Covent Garden Theatre
- Queen, Hamlet
- Emilia, Othello

and many other performances. In 1786, she was featured in an illustration by James Sayers, which is now held in the collection of the National Portrait Gallery, London.
