= John Quick (actor) =

English actor

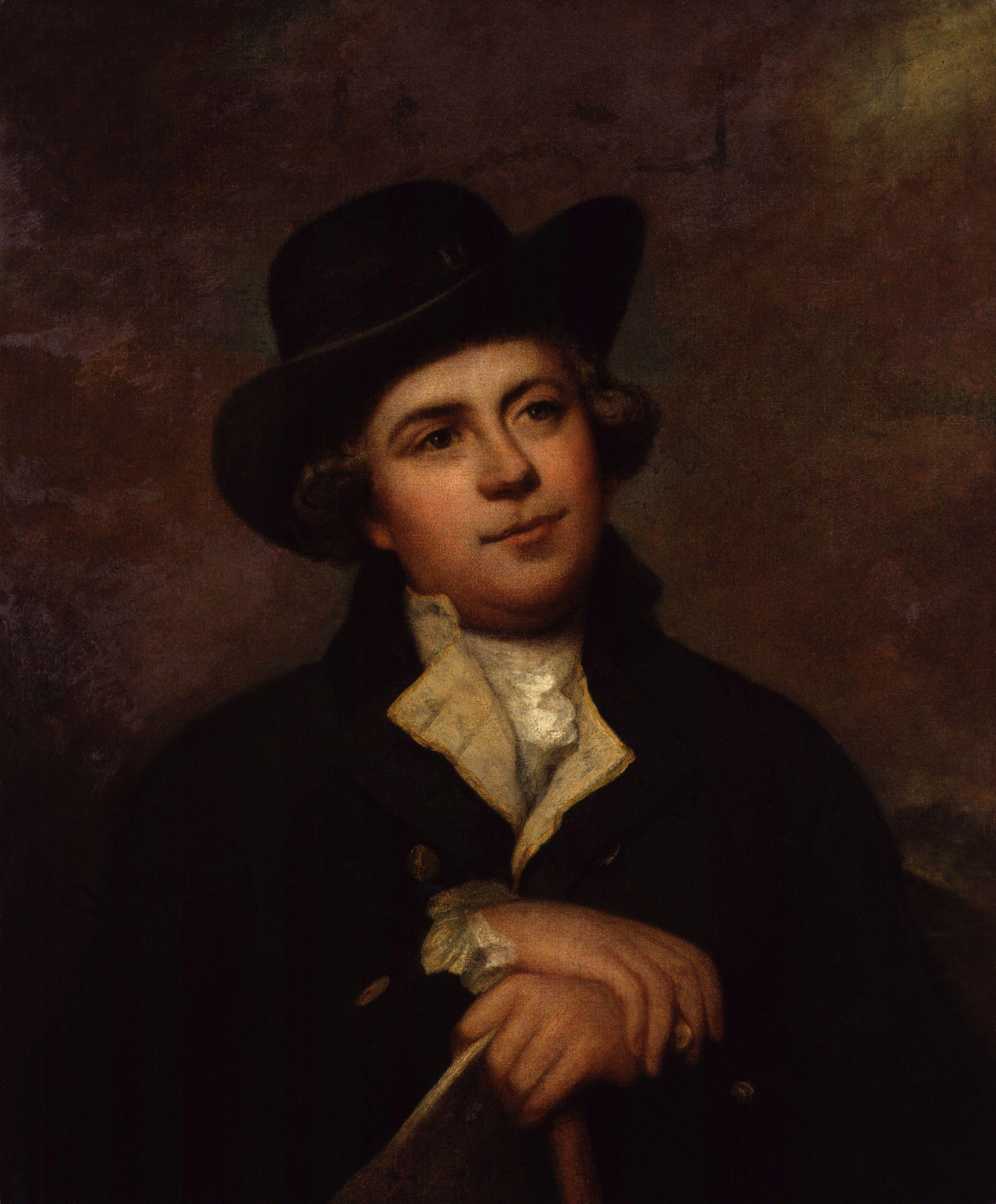
- Quick by Thomas Lawranson
- Born: 1748; Whitechapel, London, England
- Died: 4 April 1831 (aged 82–83); Islington
- Occupations: Comedian, actor
- Years active: 1760–1813
- Known for: Acting in Shakespearean and contemporary comedies
- Spouse: Miss Ann Parker (1752–?)
- Children: William Quick (1786–?) and Mary Ann Davenport

John Quick (1748 – 4 April 1831) was a British comic actor.

== Life ==
The son of a brewer, he was born in Whitechapel, London. At age 13 he left his home and joined Oliver Carr's theatrical company at Fulham, where he played Altamont in the Fair Penitent, receiving three shillings as a share in the profits. For some years, in Kent and Surrey, he played Romeo, George Barnewell, Hamlet, Jaffier, Tancred, and other tragic characters, and in 1766 was at the Haymarket Theatre under the management of Samuel Foote, with Edward Shuter, John Bannister, and John Palmer. His performance, for Shuter's benefit, of Mordecai in Love à la Mode commended him to Covent Garden, where, on 7 November 1767, he was the original Postboy in Colman's Oxonian in Town; on 14 December the First Ferret in the Royal Merchant, an operatic version of the Beggar's Bush; and on 29 January 1768 the original Postboy in Oliver Goldsmith's Good-natured Man. At Covent Garden, with occasional visits to Liverpool, Portsmouth, and other towns, and to Bristol, where he was for a time manager of the King Street Theatre, Quick remained during most of his career.

Quick's performances were at first as clowns, rustics, or comic servants. He was seen as Peter in Romeo and Juliet, Simon Pure in A Bold Stroke for a Wife, Third Witch in Macbeth, Gripe in The Cheats of Scapin, the First Gravedigger in Hamlet, and many similar characters. His original parts at this period included Ostler in Colman's Man and Wife, or the Shakespeare Jubilee, Skiff in Richard Cumberland's Brothers on 2 December 1769, and clown to the harlequin of Charles Lee Lewes in the pantomime of Mother Shipton on 26 December 1772. On 16 March 1772 at the first performance of The Wife in the Right by Mrs Griffith, at Covent Garden, Quick was Squeezem, a lawyer. The prologue and epilogue met with applause later the play had to stop for half an hour, The play was not well received and some of the audience broke the chandeliers. On 5 June 1772 Quick was playing a theatre in Liverpool as Prattle in The Deuce is in him.

In November 1772 he married a daughter of the Rev Parker of Bristol. He had by her a son, William, and a daughter, Mrs. Mary Anne Davenport. He was so small in frame that Anthony Pasquin calls him "the smart tiny Quick". He was the favourite actor of George III.

At Covent Garden he was, on 8 December 1772, the original Consol in O'Brien's Cross Purposes, and on 6 February 1773 the original Momus in O'Hara's Golden Pippin.

These performances paved the way for his triumph, on 14 March, as the original Tony Lumpkin in She Stoops to Conquer. The character had been refused by Henry Woodward. The following season (1773–4) saw him promoted to Mawworm in The Hypocrite, Grumio, Varland in the West Indian, and Autolycus Mufti in Don Sebastian. On 31 January 1774 he played Old Rents in the Jovial Crew, Foresight and Town Clerk in Much Ado about Nothing; and on 17 January 1775 he was the first Bob Acres in The Rivals. 21 November 1776 as Venture in The Seraglio. Scores of comic characters were then assigned to him. At Bristol in August 1777 he was Antient Pistol in King Henry V and Tycho in A Christmas Tale In 1777 Bell publisher of The British Theatre advertised the weekly publication of plays with no 71 Constant Couple; with an vignette of Mr Quick as Alderman Smugler. The NEW ENGLISH THEATRE published in twelve volumes included part 35 Funeral; Mr Clark and Mr Quick as Lord Brumpton and Mr Sable, vignette by West and Byrne and published this day. On 18 August 1783 he was Bishop Gardiner in King Henry the Eighth and Bowkitt in The Son in Law at the Theatre-Royal, Liverpool.

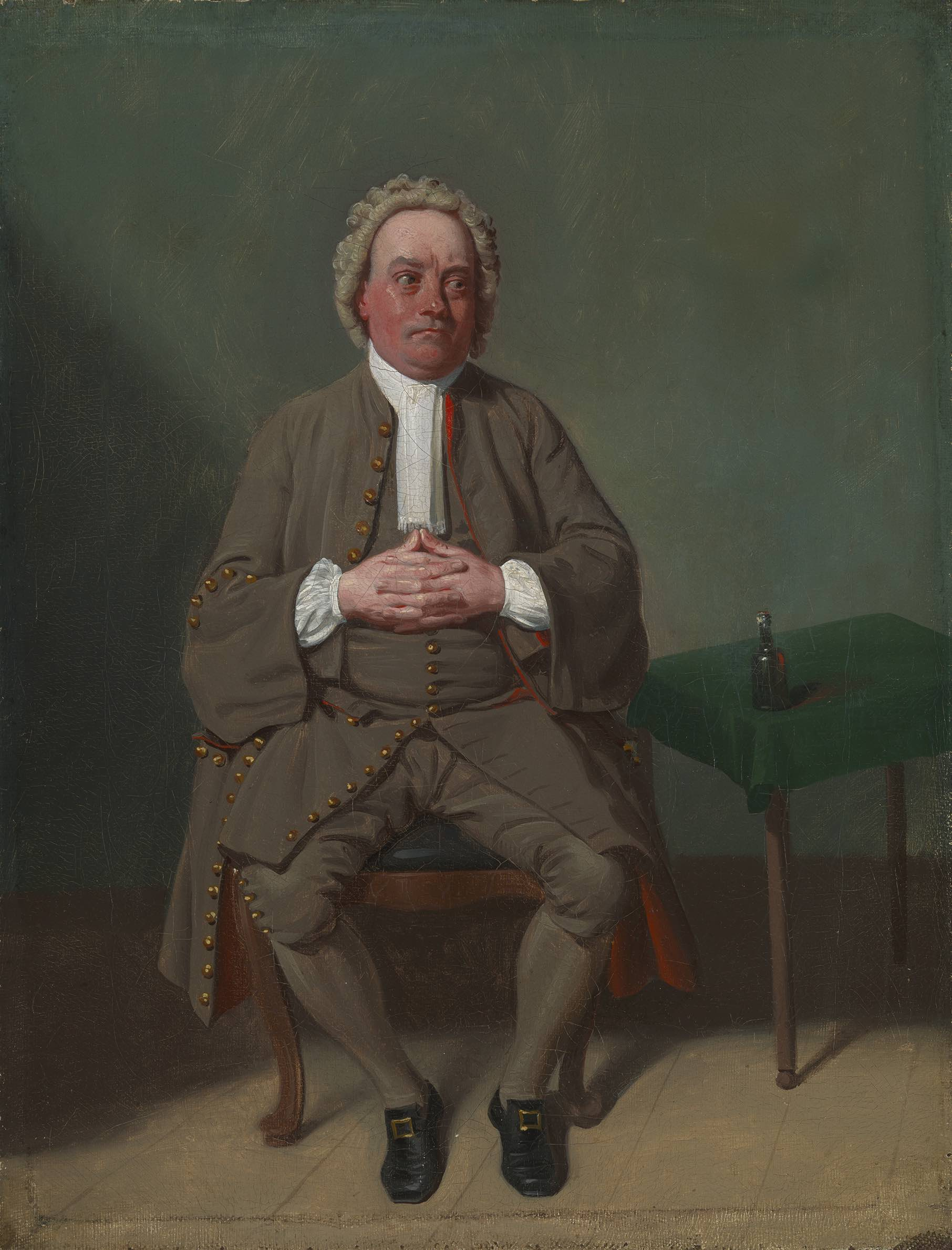
Samuel De Wilde, Portrait of the actor John Quick as Vellum, 1792.

On 6 April 1790, for his benefit, Quick appeared as Richard III. He took the character seriously at the outset, until the laughter of the audience proved irresistible. On 14 March 1791 Quick created the part of Cockletop, an antiquary, in O'Keeffe's Modern Antiques, and on 16 April that of Sir George Thunder in his Wild Oats. On 18 February 1792 he was the first Silky in Holcroft's Road to Ruin. In the August he was at Winchester as Barnaby in Barnaby Brittle and later Colonel Hubbub in Notoriety and Barnaby again at Portsmouth theatre in the September. On 2 September he appears as Scrub in The Beaux' Stratagem with Animal Magnetism as the part of the Doctor at the New Theatre, Windsor. He was the first Solus in Mrs. Inchbald's Every one has his Fault, on 5 February 1794. In September 1795 Mr Quick of Covent Garden theatre is arrived at the Hotwells, from Weymouth, in consequence of a violent indisposition. On 27 September 1797 he appeared as an eccentric apothecary in the first performance of False Impressions by Cumberland, also appearing was Mrs Davenport. He created many further parts in the years that followed. On 11 April 1798, for his benefit, he gave a description of the Roman puppet show. On 13 April he played his last original part, probably Admiral Delroy, in Cumberland's Eccentric Lover.

Around this time, in declining health, he resigned his long engagement at Covent Garden. To his disappointment he was not engaged the following season. On 9 May 1799, for the benefit of Miss Leak, he appeared for the first time at Drury Lane, and played Hardy in the Belle's Stratagem, and Lovegold in the Miser. On 27 July 1784 at Theatre-Royal, Manchester he was Sir Harry Sycamore in The Maid of the Mill

In January 1800 he was engaged by Kemble for twelve nights at the latter's Theatre-Royal, Edinburgh making this his first appearance in Scotland. In February he was Mr Hardy in The Belle's Stratagem and Justice Credulous in St.Patrick's Day on the 12th, Crepe in The Busybody and Cadwalladea in The Author on the 13th. On 12 June 1800, for O'Keeffe's benefit, he played at Covent Garden Alibi in the Lie of the Day, and Drugget in Three Weeks after Marriage; and for another benefit appeared next day as Isaac in The Duenna. On 3 August at Weymouth he performed in front of the king as Scrub in Beaux' Stratagem. On 22 September he was in Reading as Solomon in The Quaker. He was engaged at the Theatre-Royal, Hull for four nights, on Tuesday 4 November in The Miser and Who's the Dupe? as Lovegold and Old Doiley.

In March 1804 his appearances included Scrub in Beaux' Stratagem at the Canterbury theatre and as Jack Credulous in Saint Patrick's Day at Faversham theatre.

In 1809 he took a tour in the north, appearing in Edinburgh, 25 January, as Sir Benjamin Dove in the Brothers. In 1809, in the same character, he made his first appearance at the Lyceum.

He was with William Shaftoe Robertson's Lincoln Circuit in 1809

THEATRE, PETERBOROUGH. Mr ROBERTSON with the Utmost respect begs to inform the city of Peterborough and its vicinity, that, ever anxious of contributing to their amusement, he shall (as announced last Saturday) have the pleasure of introducing, for Three Nights, that celebrated Comic Actor, Mr. QUICK, Of the late Theatre Royal, Covent Garden, Who will make his first Appearance FRIDAY AUGUST 11th, In the Comedy of THE WAY TO GET MARRIED. Toby Allspice ....Mr. QUICK, originally performed by him at the late Theatre Royal, Covent Garden. With (adapted to a Three-act Piece) THE MISER. The Miser .....Mr. QUICK. On SATURDAY the 12th, Shakespeare's Comedy AS YOU LIKE IT. Touchstone by Mr. QUICK. And the Farce of WHO's THE DUPE. Old Doily by Mr. QUICK. And on MONDAY the 14th, for the BENEFIT of Mr. QUICK, The celebrated Comedy THE BELLES' STRATAGEM. Old Hardy by Mr. QUICK. And the Farce of BARNABY BRITTLE. Brittle Mr. QUICK. On which night the Theatre will close for the Season. THEATRE, SPALDING. MR. ROBERTSON most respectfully informs the town of Spalding and vicinity, that he shall open the Theatre for his usual Season, the week after next, and feels pleased in the opportunity of having made an Engagement with Mr. QUICK, Of the late Theatre Royal, Covent Garden, For Three Nights Performance At the THEATRE, SPALDING. Particulars of Mr. Quick's Nights and Performanes will appear in a future advertisement.

In April 1810 he again appeared on the Lincoln Circuit, at the Georgian Wisbech Theatre, on 9th as Toby Allspice in The Way to Get Married and as The Miser in the Farce of that name, on the 11th as Touchstone in As You Like It, and on 13th as Old Hardy in The Belle's Stratagem, finally on 14th as Sir Bashful Content in The Way to Keep Him.

On 24 May 1813 he came again out of retirement, taking part at the Haymarket Opera House in a benefit to Mrs. Mattocks, in which he played Don Felix in The Wonder.

Out of his earnings he saved £10,000, on the interest of which he lived, residing during his later years in Hornsey Row, subsequently Will's Row, Islington. He used to preside over a gathering held at the King's Head tavern, Islington. He died on Monday 11 April 1831, at his residence, near Islington church and was buried beneath the old chapel-of-ease at Lower Holloway.
