= Alexander Pope (actor) =

Irish actor and painter (1763–1835)

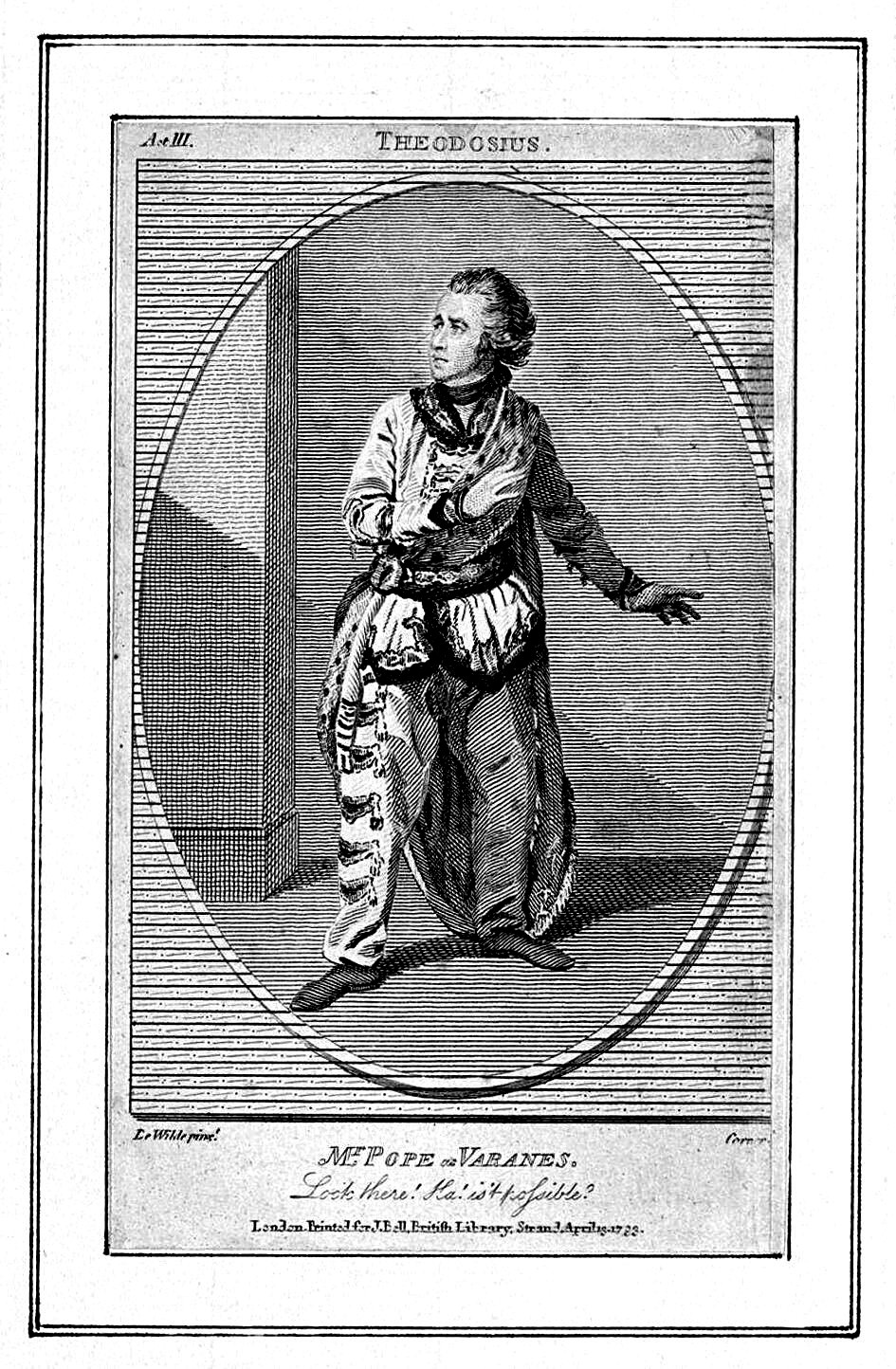
- Alexander Pope as Varanes in tragedy Theodosius by Nathaniel Lee.1793
- Born: 1763; Cork, Ireland
- Died: 22 March 1835 (aged 71–72)
- Known for: Actor
- Spouses: Elizabeth Younge, Maria Ann Campion, Clara Maria Leigh

Alexander Pope (1763 – 22 March 1835) was an Irish actor and painter.

== Life ==
He was born in Cork, Ireland. He studied to follow his father's profession of miniature painting and continued to do so as late as 1821, exhibiting them at the Royal Academy. However, he first took the stage in 1785, appearing in London as Oroonoko at Covent Garden. He remained at this theatre almost continuously for nearly twenty years, then at the Haymarket until his retirement, playing leading parts, chiefly tragic. He was well known as Othello and Henry VIII.

He played for the first time in Edinburgh on 15 June 1786, as Othello.

== Family ==
He was married three times. His first wife, Elizabeth Pope (1744–1797), a favourite English actress of great versatility, was billed before her marriage as Miss Younge. His second wife, Maria Ann Campion (1775–1803), also a popular actress, was a member of an Irish family. His third wife, born Clara Maria Leigh (1768–1838), was the widow of the artist Francis Wheatley, and herself a skillful painter of figures and flowers, under the name of Mrs Pope.

== Selected roles ==
- Preux in Eloisa by Frederick Reynolds (1786)
- Haswell in Such Things Are by Elizabeth Inchbald (1787)
- Lord Ormond in The Ton by Eglantine Wallace (1788)
- Frederick in The School for Widows by Richard Cumberland (1789)
- Columbus in Columbus by Thomas Morton (1792)
- Sir Alexander Seaton in The Siege of Berwick by Edward Jerningham (1793)
- Warford in How to Grow Rich by Frederick Reynolds (1793)
- Mr Irwin in Everyone Has His Fault by Elizabeth Inchbald (1793)
- Darnley in The Rage by Frederick Reynolds (1794)
- Asgill in The Town Before You by Hannah Cowley (1794)
- Baron St Pol in The Siege of Meaux by Henry James Pye (1794)
- Mr Mordent in The Deserted Daughter by Thomas Holcroft (1795)
- Earl of Pembroke in England Preserved by George Watson-Taylor (1795)
- Captain Faulkener in The Way to Get Married by Thomas Morton (1796)
- Voltimar in The Days of Yore by Richard Cumberland (1796)
- Charles Stanley in A Cure for the Heart Ache by Thomas Morton (1797)
- Sir George Evelyn in Wives as They Were and Maids as They Are by Elizabeth Inchbald (1797)
- Mr Deleval in He's Much to Blame by Thomas Holcroft (1798)
- Sir Philip Blandford in Speed the Plough by Thomas Morton (1798)
- Greville in Secrets Worth Knowing by Thomas Morton (1798)
- Frederick Fervid in Five Thousand a Year by Thomas Dibdin (1799)
- Sir Hervey Sutherland in Management by Frederick Reynolds (1799)
- Leonard Vizorly in The Votary of Wealth by Joseph George Holman (1799)
- Albert, Lord of Thurn in Joanna of Montfaucon by Richard Cumberland (1800)
- George Howard in The Marriage Promise by John Allingham (1803)
- Dorland in Hearts of Oak by John Allingham (1803)
- Captain Sentamour in The Sailor's Daughter by Richard Cumberland (1804)
- Heartright in A Hint to Husbands by Richard Cumberland (1806)
- Baron in Edgar by George Manners (1806)
- Sir Arthur St Albyn in Begone Dull Care by Frederick Reynolds (1808)
- Marquis Valdez in Remorse by Samuel Taylor Coleridge (1813)
- St. Aldobrand in Bertram by Charles Maturin (1816)
- Prince Aymer in The Hebrew by George Soane (1820)
- Drusus in Caius Gracchus by James Sheridan Knowles (1823)
- Clotaire in Ben Nazir by Thomas Colley Grattan (1827)
