= James Middleton (actor) =

Irish stage actor

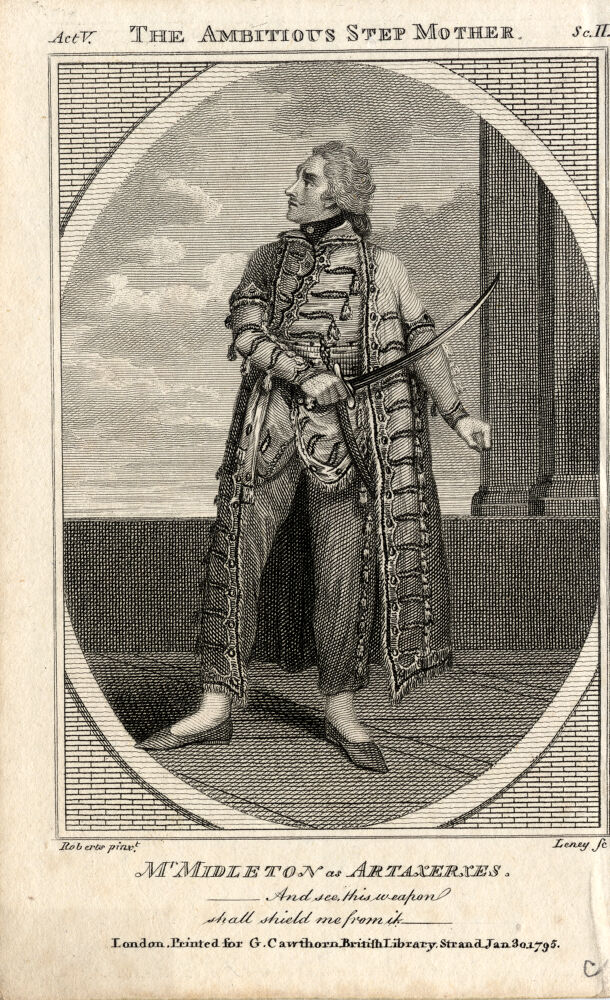
Middleton as Artaxerxes in The Ambitious Stepmother, 1795.

James Middleton (c. 1769 – 1799) was an Irish stage actor. He was born in Dublin as James Magan, the son of a surgeon. He was originally intended for a career in medicine, but chose to take up acting again. He made his debut at the Theatre Royal, Bath on 31 January 1888 in Othello, his voice being compared to Spranger Barry, and adopted his stage name soon afterwards. The same year he appeared at Covent Garden in London but his free-spending and unpredictable behaviour led to him being released at the end of the season. His wife also died around this time, but he rebuilt his career at Crow Street Theatre in his native Dublin and also appeared in Waterford, Cork and Belfast. In 1793 he was rehired by Covent Garden and established himself as a major figure in the company over the following three seasons. However his heavy drinking led to him again being dismissed in 1796, briefly returned to Dublin, and then was engaged at the Theatre Royal, Drury Lane. He died while intoxicated in 1799.

== Selected roles ==
- William Bellevue in The World in a Village by John O'Keeffe (1793)
- Archibald in The Siege of Berwick by Edward Jerningham (1793)
- Sir George Gauntlet in The Rage by Frederick Reynolds (1794)
- Captal De Buche in The Siege of Meaux by Henry James Pye (1794)
- Bloomfield in The Bank Note by William Macready (1795)
- Clement in The Deserted Daughter by Thomas Holcroft (1795)
- William Mareschal in England Preserved by George Watson-Taylor (1795)
- Captain Arable in Speculation by Frederick Reynolds (1795)
- Sir Charles Danvers in Fortune's Fool by Frederick Reynolds (1796)
- Alfred, King of England in The Days of Yore by Richard Cumberland (1796)
- Captain Septimus in The Doldrum by John O'Keeffe (1796)

== Bibliography ==
- Highfill, Philip H, Burnim, Kalman A. & Langhans, Edward A. A Biographical Dictionary of Actors, Actresses, Musicians, Dancers, Managers, and Other Stage Personnel in London, 1660-1800: Volume 10. SIU Press, 1973.
