= Isabella Mattocks =

British actress and singer (1746–1826)

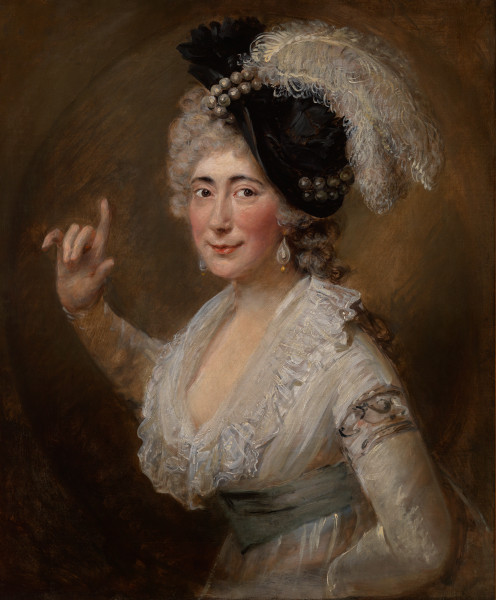
- Isabella Mattocks by Gainsborough Dupont 1833
- Born: Isabella Hallam; 1746; Whitechapel
- Died: June 25, 1826 (aged 79–80); Kensington

Isabella Mattocks (1746 – June 25, 1826) was a British actress and singer.

== Early life ==
Hallam (later Mattocks) was baptised in Whitechapel in 1746 by Lewis and Sarah Hallam. Her father and her uncle William were also actors. Her grandfather Thomas Hallam had been part of the Drury Lane company when he was killed in a dispute with fellow actor Charles Macklin during a performance. When her parents and William decided to try acting in America in 1752 they took three of Isabella's siblings, but she was left in the care of her aunt, Ann, and her husband John Barrington in England.

In 1762 she made her debut in the adult role of Juliet. For most of her childhood except for a few years at school she played small parts in the productions of the Covent Garden company of actors. When she was sixteen she joined the company and in 1765 she married her leading man George Mattocks. Hallam's guardians who she said treated her like true parents opposed the match for reasons that are not certain.

== Career ==
In 1767 she appeared in a revival of Double Falsehood which is a play that claims links to William Shakespeare.

The couple would appear together taking leading roles although Isabella was considered too short for some roles. By the time younger actresses were competing for her roles she was established as a character actor. She was believed to have had an affair with Robert Bensley but her marriage to George survived.

She was known for performing epilogues and these were sometimes written for her by the politician and playwright Miles Peter Andrews. Mattocks was to remain with the Covent garden acting company for 46 years. Thomas Dibdin noted that her last part was on 7 June 1808, noting how long she had amused her audiences. She only daughter who married Nathaniel Huson in 1801. Huson was a barrister who swindled Mattocks out of £6000. However a benefit was staged for her and this replaced over £1000 of what had been lost.

Mattocks died in Kensington in 1826.

== Selected roles ==
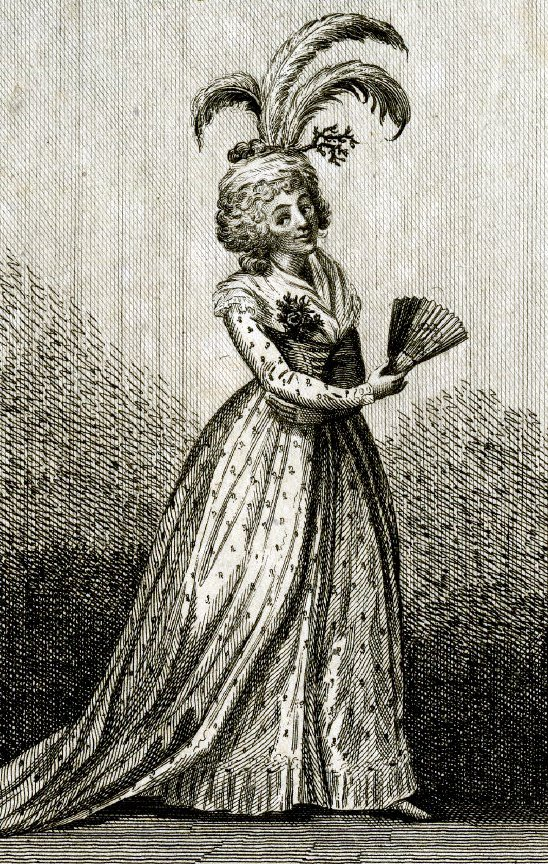
Mattocks as Mrs Warren in Holcroft's The Road to Ruin

- Lucinde in Love in a Village by Isaac Bickerstaffe (1762)
- Emily in The Double Mistake by Elizabeth Griffith (1766)
- Lucy in The Oxonian in Town by George Colman the Elder (1767)
- Olivia in The Good-Natur'd Man by Oliver Goldsmith (1768)
- Aspasia in Cyrus by John Hoole (1768)
- Lucy Waters in The Brothers by Richard Cumberland (1769)
- Donna Louisa in The Duenna by Richard Brinsley Sheridan (1775)
- Daraxa in Edward and Eleonora by James Thomson (1775)
- Lady Racket in Three Weeks After Marriage by Arthur Murphy (1776)
- Lady Bell in Know Your Own Mind by Arthur Murphy (1777)
- Mrs Racket in The Belle's Stratagem by Hannah Cowley (1780)
- Mrs Sparwell in The World as it Goes by Hannah Cowley (1781)
- Sophy Pendragon in Which is the Man? by Hannah Cowley (1782)
- Olivia in A Bold Stroke for a Husband by Hannah Cowley (1783)
- Lady Tremor in Such Things Are by Elizabeth Inchbald (1787)
- Flora in The Midnight Hour by Elizabeth Inchbald (1787)
- Lisette in Animal Magnetism by Elizabeth Inchbald (1788)
- Lady Bonton in The Ton by Eglantine Wallace (1788)
- Marchoiness Merida in The Child of Nature by Elizabeth Inchbald (1788)
- Mrs Wordly in The School for Widows by Richard Cumberland (1789)
- Adelaide in The German Hotel by Thomas Holcroft (1790)
- Lady Peckham in The School for Arrogance by Thomas Holcroft (1791)
- Lauretta in A Day in Turkey by Hannah Cowley (1791)
- Louisa in The Irishman in London by William Macready the Elder (1792)
- Mrs Warren in The Road to Ruin by Thomas Holcroft (1792)
- Mrs Placid in Everyone Has His Fault by Elizabeth Inchbald (1793)
- Lady Sarah Savage in The Rage by Frederick Reynolds (1794)
- Mrs Fancourt in The Town Before You by Hannah Cowley (1794)
- Mrs Allbut in The World in a Village by John O'Keeffe (1793)
- Nanette in Love's Frailties by Thomas Holcroft (1794)
- Mrs Bloomfield in The Bank Note by William Macready the Elder (1795)
- Mrs Sarsnet in The Deserted Daughter by Thomas Holcroft (1795)
- Clementina Allspice in The Way to Get Married by Thomas Morton (1796)
- Miss Union in Fortune's Fool by Frederick Reynolds (1796)
- Mrs Auberne in The Doldrum by John O'Keeffe (1796)
- Miss Vortex in A Cure for the Heart Ache by Thomas Morton (1797)
- Lady Mary Raffle in Wives as They Were and Maids as They Are by Elizabeth Inchbald (1797)
- Mrs Gloomly in Laugh When You Can by Frederick Reynolds (1798)
- Lady Vibrate in He's Much to Blame by Thomas Holcroft (1798)
- Sally in Secrets Worth Knowing by Thomas Morton (1798)
- Fidelia in The Eccentric Lover by Richard Cumberland (1798)
- Lady Maxim in Five Thousand a Year by Thomas John Dibdin (1799)
- Rachel Starch in The Wise Man of the East by Elizabeth Inchbald (1799)
- Lucretia Mactab in The Poor Gentleman by George Colman (1801)
- Mrs Sapling in Delays and Blunders by Frederick Reynolds (1802)
- Camilla in Rugantino by Matthew Lewis (1805)
- Mrs Glastonbury in Who Wants a Guinea? by George Colman the Younger (1805)
- Mrs Trot in Town and Country by Thomas Morton (1807)
