= The Ton =

1788 play

- Original language: English
- Written by: Eglantine Wallace
- Genre: Comedy
- Setting: London, present day

Premiere
- Date: 8 April 1788
- Place: Theatre Royal, Covent Garden, London

The Ton is a 1788 comedy play by the Scottish writer Eglantine Wallace. The title is a reference to the Ton, the fashionable social elite.

It premiered at the Theatre Royal, Covent Garden in London on 8 April 1788. The original cast included Ralph Wewitzer as Lord Bonton, William Farren as Lord Raymond, Alexander Pope as Lord Ormond, Charles Lee Lewes as Captain Daffodil, John Henry Johnstone as MacPharo, Francis Aickin as Villiers, James Fearon as Truffly, John Quick as Ben Levy, Isabella Mattocks as Lady Bonton, Jane Pope as Lady Raymond, Ann Brunton as Lady Clairville, Mary Wells as Clara and Charlotte Morton as Mademoiselle.

== Bibliography ==
- Greene, John C. Theatre in Dublin, 1745-1820: A Calendar of Performances, Volume 6. Lexington Books, 2011.
- Nicoll, Allardyce. A History of English Drama 1660–1900: Volume IV. Cambridge University Press, 2009.
- O'Shaughnessy, David . The Censorship of Eighteenth-Century Theatre: Playhouses and Prohibition, 1737–1843. Cambridge University Press, 2023.
