= Joseph George Holman =

English actor and playwright

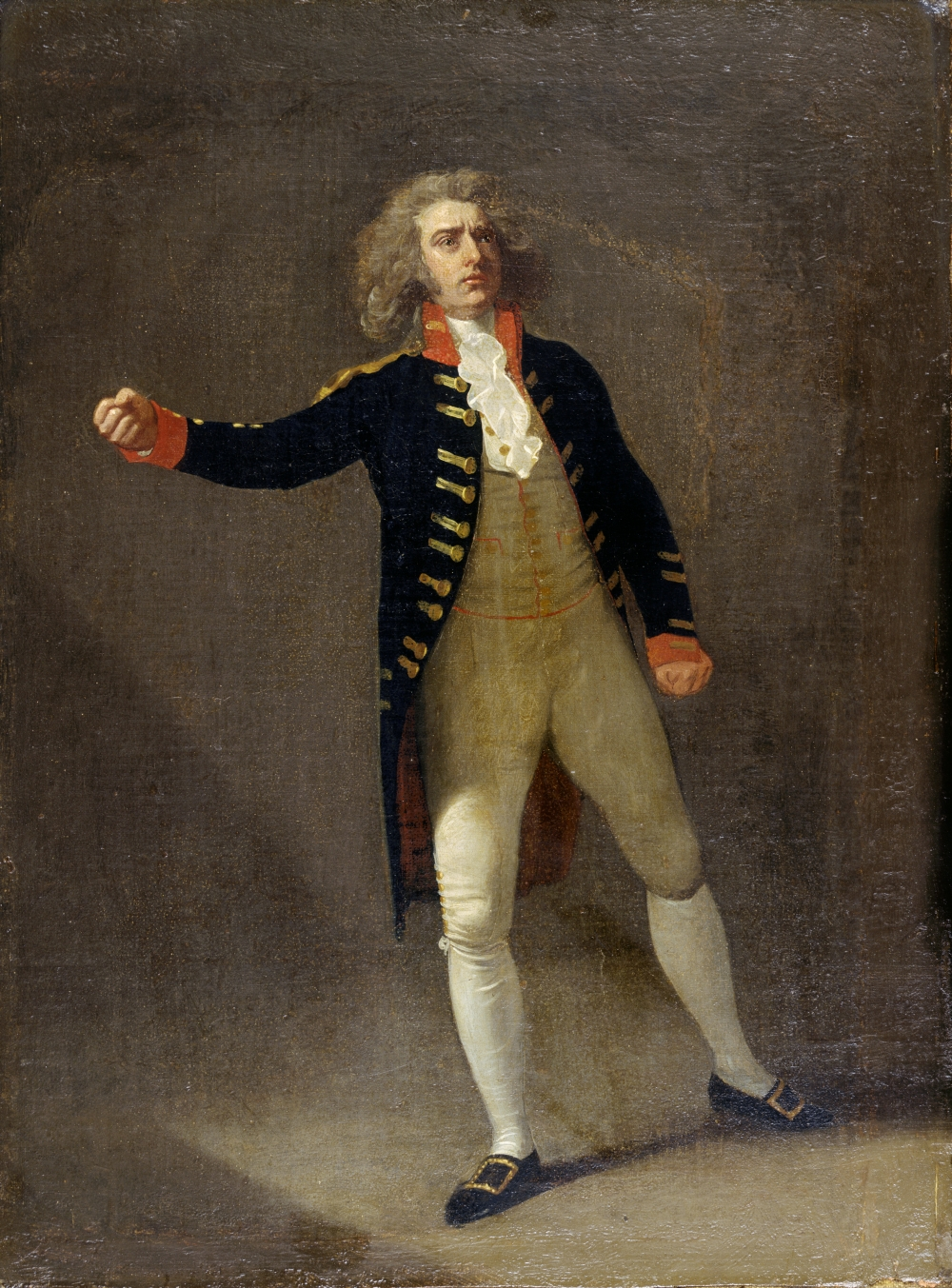
- 1785 painting by Samuel de Wilde
- Born: August 1764
- Died: 24 August 1817 (aged 53); Rockaway, Queens, Long Island, U.S.
- Education: Barwis's school, Soho Square, The Queen's College, Oxford
- Occupations: actor, actor-manager
- Years active: 1784–1815
- Spouse: Jane Hamilton (m.1798 – d.1810)
- Children: Amelia Holman Gilfert
- Father: John Major Holman

Joseph George Holman (1764–1817) was an English actor, dramatist and actor-manager.

== Early life ==
Born in August 1764, he was son of John Major Holman of St. Giles's, Middlesex, an ensign and adjutant in the British service, who died when his son was two years of age. He was placed by an uncle at Barwis's school in Soho Square, where amateur acting was in vogue. With a view to the church as a career, he matriculated 7 February 1783 at The Queen's College, Oxford, but took no degree.

== At Covent Garden ==
On 25 October 1784, at Covent Garden, as Romeo, Holman made his first appearance on the stage. An address was spoken by Thomas Hull, who played Friar Lawrence. Holman's performances were attended by fashionable audiences, and he remained at Covent Garden until 1800. His original characters include Harry Thunder in John O'Keeffe's Wild Oats, 16 April 1791, Harry Dornton in Thomas Holcroft's The Road to Ruin, 18 February 1792, and many parts in plays by Frederick Reynolds, Hannah Cowley, and other dramatists.

At the end of his third season Holman left Covent Garden on a question of terms. He acted in Dublin and in English and Scottish towns, but soon returned to Covent Garden.

In the season of 1799–1800 a serious quarrel took place between the proprietors of Covent Garden and eight of the principal actors. A pamphlet A Statement of the Differences subsisting between the Proprietors and Performers of the Theatre Royal Covent Garden was published in 1800, and went through several editions: its authorship was attributed to Holman. The actors objected to restrictions on their power of giving orders for admission, and to change in the charges for benefits and the amount of fines for the refusal of a character. The Lord Chamberlain's verdict was hostile to the actors, and there was a public row. Seven actors accepted the decision and remained at Covent Garden. Holman either resigned or was dismissed.

== Later life ==
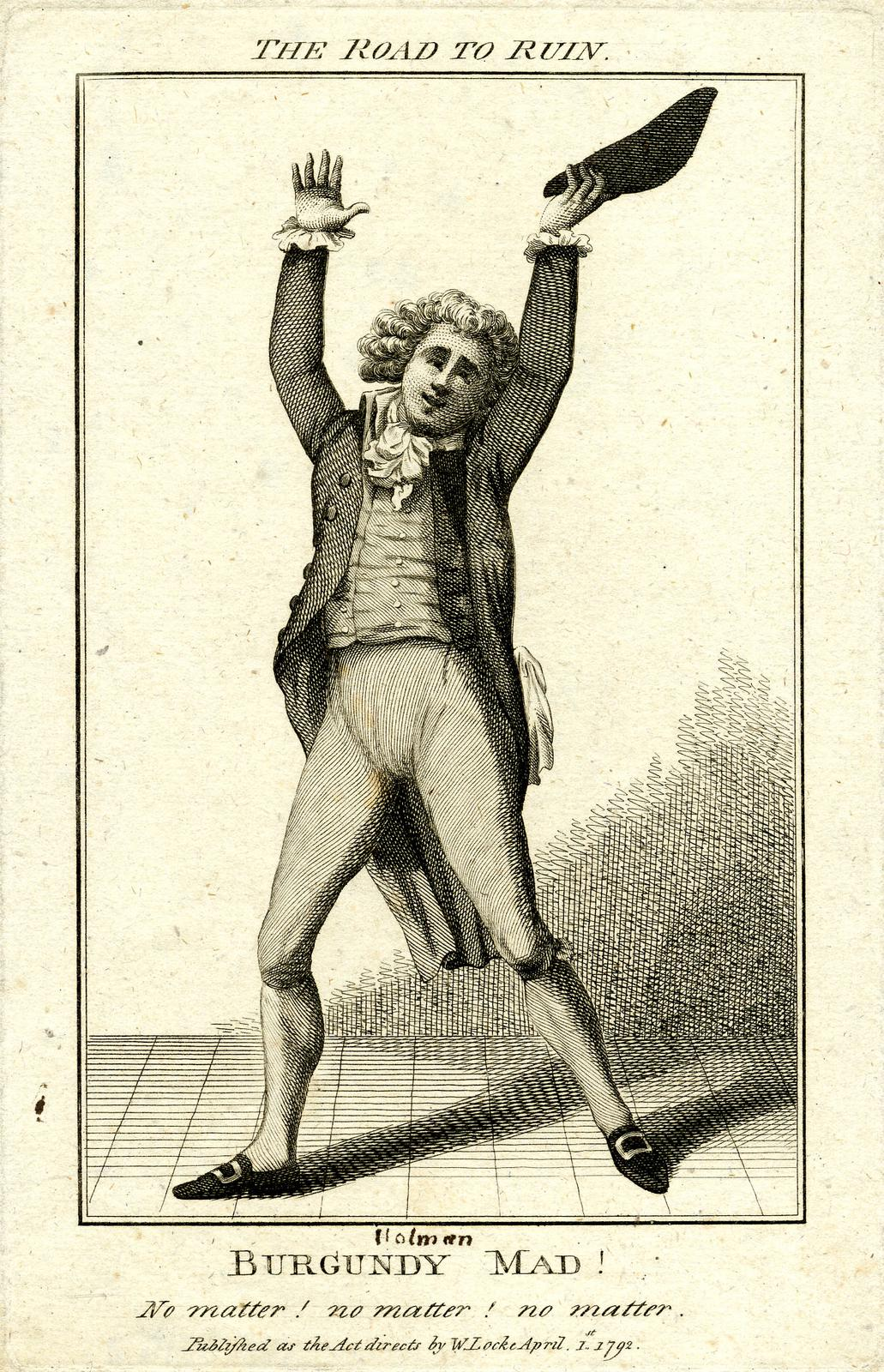
Holman depicted in Thomas Holcroft's The Road to Ruin

Holman appeared a few times at the Haymarket Theatre, (located at 18 Suffolk St, London SW1Y 4HT, UK) where he produced his What a Blunder, a comic opera in three acts, in which he was Count Alphonso d'Esparza. Holman went to Dublin, where he took for a time a share with Frederick Edward Jones in the management. He then took to farming.

On 31 July 1806 Holman played in Dublin for his benefit Antony in All for Love, by John Dryden, to the Ventidius of Thomas Potter Cooke. On 22 August 1812, as Jaffier in Thomas Otway's Venice Preserved, he reappeared at the Haymarket after eleven years' absence; and played a few further parts.

In 1812 Holman and his daughter Amelia performed at the Theatre-Royal, Covent Garden and then performed opposite each other in the provinces. Both were at the Georgian Theatre, Wisbech (now the Angles Theatre) run by Thomas Shaftoe Robertson in April, 1812. On 8th he played Rolla in Kotzebue's Pizarro, on 10th Othello in Shakespeare's play and on 11th (their last night) Macbeth in Macbeth, King of Scotland. The handbills for these plays are amongst the hundreds held in the collection of the Wisbech & Fenland Museum.

Holman went to America in 1812, and took with him Amelia, his daughter, who played in New York, Lady Townly in The Provoked Husband to his Lord Townly, and supported him throughout his American career. In a letter of introduction he took out he is described as a fellow of Queen's College. In 1813 Holman and Miss Holman played at the Chestnut Street Theatre, Philadelphia. He undertook the management of the Walnut Street Theatre in the city, and failed there.

Holman then (1815) managed Charleston Theatre in Charleston, South Carolina, he went to England for additional performers, returned and married Mary Sarah Latimer (1797-1859), a singer in 1817. He died, according to one account, of apoplexy at Rockaway on Long Island, on 24 August 1817, and, according to another, of yellow fever.

== Works ==
His dramatic works consist of:

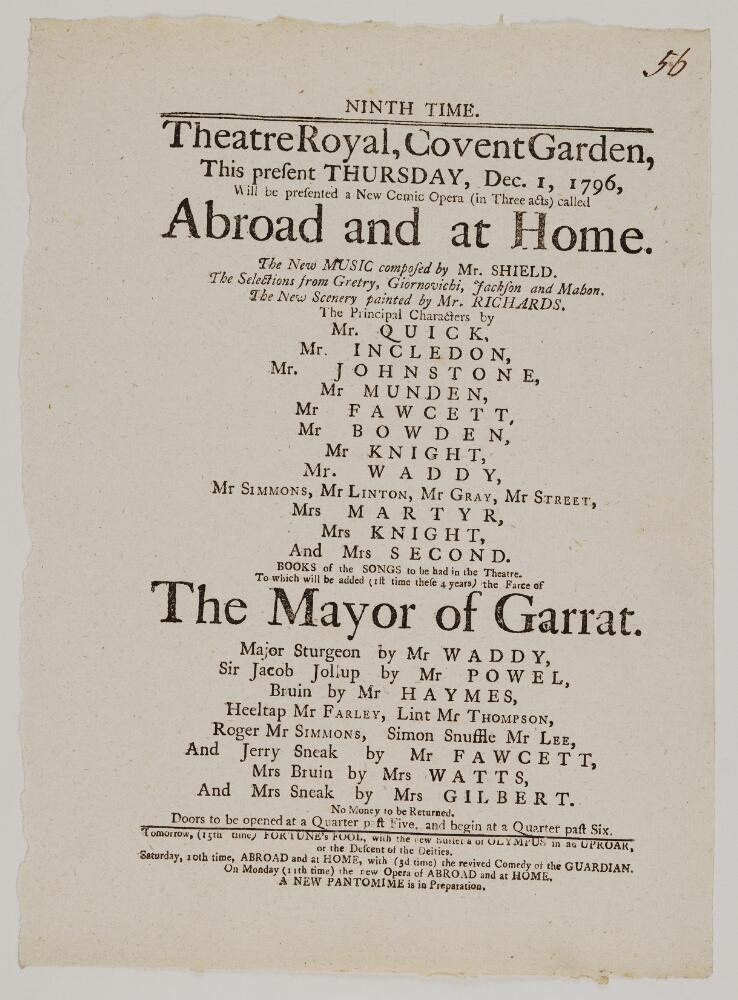
Playbill of Covent Garden, Thursday, Dec. 1, 1796, "Abroad and at home" including Mr and Mrs Knight

- Abroad and at Home, 1796, a comic opera in three acts, originally called The King's Bench, but the licenser objected to the title. It was acted 29 times, twice printed in the same year, and acted frequently in England and America.
- Red Cross Knights, in five acts, 1799; Haymarket, 21 August 1799. This is taken from Schiller's The Robbers, a translation of which by Holman was refused by the licenser.
- The Votary of Wealth, 1799; Covent Garden, 12 January 1799; a comedy.
- What a Blunder, 1800; Haymarket, 14 August 1800, and Covent Garden, 31 May 1803; a comic opera in three acts.
- Love gives the Alarm, a comedy given once at Covent Garden, 23 February 1804, a failure, and never printed.
- The Gazette Extraordinary, Covent Garden, 23 April 1811; a comedy.

Holman only acted in one of his own plays.

== Family ==
In 1798 Holman married Jane, youngest daughter of the Hon. and Rev. Frederick Hamilton, a direct descendant of the Duke of Hamilton. She died June 11, 1810. He was the father of Amelia Holman Gilfert.

== Selected roles ==
- Werter in Werter by Frederick Reynolds (1786)
- Villiers in Eloisa by Frederick Reynolds (1786)
- Elvirus in Such Things Are by Elizabeth Inchbald (1787)
- O'Donovan in The Toy by John O'Keeffe (1789)
- Harry Neville in The Dramatist by Frederick Reynolds (1789)
- Dorville in The German Hotel by Thomas Holcroft (1790)
- Young Bramin in The Widow of Malabar by Mariana Starke (1790)
- Ibrahim in A Day in Turkey by Hannah Cowley (1791)
- Harry in Wild Oats by John O'Keeffe (1791)
- Alonzo in Columbus by Thomas Morton (1792)
- Harry Dornton in The Road to Ruin by Thomas Holcroft (1792)
- Valentine in The Siege of Berwick by Edward Jerningham (1793)
- Charles in The World in a Village by John O'Keeffe (1793)
- Conway in The Town Before You by Hannah Cowley (1794)
- Earl of Douglas in The Siege of Meaux by Henry James Pye (1794)
- Charles Seymour in Love's Frailties by Thomas Holcroft (1794)
- Sir Charles Leslie in The Bank Note by William Macready (1795)
- Earl of Surrey in England Preserved by George Watson-Taylor (1795)
- Algernon in False Impressions by Richard Cumberland (1797)
- Egerton in Secrets Worth Knowing by Thomas Holcroft (1798)
- Mortimer in Laugh When You Can by Frederick Reynolds (1798)
- Fenton in The Eccentric Lover by Richard Cumberland (1798)
- Lazarra in Joanna of Montfaucon by Richard Cumberland (1800)

== Notes ==
Attribution

This article incorporates text from a publication now in the public domain: Lee, Sidney, ed. (1891). "Holman, Joseph George". Dictionary of National Biography. Vol. 27. London: Smith, Elder & Co.
