= The Dramatist =

1789 play by Frederick Reynolds

- Original language: English
- Written by: Frederick Reynolds
- Genre: Comedy
- Setting: Bath, present day

Premiere
- Date: 15 May 1789
- Place: Theatre Royal, Covent Garden, London

The Dramatist: Or, Stop Him who Can! is a 1789 comedy play by the British writer Frederick Reynolds. It premiered at the Theatre Royal, Covent Garden on 15 May 1789. The original cast included John Quick as Lord Scratch, Joseph George Holman as Harry Neville, William Blanchard as Floriville, William Macready as Willoughby, Joseph Shepherd Munden as Ennui, James Thompson as Peter, William Thomas Lewis as Vapid, Ann Brunton as Louisa Courtney, Lydia Webb as Lady Waitfor't and Mary Wells as Marianne.

== Bibliography ==
- Greene, John C. Theatre in Dublin, 1745-1820: A Calendar of Performances, Volume 6. Lexington Books, 2011.
- Nicoll, Allardyce. A History of English Drama 1660–1900: Volume IV. Cambridge University Press, 2009.
