= The Road to Ruin (play) =

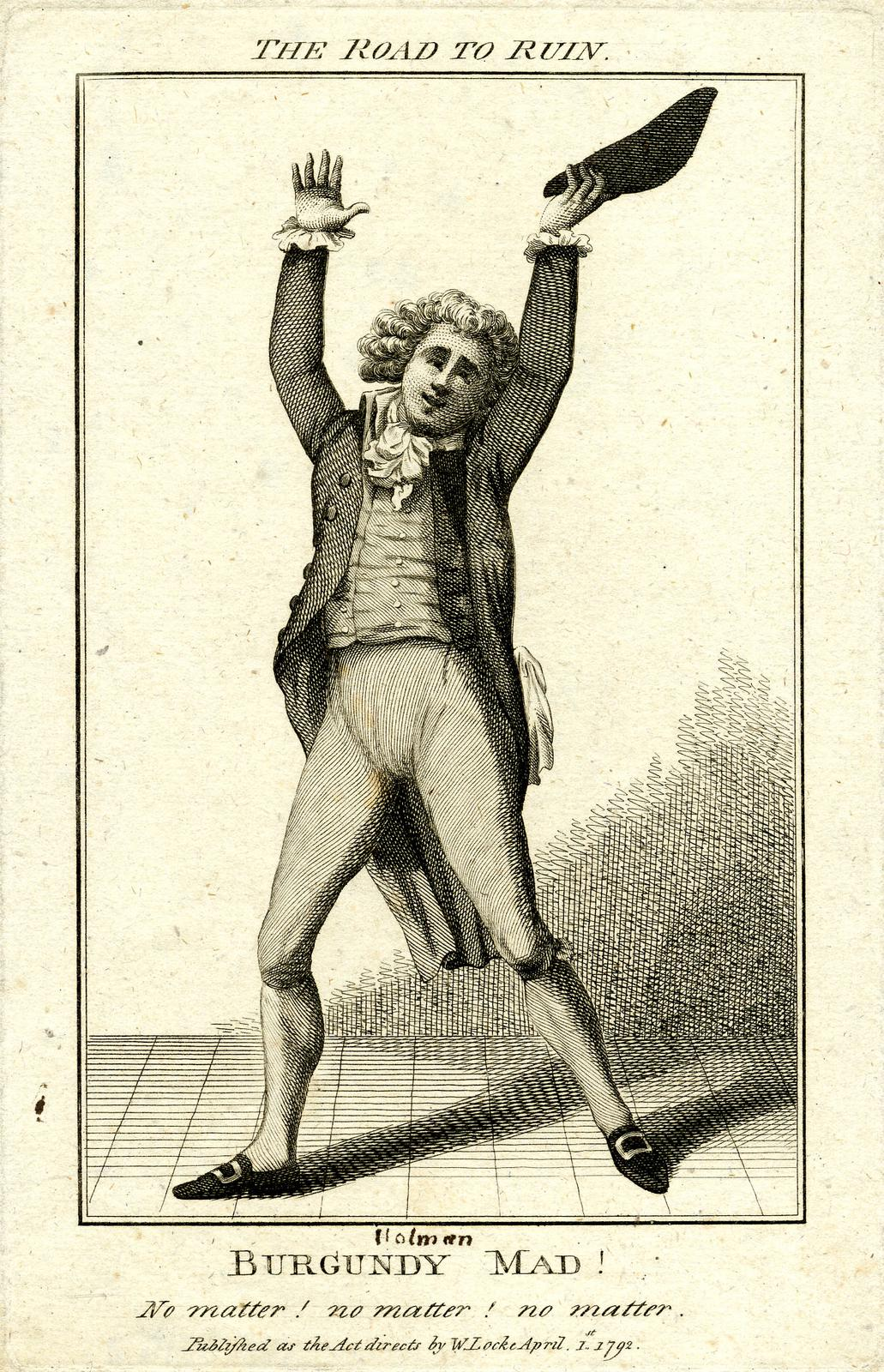
- Original language: English
- Written by: Thomas Holcroft
- Genre: Comedy

Premiere
- Date: 18 February 1792
- Place: Covent Garden Theatre, London

The Road to Ruin is a 1792 comedy play by the British writer Thomas Holcroft.

It premiered at Covent Garden in London with a cast that featured William Thomas Lewis as Goldfinch, John Quick as Mr Silky, Joseph George Holman as Harry Dornton, Richard Wilson as Mr Sulky, Joseph Shepherd Munden as Mr Dornton, George Davies Harley as Mr Milford, James Thompson as Sheriff's Officer, William Macready as Hosier, Ann Brunton Merry as Sophia, Sarah Harlowe as Jenny and Isabella Mattocks as Mrs Warren.

== Bibliography ==
- Nicoll, Allardyce. A History of English Drama 1660–1900: Volume III. Cambridge University Press, 2009.
- Hogan, C.B (ed.) The London Stage, 1660–1800: Volume V. Southern Illinois University Press, 1968.
