= The Days of Yore =

1796 play

- Original language: English
- Written by: Richard Cumberland
- Genre: Historical

Premiere
- Date: 13 January 1796
- Place: Covent Garden Theatre, London

The Days of Yore is a British historical play by Richard Cumberland. It was first staged at the Covent Garden Theatre on 13 January 1796. The original cast included James Middleton as Alfred, King of England, George Davies Harley as Oddune, Earl of Devonshire, Alexander Pope as Voltimar, Elizabeth Clendining as Lothaire, James Thompson as Mollo, Willam Macready as Sibald, William Claremont as Ebert, Thomas Hull as Roger De Malvern and Elizabeth Pope as Adela. The work is set in the Anglo-Saxon era. The work was possibly influenced by Horace Walpole's gothic novel The Mysterious Mother. It ran for five performances.

== Bibliography ==
- Chew, Samuel C. & Altick, Richard Daniel. A Literary History of England, Volume IV: The Nineteenth Century and After. Meredith Publishing Company, 1967.
- Frank, Frederick S (ed.). The Castle of Otranto and The Mysterious Mother. Broadview Press, 2003.
- Watson, George. The New Cambridge Bibliography of English Literature: Volume 2, 1660-1800. Cambridge University Press, 1971.
