= William Claremont =

British stage actor

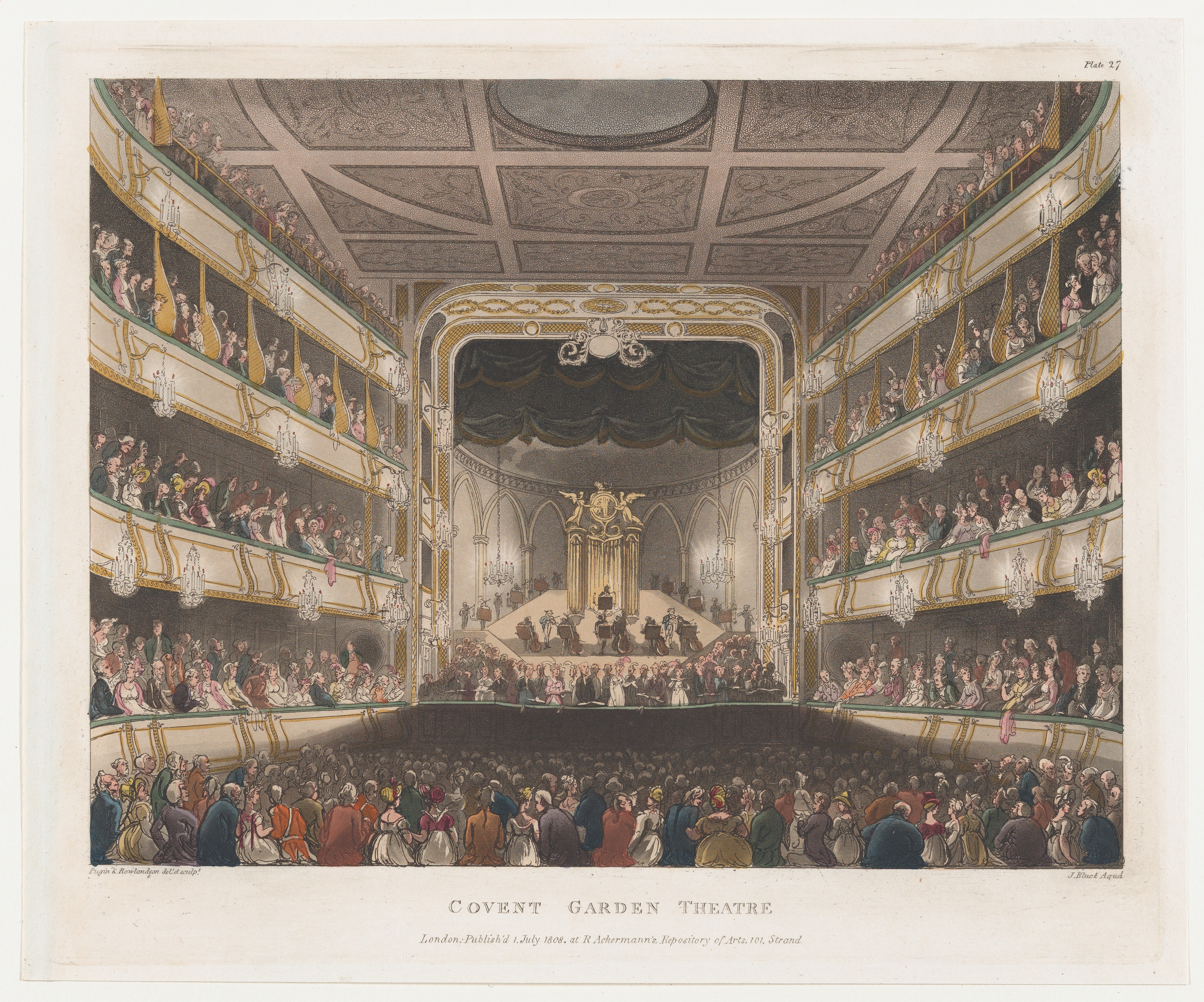
Claremont began his career at Covent Garden and acted there for a number of years.

William Claremont (died 1832) was a British stage actor who spent many years in the companies of the leading London theatres at Covent Garden, Haymarket and Drury Lane. He was born William Cleaver in London as the son of a shop assistant and a deliveryman and was originally apprenticed to a linen merchant. His first known acting roles were in Margate in 1792 and from 1793 he was a regular at Covent Garden. During the summers he also appeared at Richmond and Birmingham. He continued at Covent Garden until 1805 when he switched to Drury Lane and remained there until 1822.

== Selected roles ==
- Conrade in Much Ado About Nothing by William Shakespeare (1793)
- Sir Fred Faintly in Speculation by Frederick Reynolds (1795)
- Vicomte de Beaumont in England Preserved by George Watson-Taylor (1795)
- Ebert in The Days of Yore by Richard Cumberland (1796)
- Mountaineer in Joanna of Montfaucon by Richard Cumberland (1800)
- Gomez in Alfonso, King of Castile by Matthew Lewis (1801)
- Dorville in The Delinquent by Frederick Reynolds (1805)
- Count Zulmio in Edgar by George Manners (1806)
- Villager in The Vespers of Palermo by Felicia Hemans (1823)
- Tentile in Cortez by James Planché (1823)
- Weilberg in The Three Strangers by Harriet Lee (1825)

== Bibliography ==
- Highfill, Philip H, Burnim, Kalman A. & Langhans, Edward A. A Biographical Dictionary of Actors, Actresses, Musicians, Dancers, Managers and Other Stage Personnel in London, 1660-1800: Cabanel to Cory. SIU Press, 1975.
