= Columbus (play) =

1792 play

- Written by: Thomas Morton
- Original language: English
- Genre: Historical
- Setting: New World, 1492

Premiere
- Date premiered: 1 December 1792
- Place premiered: Theatre Royal, Covent Garden, London

Columbus: Or, A world Discovered is a 1792 historical play by the British writer Thomas Morton. His first play, it was staged at the Theatre Royal, Covent Garden on 1 December 1792. The original cast included Alexander Pope as Christopher Columbus, Joseph George Holman as Alonzo, William Thomas Lewis as Harry Herbert, John Quick as Doctor Dolores, Joseph Shepherd Munden as Bribon, William Macready as Roldan, James Thompson as Valverdo, William Cubitt as Moscoso, Charles Farley as Captain, William Farren as Orozimbo, George Davies Harley as Solasco, Jane Pope as Cora and Harriet Pye Esten as Nelti. The Irish premiere took place at the Crow Street Theatre in Dublin on 10 July 1793.

== Bibliography ==
- Greene, John C. Theatre in Dublin, 1745-1820: A Calendar of Performances, Volume 6. Lexington Books, 2011.
- Nicoll, Allardyce. A History of English Drama 1660–1900: Volume IV. Cambridge University Press, 2009.
