= Fortune's Fool =

Fortune's Fool may refer to:

- Fortune's Fool (novel)
- Fortune's Fool (1796 play), a comedy play by Frederick Reynolds
- Fortune's Fool (1848 play), a play by Ivan Turgenev
- Fortune's Fool (1897 play), a play by Alfred Dampier
