= Notoriety (play) =

1791 play

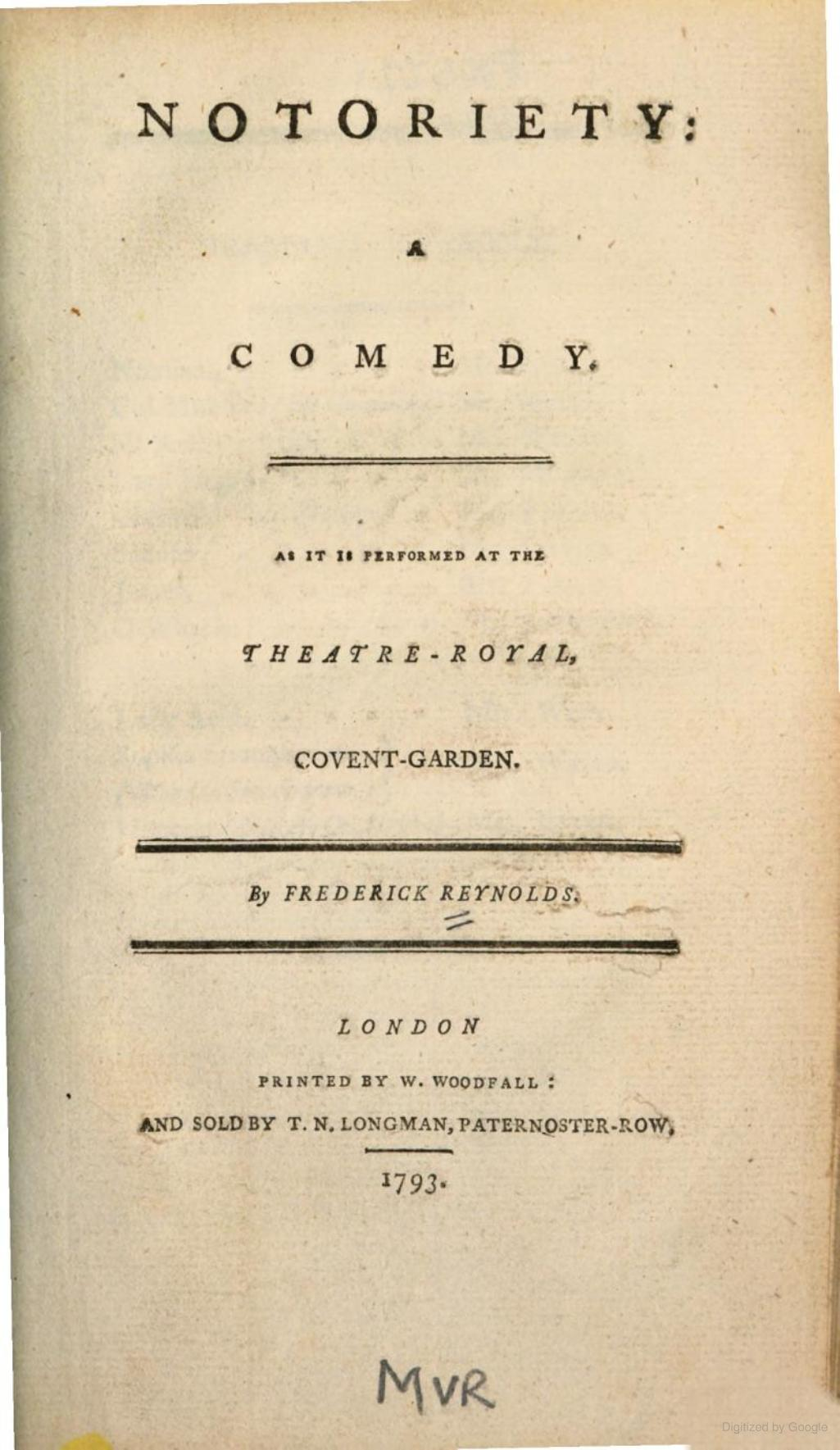
- Written by: Frederick Reynolds
- Original language: English
- Genre: Comedy
- Setting: London, present day

Premiere
- Date premiered: 5 November 1791
- Place premiered: Theatre Royal, Covent Garden, London

Notoriety is a 1791 comedy play by the British writer Frederick Reynolds. It premiered at the Theatre Royal, Covent Garden on in London on 5 November 1791. The original cast included William Thomas Lewis as Nominal, John Quick as Colonel Hubbub, Richard Wilson as Sir Andrew Acid, Joseph Shepherd Munden as Lord Jargon, William Farren as Clairville, Charles Farley as James, John Henry Johnstone as O'Whack, Mrs Webb as Lady Acid, Mary Wells as Sophia Strangways and Harriet Pye Esten as Honoria.

== Bibliography ==
- Class, Monika & Robinson, Terry F. Transnational England: Home and Abroad, 1780-1860. Cambridge Scholars Publishing, 2009.
- Greene, John C. Theatre in Dublin, 1745-1820: A Calendar of Performances, Volume 6. Lexington Books, 2011.
- Nicoll, Allardyce. A History of English Drama 1660–1900: Volume IV. Cambridge University Press, 2009.
