= William Farren (actor, born 1754) =

English stage actor (1754–1795)

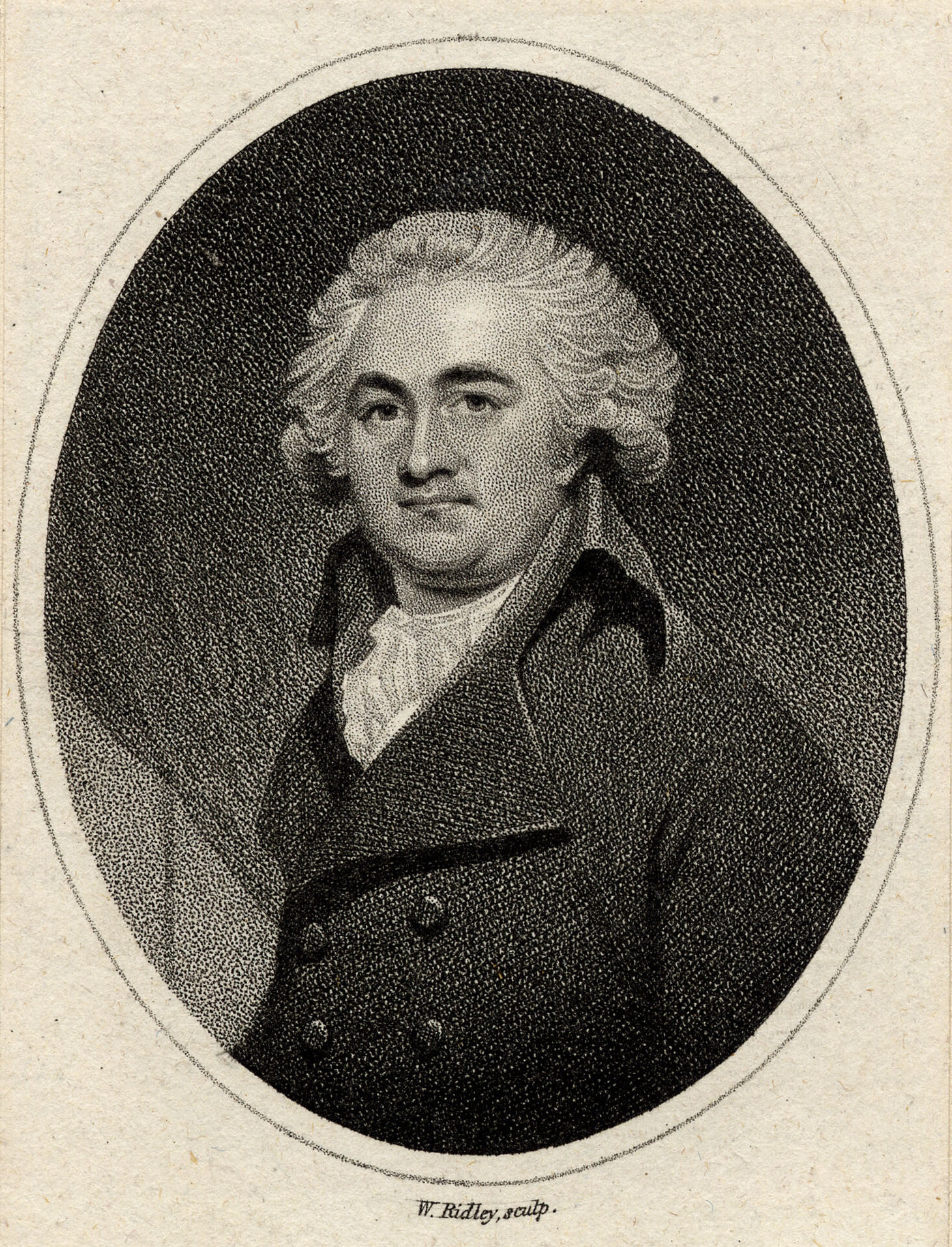
Farren in 1793

William Farren (1754–1795) was an English stage actor of the eighteenth century. He was born in London to a chandler from Clerkenwell. He made his debut at the Theatre Royal, Drury Lane in London in 1775, likely due to the influence of the actor Richard Yates and remained there until 1784 when he transferred to the rival Theatre Royal, Covent Garden. A notable early role at Drury Lane was the original Careless in Sheridan's The School for Scandal. He remained at Covent Garden until his death in 1795, making occasional summer appearances at the Haymarket. He played a mixture of supporting roles and occasional leads, and developed a reputation as a versatile actor who could appear in comedy and tragedy. He died of pneumonia and was buried at St Paul's Church in Covent Garden. His son William Farren also became an actor, and the father is sometimes known as William Farren the Elder to distinguish him.

== Selected roles ==
- Carless in The School for Scandal by Richard Brinsley Sheridan (1777)
- Alcander in The Royal Suppliants by John Delap (1781)
- Mandeville in He Would Be a Soldier by Frederick Pilon (1786)
- Hainhault in Eloisa by Frederick Reynolds (1786)
- Albert in Werter by Frederick Reynolds (1786)
- Sir William Caroll in All on a Summer's Day by Elizabeth Inchbald (1787)
- Sultan in Such Things Are by Elizabeth Inchbald (1787)
- Lord Raymond in The Ton by Eglantine Wallace (1788)
- Marquis Almanza in The Child of Nature by Elizabeth Inchbald (1788)
- Baron Thorck in The German Hotel by Thomas Holcroft (1790)
- Raymond in The Widow of Malabar by Mariana Starke (1790)
- Orloff in A Day in Turkey by Hannah Cowley (1791)
- Edmundin The School for Arrogance by Thomas Holcroft (1791)
- Ribaumont in The Surrender of Calais by George Colman the Younger (1791)
- Clairville in Notoriety by Frederick Reynolds (1791)
- Orozimbo in Columbus by Thomas Morton (1792)
- Lord Norland in Everyone Has His Fault by Elizabeth Inchbald (1793)
- Sir Charles Dazzle in How to Grow Rich by Frederick Reynolds (1793)
- Duke of Orleans in The Siege of Meaux by Henry James Pye (1794)
- Earl of Chester in England Preserved by George Watson-Taylor (1795)

== Bibliography ==
- Burnim, Kalman A. & Highfill, Philip H. John Bell, Patron of British Theatrical Portraiture: A Catalog of the Theatrical Portraits in His Editions of Bell's Shakespeare and Bell's British Theatre. SIU Press, 1998.
- Straub, Kristina, G. Anderson, Misty and O'Quinn, Daniel . The Routledge Anthology of Restoration and Eighteenth-Century Drama. Taylor & Francis, 2017.
