= Richard Wilson (stage actor) =

English stage actor

Richard Wilson (1744–1796) was an English stage actor. He was born in Durham. After featuring in provincial theatre in Northern England and Scotland he appeared as King Lear at the Theatre Royal, Edinburgh in 1772, gaining a reputation thereafter for performing in comedies. In 1775 he joined the company of the Theatre Royal, Covent Garden in London and performed there and at the Haymarket on and off for the remainder of his career. In 1795 he was imprisoned for debt at the King's Bench Prison in Southwark and died the following year. His wife was the actress Sarah Maria Wilson.

== Selected roles ==
- Governor Harcourt in The Chapter of Accidents by Sophia Lee (1780)
- Sir Hornet Armstrong in Duplicity by Thomas Holcroft (1781)
- Colonel Sparwell in The World as it Goes by Hannah Cowley (1783)
- Evergreen in More Ways Than One by Hannah Cowley (1783)
- Gasper in A Bold Stroke for a Husband by Hannah Cowley (1783)
- Priest in The Fate of Sparta by Hannah Cowley (1788)
- Servant in The Regent by Bertie Greatheed (1788)
- Rummer in The German Hotel by Thomas Holcroft (1790)
- Sir Andrew Acid in Notoriety by Frederick Reynolds (1791)
- Sir Paul Peckham in The School for Arrogance by Thomas Holcroft (1791)
- John Dory in Wild Oats by John O'Keeffe (1791)
- Mr Sulky in The Road to Ruin by Thomas Holcroft (1792)
- Sir Charles Cullender in Cross Partners by Elizabeth Inchbald (1792)

== Bibliography ==
- Cox, Jeffrey N. & Gamer, Michael. The Broadview Anthology of Romantic Drama. Broadview Press, 2003.
- Highfill, Philip H, Burnim, Kalman A. & Langhans, Edward A. A Biographical Dictionary of Actors, Actresses, Musicians, Dancers, Managers & Other Stage Personnel in London, 1660–1800, Volume 13. SIU Press, 1993.
