= A Day in Turkey =

1791 play

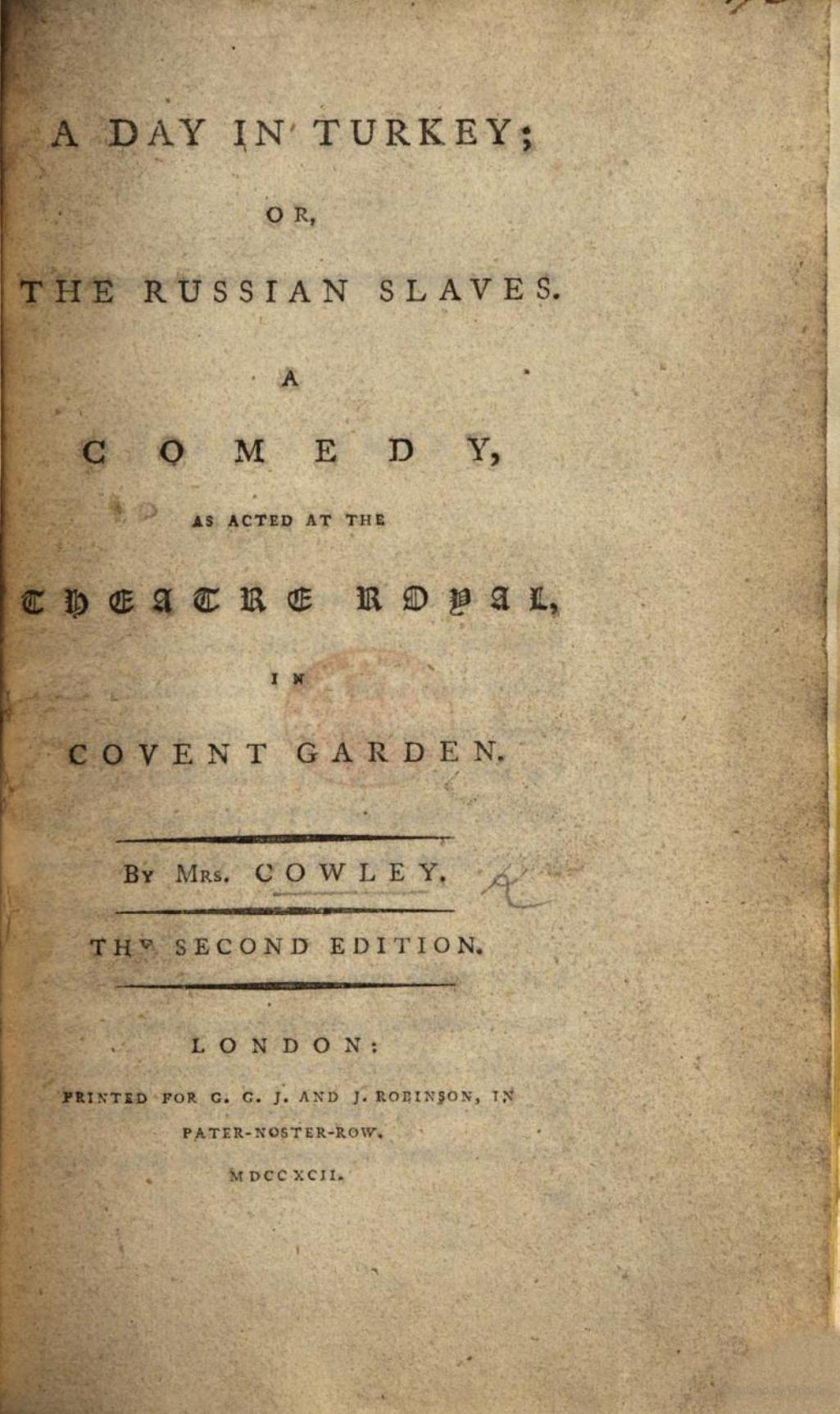
- Written by: Hannah Cowley
- Original language: English
- Genre: Comedy
- Setting: Ottoman Empire

Premiere
- Date premiered: 3 December 1791
- Place premiered: Theatre Royal, Covent Garden, London

A Day in Turkey is a 1791 comedy by the English author Hannah Cowley. It premiered at the Theatre Royal, Covent Garden in London on 3 December 1791. The original cast included Joseph George Holman as Ibrahim, William Farren as Orloff, John Fawcett as A La Greque, Joseph Shepherd Munden as Mustapha, William Cubitt as Azim, Charles Incledon as Selim, William Macready as Muley, Charles Farley as Ismael, James Thompson as Old Man, Jane Pope as Alexina, Harriet Pye Esten as Paulina, Isabella Mattocks as Lauretta and Margaret Martyr as Fatima. The Irish premiere took place at the Crow Street Theatre in Dublin on 16 May 1792

== Bibliography ==
- Escott, Angela. The Celebrated Hannah Cowley: Experiments in Dramatic Genre, 1776–1794. Routledge, 2015.
- Greene, John C. Theatre in Dublin, 1745-1820: A Calendar of Performances, Volume 6. Lexington Books, 2011.
- Nicoll, Allardyce. A History of English Drama 1660–1900: Volume III. Cambridge University Press, 2009.
- Hogan, C.B (ed.) The London Stage, 1660–1800: Volume V. Southern Illinois University Press, 1968.
