= The Siege of Berwick =

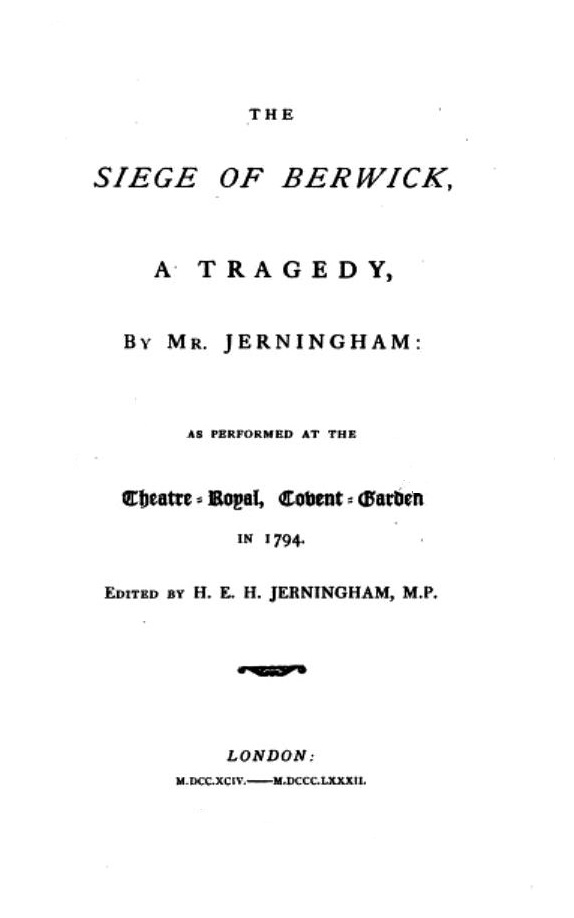
- Title page of the play's 1882 edition
- Original language: English
- Written by: Edward Jerningham
- Genre: Tragedy

Premiere
- Date: 13 November 1793
- Place: Covent Garden Theatre, London

The Siege of Berwick is a four-act verse tragedy by Edward Jerningham, acted in 1793 and published the following year. The text was republished in the third volume of Jerningham’s Poems and Plays (1806) and then in a separate edition as The Siege of Berwick: a tragedy by Mr Jerningham as performed at the Theatre Royal, Covent Garden, edited by his great grand-nephew Hubert Jerningham in 1882. The subject concerns a supposed incident during the English invasion of Scotland in 1333. Though the play is of historical interest, it was not a critical success.

The original production of The Siege of Berwick opened at Covent Garden Theatre on 13 November 1793. The cast featured Alexander Pope as Sir Alexander Seaton, Governor of the town; Joseph George Holman and James Middleton as his sons Valentine and Archibald; George Davies Harley as the monk Anselm; and William Macready as the army officer Donaldson. The female leads were Mrs Elizabeth Pope as Seaton's wife Ethelberta and Susan Fawcett as her companion Juliana. The play was only acted on five nights before Mrs Pope's illness forced its cancellation. In the following year there were additional performances at York Theatre Royal on 11 February and a benefit performance there on 3 May.

It was noted at the time that Jerningham, who had the reputation of a literary magpie, was indebted for elements in his plot to John Home's 1760 drama, The Siege of Aquileia. The claim was also made later that Home had based the action of his play on the Berwick incident in the first place, as Felicia Hemans was to do again in her Siege of Valencia (1823), equally dealing with a contemporary mediaeval conflict.

== Plot ==
At the start of the play, Seaton is refusing to surrender the fortified town to the English besiegers. His sons make a sally against them, but are captured. The enemy commander then sends them to Seaton with a message that if he does not yield, one of them will be chained to a pillar and exposed to the arrows shot from the walls. Both of them, however, resolve to return to the enemy camp together. Ethelberta then goes to the English commander, accompanied by Anselm, and makes an unsuccessful plea that her sons should be spared. During the subsequent attack on the town walls, the invaders are driven back and Seaton kills their commander. Afterwards the sons are rescued by Donaldson unharmed.

== Response ==
The Siege of Berwick was performed on the back of a patriotic response to the War of the First Coalition and The Times commented approvingly on the following day on the defiant spirit of its epilogue. There Mrs Pope answers criticism of the choice of a historical subject by pointing to its exemplary effect in the present:

Ev'n here, as I the martial theme pursue,
Full many a mother rises to my view,
Whose ardent Sons domestic comforts fly,
To seek th'advancing Foe with kindling eye.

But while the performance may then have been greeted with indulgence, following the argument that "the critics' function was no longer to assess new works objectively, but to proselytize on behalf of the national good", no such quarter was given later in reviews of the printed text. The Critical Review considered the plot meagre and the versification defective. The Monthly Review likewise found the verse little better than cut-up prose and the action unfinished, as did The British Critic. A literary historian has treated the work no better, Allardyce Nicoll finding it "a wretched production in which pseudo-classic propriety mingles with turgid diction".

== Bibliography ==
- Genest, John. Some Account of the English Stage: From the Restoration in 1660 to 1830, H.E. Carrington, 1832, Volume 7, pp.156-7
- Hogan, C.B (ed.) The London Stage, 1660–1800: Volume V. Southern Illinois University Press, 1968
- Jerningham, Edward. The Siege of Berwick, 18th century collections online
- Jerningham, H. E. H. The Siege of Berwick, 1882 edition, Google Books
