= The Town Before You =

1794 play

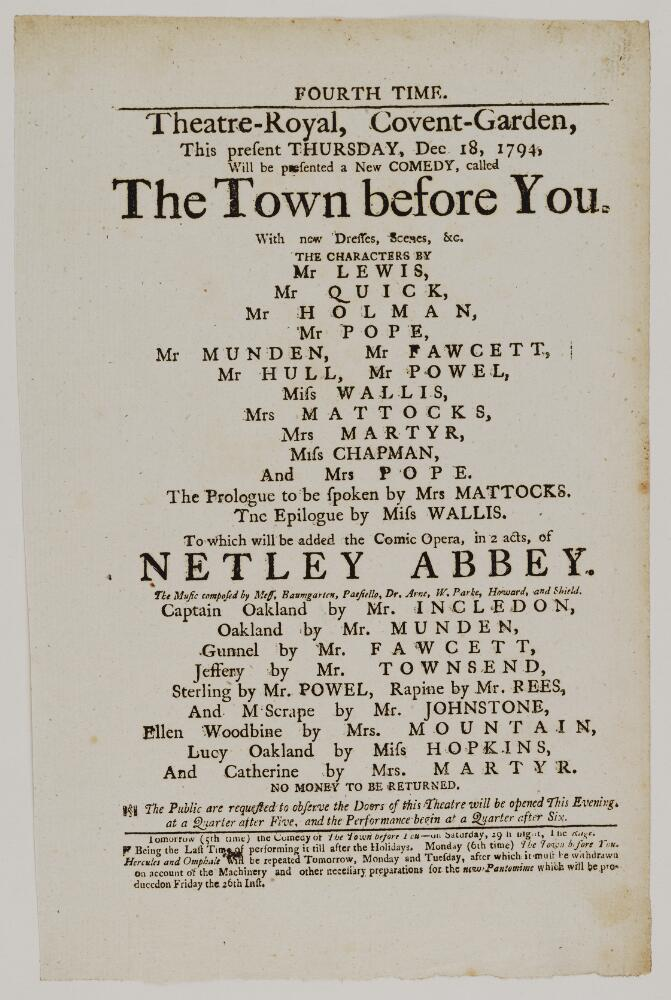
- A playbill dated 18 December 1794 announcing the play
- Original language: English
- Written by: Hannah Cowley
- Genre: Comedy

Premiere
- Date: 6 December 1794
- Place: Covent Garden Theatre, London

The Town before You, a Comedy, as Acted at the Theatre-Royal, Covent-Garden
- Author: Hannah Cowley
- Language: English
- Publisher: Printed by George Woodfall for Thomas Norton Longman
- Publication date: 1795
- Publication place: London
- Pages: 104
- OCLC: 2152182

The Town Before You is a 1794 comedy play by the British writer Hannah Cowley, first published in 1795.

The original cast included William Thomas Lewis as Tippy, John Quick as Sir Robert Floyer, Joseph George Holman as Conway, Alexander Pope as Asgill, Joseph Shepherd Munden as Humphrey, John Fawcett as Fancourt, John Bernard as Acid, Thomas Hull as Perkins, James Thompson as Slopseller, Samuel Simmons as Sir Robert's Servant, Charlotte Chapman as Lady Charlotte and Isabella Mattocks as Mrs Fancourt, Margaret Martyr as Jenny and Jane Pope as Lady Horatia Horton.

== Summary ==
Sir Robert Floyer, Mr. Quick; sir Simon Asgill, Mr. Powell; Asgill, Mr. Pope; Conway, Mr. Holman; Fancourt, Mr. Munden; Tippy, Mr. Lewish; Acid, Mr. Bernard; Humphrey, Mr. Fawcett. Lady Horatia, Mrs. Pope; lady Charlotte, Miss Chapman; lady Elisabeth, Miss Hopkins; Georgina, Miss Wallis; Mrs. Fancourt, Mrs. Mattocks; Mrs. Clement, Mrs. Platt; Jenny, Mrs. Martyr.

Sir Robert Floyer, a Welch knight, weak, vain, ostentatious, but generous, spirited, and tenderly attached to his daughter, Georgina, comes to town on the invitation of the county member, with the view of getting a place. He prides himself much upon having been high sheriff of the county, on which occasion he was knighted.

Fancourt and Tippy are two swindlers, the former a scholar, who has spent all his wife's fortune, and uses her extremely ill; the other a man of genius, but whose best fortune it is to bear an exact similitude to a peer, and who being often mistaken for his lordship, turns the resemblance to his own advantage. These sharpers lay their snares for the Welch knight; and their successes and detection form a chief part of the comic part of the piece, together with Humphrey's oddities. The knight's daughter Georgina is a sprightly, giddy girl, and her lover Conway has some scenes that contain pleasantry.

Lady Horatia and her lover Asgill furnish the upper plot. This lady is a widow and a statuary. She is sensible of Asgill's merits but conceals her partiality, till she hears that, reduced to distress, he, in a fit of desperation, had entered himself on board a man of war. She then, before his uncle Sir Simon, in a burst of tenderness and sympathy, acknowledges her passion; after which Sir Simon informs her Asgill's poverty was merely ideal, and an imposition of his contrivance to try her affection.

Jenny, the chamber-maid, whose brother Tippy is, carries on a plot to have him married to Georgina, which however miscarries, and a union takes place between Lady Horatia and Asgill, and Georgina and Conway.

Acid is an ignorant connoisseur, who threatens to Peter Pindar the whole royal society.

Mrs. Fancourt, whose virtue is proof against distress, and who suspects the designs of her husband against Georgina, assumes the garb and manners of a Savoyard, and attracting the attention of that young lady, under pretence of telling her fortune, warns her against the arts of the confederates. Her services are discovered by the knight, who rewards her with his gratitude and protection.

== Revivals and adaptations ==
This comedy being withdrawn for some time, made it appearance again on Monday, 22 December, with considerable improvements, and some judicious alterations. Acid is entirely cut out, and Tippy made a connoisseur.

== Bibliography ==
- Nicoll, Allardyce. A History of English Drama 1660–1900: Volume III. Cambridge University Press, 2009.
- Hogan, C.B (ed.) The London Stage, 1660–1800: Volume V. Southern Illinois University Press, 1968.
- Unknown. Universal Magazine. Volume 95: pp. 455. London, England: 1794.
