= Eloisa (play) =

1786 play

- Written by: Frederick Reynolds
- Original language: English
- Genre: Tragedy

Premiere
- Date premiered: 20 December 1786
- Place premiered: Theatre Royal, Covent Garden, London

Eloisa is a 1786 tragedy by the British author Frederick Reynolds. It premiered at the Theatre Royal, Covent Garden in London on 20 December 1786. The original Covent Garden cast included Joseph George Holman as Villiers, William Farren as Hainhault, William Macready as Courcy, Alexander Pope as Preux and Ann Brunton Merry as Eloisa. The Irish premiere took place at the Smock Alley Theatre in Dublin on 14 July 1787.

== Bibliography ==
- Greene, John C. Theatre in Dublin, 1745-1820: A Calendar of Performances, Volume 6. Lexington Books, 2011.
- Nicoll, Allardyce. A History of English Drama 1660–1900: Volume IV. Cambridge University Press, 2009.
