= Werter (play) =

1785 play

- Original language: English
- Written by: Frederick Reynolds
- Genre: Tragedy

Premiere
- Date: 25 November 1785
- Place: Theatre Royal, Bath, Bath

Werter is a 1785 tragedy by the British writer Frederick Reynolds. His debut play, it is an adaptation of the 1774 novel The Sorrows of Young Werther by Johann Wolfgang von Goethe. It first appeared at the Theatre Royal, Bath on 25 November 1785. Its London premiere came at the Theatre Royal, Covent Garden on 14 March 1786. The original Covent Garden cast included Joseph George Holman as Werter, William Davies as Sebastian, James Fearon as Leuthrop, William Farren as Albert and Ann Brunton as Charlotte. The Dublin premiere was at the Smock Alley Theatre on 2 December 1786.

== Bibliography ==
- Greene, John C. Theatre in Dublin, 1745-1820: A Calendar of Performances, Volume 6. Lexington Books, 2011.
- Nicoll, Allardyce. A History of English Drama 1660–1900: Volume IV. Cambridge University Press, 2009.
