= The German Hotel =

1790 play by Thomas Holcroft

- Original language: English
- Written by: Thomas Holcroft
- Genre: Comedy

Premiere
- Date: 11 November 1790
- Place: Covent Garden Theatre, London

The German Hotel is a 1790 comedy play by the British writer Thomas Holcroft.

The original Covent Garden cast included John Quick as Count Werling, Joseph George Holman as Dorville, Francis Aickin as Count Kolberg, William Farren as Baron Thorck, Richard Wilson as Rummer, John Bernard as William, Charles Farley as Messenger, Isabella Mattocks as Adelaide and Jane Pope as Mrs Dorville.

George III and Queen Charlotte attended a performance of the play in December 1790 "and seemed highly gratified with the whole performance".

== Bibliography ==
- Nicoll, Allardyce. A History of English Drama 1660–1900: Volume III. Cambridge University Press, 2009.
- Hogan, C.B (ed.) The London Stage, 1660–1800: Volume V. Southern Illinois University Press, 1968.
