= Cheap Living =

1797 play

- Written by: Frederick Reynolds
- Original language: English
- Genre: Comedy
- Setting: A seaport in England, present day

Premiere
- Date premiered: 21 October 1797
- Place premiered: Theatre Royal, Drury Lane, London

Cheap Living is a 1797 comedy play by the English writer Frederick Reynolds. It premiered at the Theatre Royal, Drury Lane in London on 21 October 1797. The original cast included Richard Suett as Old Woodland, Charles Kemble as Young Woodland, Robert Palmer as Scatter, Charles Bannister as Spunge, Dorothea Jordan as Sir Edward Bloomly, Jane Pope as Mrs. Scatter, Maria Theresa Kemble as Elinor Bloomly. The Irish premiere occurred on the 2 January 1799 at the Crow Street Theatre in Dublin.

== Bibliography ==
- Greene, John C. Theatre in Dublin, 1745-1820: A Calendar of Performances, Volume 6. Lexington Books, 2011.
- Nicoll, Allardyce. A History of English Drama 1660–1900: Volume IV. Cambridge University Press, 2009.
