= Secrets Worth Knowing =

1798 play

- Written by: Thomas Morton
- Original language: English
- Genre: Comedy

Premiere
- Date premiered: 11 January 1798
- Place premiered: Covent Garden Theatre, London

Secrets Worth Knowing is a 1798 comedy play by the British writer Thomas Morton.

The original Covent Garden cast included William Thomas Lewis as Rostrum, John Quick as Nicholas, Joseph George Holman as Egerton, Alexander Pope as Greville, Joseph Shepherd Munden as Undermine, John Fawcett as April, Thomas Knight as Plethora, Charles Farley as Valet, James Thompson as Cook and Isabella Mattocks as Sally.

== Bibliography ==
- Nicoll, Allardyce. A History of English Drama 1660–1900: Volume III. Cambridge University Press, 2009.
- Hogan, C.B (ed.) The London Stage, 1660–1800: Volume V. Southern Illinois University Press, 1968.
