= England Preserved =

1795 play

- Written by: George Watson-Taylor
- Original language: English
- Genre: Historical
- Setting: England, fifteenth century

Premiere
- Date premiered: 21 February 1795
- Place premiered: Theatre Royal, Covent Garden, London

England Preserved is a 1795 historical play by the British politician and writer George Watson-Taylor. It premiered at the Theatre Royal, Covent Garden in London on 21 February 1795. The original cast included Alexander Pope as Earl of Pembroke, Thomas Hull as Bishop of Winchester, William Farren as Earl of Chester, Joseph George Holman as Earl of Surrey, James Middleton as William Mareschal, William Davies as Earl of Lincoln, John Richardson as Lord Robert Fitzwalter, William Macready as English knight, George Davies Harley as French Prince, William Claremont as Vicomte De Beaumant and Tryphosa Jane Wallis as Lady Surrey. It takes place during the era of the Earl of Pembroke who acts as Lord Protector on behalf of his infant nephew in the early fifteenth century.

== Bibliography ==
- Greene, John C. Theatre in Dublin, 1745–1820: A Calendar of Performances, Volume 6. Lexington Books, 2011.
- Nicoll, Allardyce. A History of English Drama 1660–1900: Volume III. Cambridge University Press, 2009.
- Hoagwood, Terence Allan & Watkins, Daniel P. British Romantic Drama: Historical and Critical Essays. Fairleigh Dickinson Univ Press, 1998.
- Hogan, C.B (ed.) The London Stage, 1660–1800: Volume V. Southern Illinois University Press, 1968.
