= Clara Pope =

British artist (c. 1767–1838)

Clara Maria Pope Clara Pope Wheatley
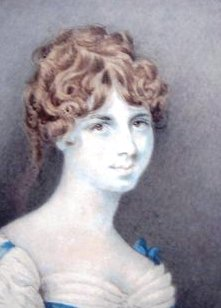
- Born: Clara Maria Leigh c.1767 London, United Kingdom
- Died: 24 December 1838; London, United Kingdom
- Known for: Painting
- Spouses: Francis Wheatley (m. 1787–1801) Alexander Pope (m. 1807)

Clara Maria Leigh or Clara Maria Pope (c.1767 – 24 December 1838) was a British painter and botanical artist.

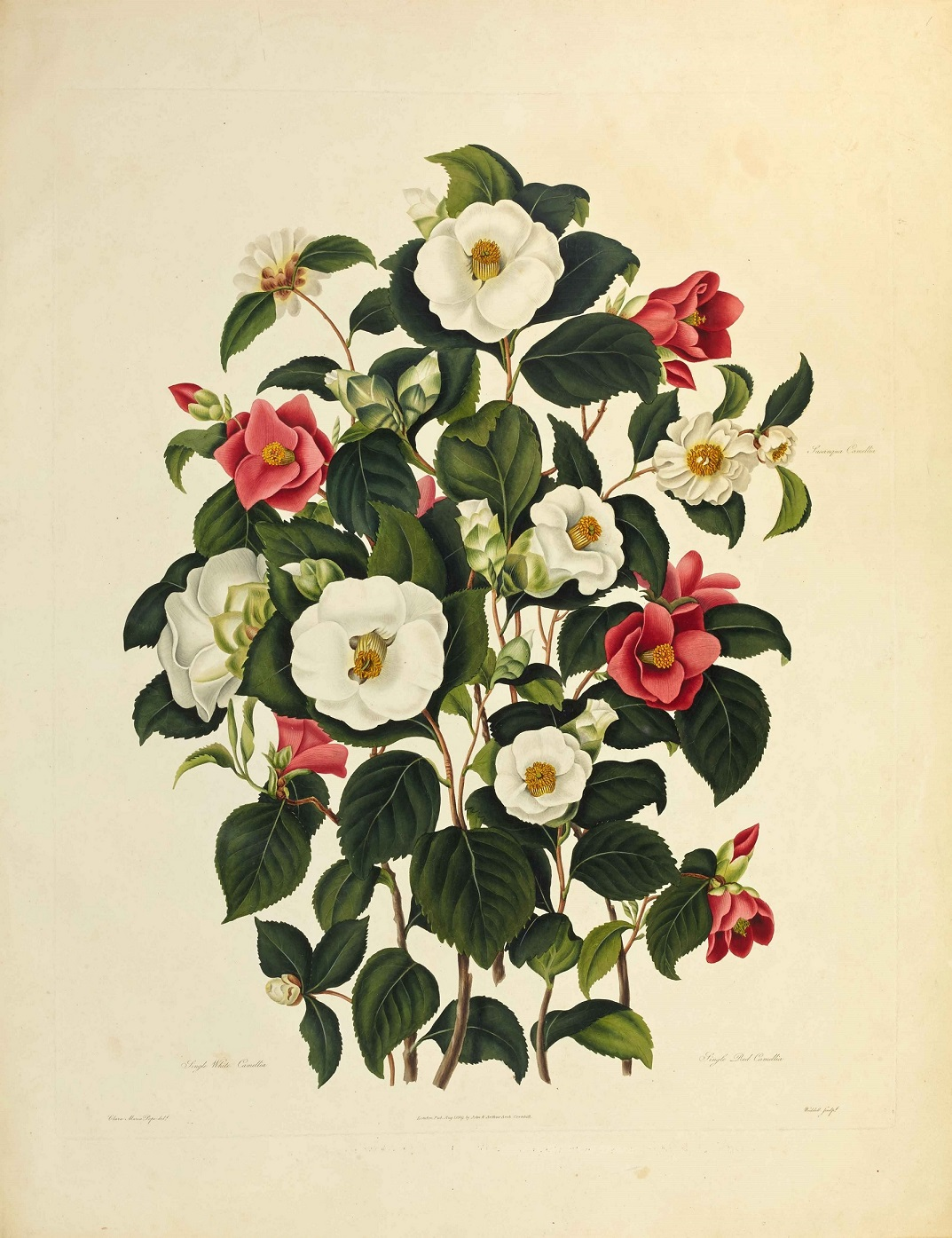
Illustration of camellias by Clara Maria Pope for Samuel Curtis's Monograph on the Genus Camellia, c. 1819.

== Life ==
Born in London, Leigh was christened in 1767 at St Andrew-by-the-Wardrobe. Her father was Jared Leigh, an amateur artist. She is pictured as an infant with her parents and siblings in George Romney's 1768 painting of the family group held by the National Gallery of Victoria at Melbourne, Victoria, Australia. She worked as an artist's model for a number of years. She married the painter Francis Wheatley in 1786. They had four daughters, Clara Maria (1788 - 1847) who married Thomas Clark Brettingham, Frances (1790 - 1848) who married Charles Middleton, Caroline Groves (1793 - 1879) who married James Adams and Emma (Feb 1795 - Mar 1795) and a son Francis John (1791 - 1872) who married Martha Ewing.

Leigh began by painting miniatures, and by 1796 she was exhibiting at the Royal Academy. Her husband died in 1801, and Leigh struggled to support her family. An accomplished botanical artist by this stage, her work was noticed for its beauty and accuracy by Samuel Curtis, the publisher of the Botanical Magazine. She created notable full-sized illustrations for Curtis's Botanical Magazine as well as for his other works, Monograph on the Genus Camellia (1819) and The Beauties of Flora . She was supported in her work by the architect Sir John Soane, who commissioned the watercolour The Flowers of Shakespeare (1835), which depicts a bust of the bard in Soane's collection surrounded by all the flowers mentioned in Shakespeare's works.

In 1807, Leigh married the actor and painter Alexander Pope, becoming his third wife. She taught painting, and her students included Princess Sophia of Gloucester and other members of the British aristocracy.

Her work is included in the collection of the Tate Museum.

Pope died in London in 1838.
