= The Siege of Meaux =

1794 play

- Original language: English
- Written by: Henry James Pye
- Genre: Tragedy
- Setting: Meaux, France, 14th century

Premiere
- Date: 19 May 1794
- Place: Theatre Royal, Covent Garden, London

The Siege of Meaux is a 1794 historical tragedy by the English writer Henry James Pye. It premiered at the Theatre Royal, Covent Garden on 19 May 1794. It is set around the fighting at Meaux in the wake of the Battle of Poitiers during the Hundred Years War. The original cast included William Farren as Duke of Orleans, Alexander Pope as Baron St Pol, Joseph George Holman as Earl of Douglas, James Middleton as Captal De Buche, George Davies Harley as Dubois and Elizabeth Pope as Matilda.

== Bibliography ==
- Greene, John C. Theatre in Dublin, 1745-1820: A Calendar of Performances, Volume 6. Lexington Books, 2011.
- Nicoll, Allardyce. A History of English Drama 1660–1900: Volume IV. Cambridge University Press, 2009.
