= How to Grow Rich =

1793 play

- Written by: Frederic Reynolds
- Original language: English
- Genre: Comedy
- Setting: A seaport in England, present day

Premiere
- Date premiered: 18 April 1793
- Place premiered: Theatre Royal, Covent Garden, London

How to Grow Rich is a 1793 comedy play by the British writer Frederic Reynolds. It premiered at the Theatre Royal, Covent Garden in London on 18 April 1793. The original London cast included William Thomas Lewis as Pave, John Quick as Smalltrade, Joseph Shepherd Munden as Sir Thomas Roundhead, John Fawcett as Latitat, William Blanchard as Hippy, Alexander Pope as Warford, William Farren as Sir Charles Dazzle, William Cubitt as Plainly, James Thompson as Formal, Samuel Simmons as Sir Thomas' servant, Jane Pope as Lady Henrietta, Harriet Pye Esten as Rosa and Charlotte Chapman as Miss Dazzle. The Irish premiere took place at the Crow Street Theatre in Dublin on 1 July 1793.

== Bibliography ==
- Greene, John C. Theatre in Dublin, 1745-1820: A Calendar of Performances, Volume 6. Lexington Books, 2011.
- Nicoll, Allardyce. A History of English Drama 1660–1900: Volume IV. Cambridge University Press, 2009.
