= William Macready the Elder =

Irish actor-manager (1755–1829)

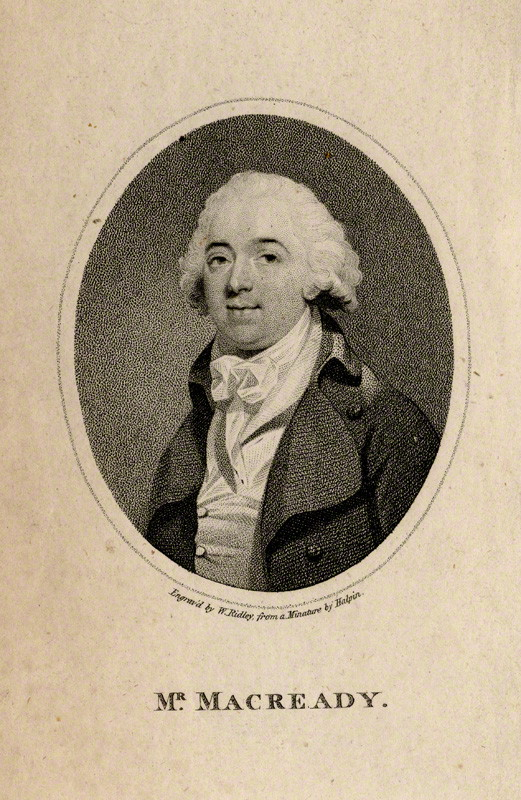
William Macready, 1794 engraving

William Macready the Elder (1755 – 11 April 1829) was an Irish actor-manager.

== Early life ==
Born 1755, to a Dublin upholsterer, Macready started his career playing in Irish country towns. He joined the Capel Street Theatre in Dublin in 1782, and the Crow Street Theatre later during the 1782–3 season. The next season, he was brought to the Mill Gate Theatre, by Michael Atkins. He was in 1785 a member of the company at Smock Alley Theatre, Dublin.

On the introduction of Charles Macklin, Macready went to Liverpool, and to Manchester under George Mattocks at the beginning of 1786.

== The London stage ==
Macready appeared at Covent Garden Theatre, 18 September 1786, as Flutter in the Belle's Stratagem, and remained there ten years, playing parts such as Gratiano, Paris, Young Marlow, Figaro, Fag, and Tattle in Love for Love, and producing two plays by himself. He returned to Dublin to take summer parts, to the early 1790s.

At Covent Garden Macready took only supporting roles, to 1797: he was one of the proverbial "second-rate walking gentlemen". Then he sought to become an actor-manager outside London, with mixed success. He began in management at the Theatre Royal, Birmingham, when it reopened, after rebuilding, in June 1795; in 1796 George Davies Harley was denying a rift there with Macready.

== Provincial actor-manager ==
Macready managed a variety season in 1797, unsuccessfully, the Royalty Theatre, Wellclose Square, then east of London; his company was drawn from other theatres. The programme was directed towards burlettas and pantomimes.

Macready is best known as manager of the theatres at Birmingham, Sheffield, and other provincial towns and cities; but his ambitions were not fulfilled. In 1806, he took over at Newcastle from Stephen George Kemble, holding the lease to 1818. Macready also attempted but failed in management in Manchester. He was jailed for debt in Lancaster Castle in 1809. At that time he owed money on the Newcastle lease, and was trying to manage a group of theatres in locations also including Birmingham, Derby, Nottingham and Sheffield.

In 1813, Macready built the first theatre in Carlisle in Blackfriars Street. At the time of his second marriage, in 1821, he was described as manager of a theatre in Whitehaven.

== Works ==
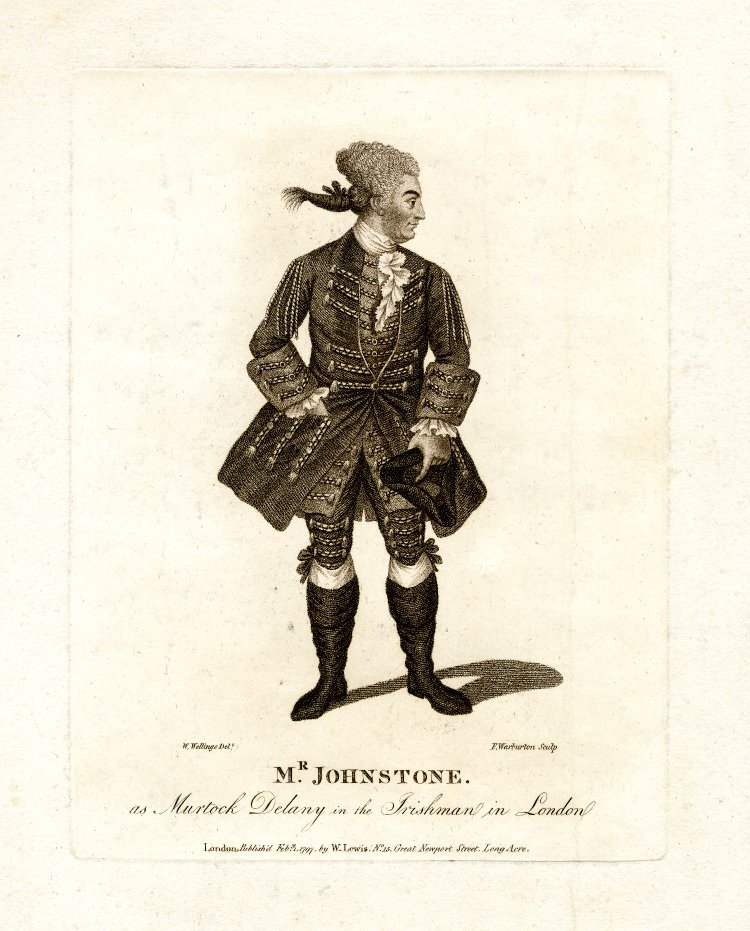
John Henry Johnstone as Murdock Delany in The Irishman in London, 1797 engraving

Macready was responsible for two adapted dramas. The Irishman in London, 1793 and 1799, performed 21 April 1792, was an adaptation of a farce called The Intriguing Footman, attributed to James Whiteley, manager at Nottingham. This work became popular on both sides of the Atlantic, being performed at the John Street Theatre in New York on 5 June 1793. Its use of blackface acting is considered an influence into the 19th century; it featured a contrast of the stage Irish and African servant. The censor John Larpent applied the blue pencil to some of the language of the play directed at a black female character, Cubba.

The Bank Note, 1795, performed 1 May 1795, was an adaptation of William Taverner's The Artful Husband.

The Village Lawyer, a farce, 1795, Haymarket, 28 August 1787, is ascribed to Macready, but probably in error, in a pirated edition. It is an adaptation of L'Avocat Pathelin by David-Augustin de Brueys; there is reason to believe that George Colman the Elder translated it. It has also been attributed to Charles Lyons, an Irish schoolmaster.

== Later and personal life ==
Macready took on the lease of the Theatre Royal, Bristol in 1819, from John Boles Watson II, son of John Boles Watson who had built up a southern and Welsh circuit of 40 provincial theatres. He initially brought in Daniel Terry and Elizabeth Yates to launch the new management, with the help of his son William.

Macready died at Bristol 11 April 1829, aged 74. He left interests in the Theatre Royal, Bristol, and theatres in Cardiff and Swansea.

Macready married, 18 June 1786 in Manchester, Christina Ann Birch, an actress, the daughter of a surgeon in Lincolnshire. Mrs. Macready, who played secondary parts, died in Birmingham 3 December 1803, aged 38. William Macready was their son. He was the fifth of eight children of the marriage. Another of Macready's sons, Major Edward Nevil Macready, commanded the Light Company of the 30th Regiment of Foot in the closing stages of the Battle of Waterloo.

== Selected roles ==
- Courcy in Eloisa by Frederick Reynolds (1786)
- Meanright in Such Things Are by Elizabeth Inchbald (1787)
- Lord Henley in All on a Summer's Day by Elizabeth Inchbald (1787)
- Granada in The Child of Nature by Elizabeth Inchbald (1788)
- Marquis De Lancey in Animal Magnetism by Elizabeth Inchbald (1788)
- Willoughby in The Dramatist by Frederick Reynolds (1789)
- Muley in A Day in Turkey by Hannah Cowley (1791)
- Midg in Wild Oats by John O'Keeffe (1791)
- Roldan in Columbus by Thomas Morton (1792)
- Hosier in The Road to Ruin by Thomas Holcroft (1792)
- Briers in The World in a Village by John O'Keeffe (1793)
- Donaldson in The Siege of Berwick by Edward Jerningham (1793)
- English Knight in England Preserved by George Watson-Taylor (1795)
- Sibald in The Days of Yore by Richard Cumberland (1796)
- Flam in The Doldrum by John O'Keeffe (1796)
- Orville in Fortune's Fool by Frederick Reynolds (1796)
