= Fortune's Fool (1796 play) =

1796 English play by Frederic Reynolds

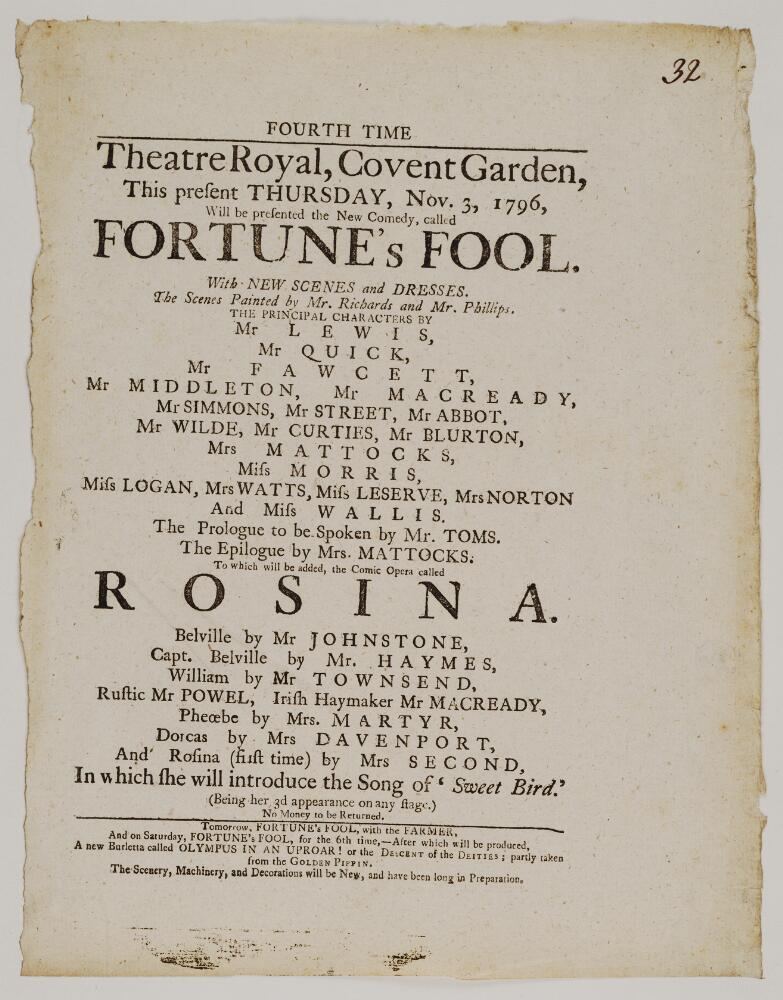
- Written by: Frederick Reynolds
- Original language: English
- Genre: Comedy
- Setting: London, present day

Premiere
- Date premiered: 29 October 1796
- Place premiered: Theatre Royal, Drury Lane, London

Fortune's Fool is a 1796 comedy play by the English writer Frederick Reynolds. It was first staged at the Covent Garden Theatre in London.

The original cast included William Thomas Lewis as Ap-Hazard, James Middleton as Sir Charles Danvers, John Quick as Sir Bamber Blackletter, John Fawcett as Tom Seymour, William Macready as Orville and Isabella Mattocks as Miss Union.

== Bibliography ==
- Hogan, C.B (ed.) The London Stage, 1660–1800: Volume V. Southern Illinois University Press, 1968.
- Nicoll, Allardyce. A History of English Drama 1660-1900. Volume III: Late Eighteenth Century Drama. Cambridge University Press, 1952.
