= Margaret Martyr =

British singer and actress

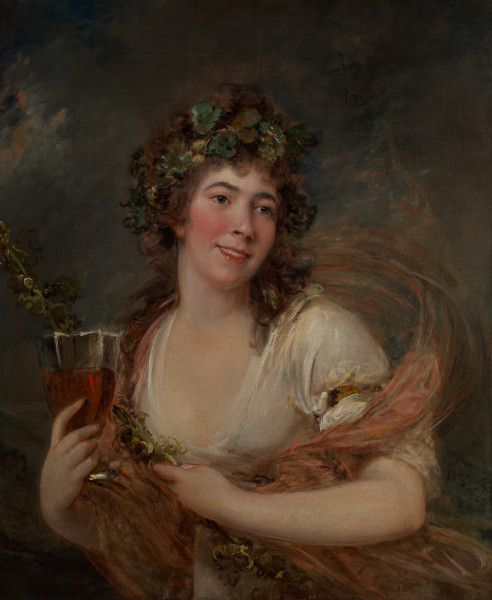
- by Gainsborough Dupont in 1794
- Born: Margaret Thornton; 1762 probably London, England, Kingdom of Great Britain
- Died: 7 June 1807 (aged 44–45); London, England, United Kingdom of Great Britain and Ireland
- Known for: acting
- Spouse: Captain Martyr
- Partner: William Parke
- Children: 3

Margaret Martyr or Margaret Thornton (1762 – 7 June 1807) was a British singer and actress.

== Life ==
Martyr's parents were living in London when she was born in 1762.

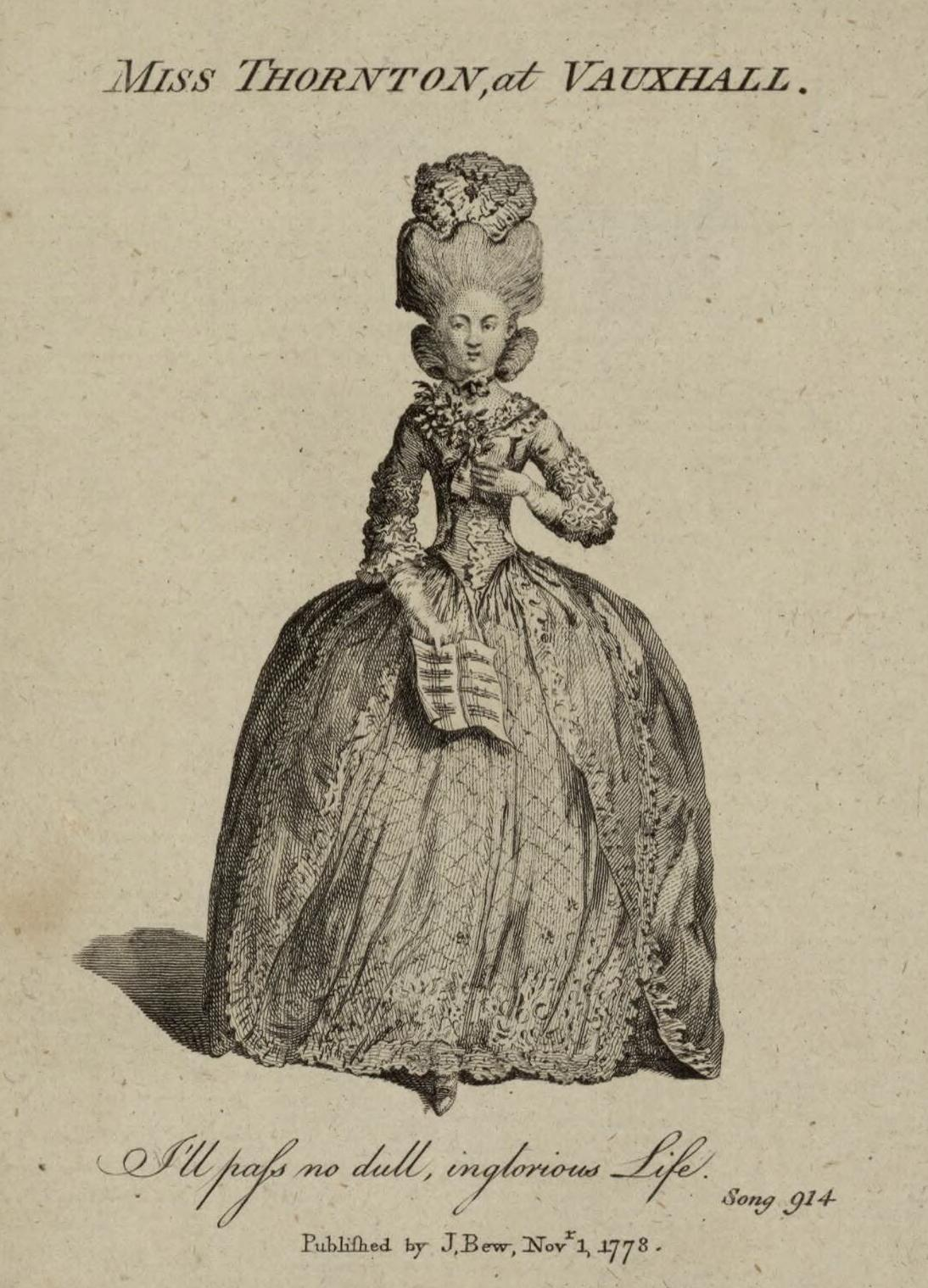
at Vauxhall as Miss Thorton

She came to notice in 1778 when she was singing songs by James Hook in Vauxhall Gardens. She was Hook's pupil and she sang there each summer until 1780. She moved to singing Ballad opera and appeared in Love in a Village at the Covent Garden Theatre in 1779.

She married Captain Martyr and they had a daughter. Her husband spent too much and died in 1783 - probably in Calais where he was escaping his debts. Martyr consoled herself with the prompter, James Wild, before establishing a lifelong partnership with the oboist William Thomas Parke. They had two sons but they never married.

Martyr's style is said to have come from her "notorious" mentor Ann Catley. Thomas Bellamy wrote of Martyr in 1795 "Catley's pupil - Catley's boast, Sportive, playful, arch and free, Lovely MARTYR, hail to thee!"

Before her sons were born she was earning ten pounds a week at the Covent Garden theatre where she appeared in "second woman" roles and in Breeches roles. In 1794 when she was playing Euphrosyne in Comus by George Colman the Elder. Until 1804 she would spend each winter at Covent Garden and in the summer she would tour outside London and appear at Vauxhall Garedens.

Martyr died on 7 June 1807 whilst still being paid by the Covent Garden theatre. She was buried in St Martin in the Fields.

== Legacy ==
Martyr's will recognised her partner Parke as her executor and the farm she owned at Yalding was divided between her two sons after her daughter was given half of it. There are a number of portraits of Martyr including a 1794 painting by Gainsborough Dupont,
