= George Davies Harley =

English actor and poet

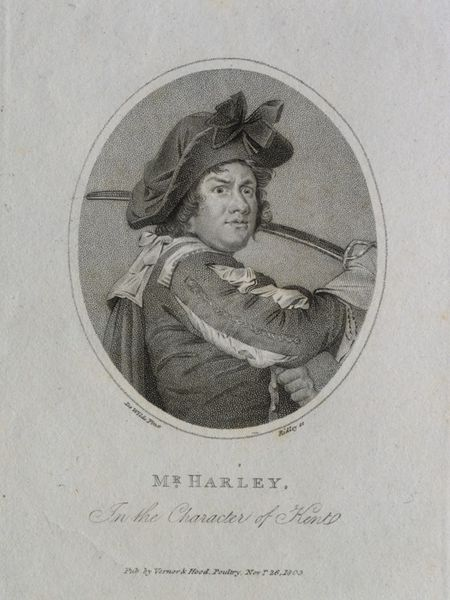
George Davies Harley, 1803 engraving as Kent in King Lear

George Davies Harley (1762 – 28 November 1811), originally George Davies, was an English actor and poet.

== Life ==
Harley was, according to one account, a tailor, and according to a second, a banker's clerk, and then a clerk in lottery offices. He received acting lessons from John Henderson, and made his first appearance on the stage as Richard III on 20 April 1785 at Norwich.

Becoming known as the "Norwich Roscius", Harley was engaged by Thomas Harris for Covent Garden Theatre, where he appeared as Richard 25 September 1789. In the course of this and two or three following seasons he played Shylock, Touchstone, King Lear, and Macbeth, and took original characters in plays of William Hayley and other writers. For career reasons he withdrew into the provincial theatres; but returned to Covent Garden, where he remained for four seasons. He then once more went into the provinces, and played old men in comedy with success at Bristol in 1796–9, and then at Birmingham, Sheffield, Wolverhampton, and elsewhere. In 1802 he supported Sarah Siddons in her farewell visit to Dublin.

Harley died at Leicester on 28 November 1811.

== Works ==
Harley's writings were:

- A Monody on the Death of Mr. John Henderson, late of Covent Garden Theatre, Norwich, 1787.
- Poems by George Davies Harley, of the Theatre Royal, Norwich. Printed for the author (by subscription), 1796.
- Ballad Stories, Sonnets, vol. i. Bath, 1799.
- Holyhead Sonnets, Bath, 1800.
- An Authentic Biographical Sketch of the Life, Education, and Personal Character of William Henry West Betty, the Celebrated Young Roscius, London, 1802.
- The Fight off Trafalgar, a descriptive poem, Sheffield and London, 1806.

His monody on Henderson imitates Thomas Gray's Elegy. Among his poems the longest are To Night, and A Legacy of Love, to his son aged four, whom he calls George the second, his predecessor being dead.

== Selected roles ==
- Chief Bramin in The Widow of Malabar by Mariana Starke (1790)
- Captain Seymour in The Irishman in London by William Macready the Elder (1792)
- Dubois in The Siege of Meaux by Henry James Pye (1794)
- French Prince in England Preserved by George Watson-Taylor (1795)
- Landlord in Delays and Blunders by Frederick Reynolds (1802)
- Waiter in The Delinquent by Frederick Reynolds (1805)

== Notes ==
Attribution

This article incorporates text from a publication now in the public domain: Stephen, Leslie; Lee, Sidney, eds. (1890). "Harley, George Davies". Dictionary of National Biography. Vol. 24. London: Smith, Elder & Co.
