= Mary Wells (actress) =

English actress and memoirist

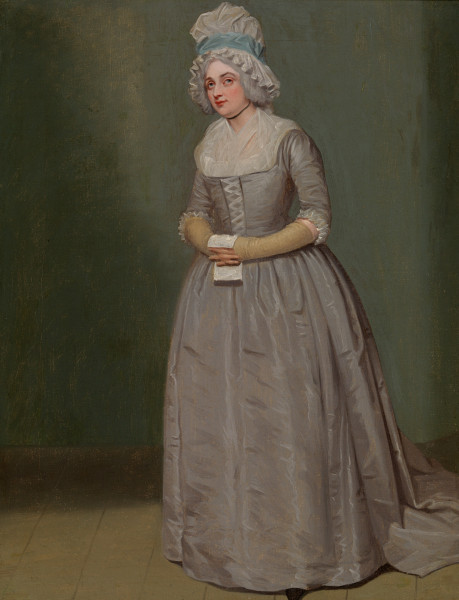
Wells as Anne Lovely in "A Bold Stroke for a Wife" by Samuel De Wilde

Mary Wells, afterwards Mrs. Sumbel (16 December 1762 – 23 January 1829), was an English actress and memoirist.

== Early life ==
She was the daughter of Thomas Davies, a carver and gilder who was born there on 16 December 1762 in Birmingham. Her father died whilst being held in a madhouse. Her widowed mother kept a tavern whose customers included the actor Richard Yates. Yates arranged for Mary to appear in a breeches role as the young Duke of York in Richard III at the Birmingham Theatre. She went to appear as Cupid in William Whitehead's Trip to Scotland, and as Arthur in King John. In Gloucester, she played Juliet and married the Mr Wells who played Romeo at Chad's Church in Shrewsbury. The marriage did not last long and she was abandoned.

== On the London stage ==
On 1 June 1781, as Madge in Isaac Bickerstaffe's Love in a Village and Mrs. Cadwallader in Samuel Foote's Author, she made her first appearance at the Haymarket. John Genest says that she was excellent in both characters. Jenny in Lionel and Clarissa (Bickerstaffe) followed, and on 3 September in John O'Keeffe's Agreeable Surprise she was the first Cowslip, a name that stuck to her (though she is occasionally spoken of as 'Becky' Wells). Genest wrote that nothing could be superior to her acting as Cowslip and that of John Edwin as Lingo.

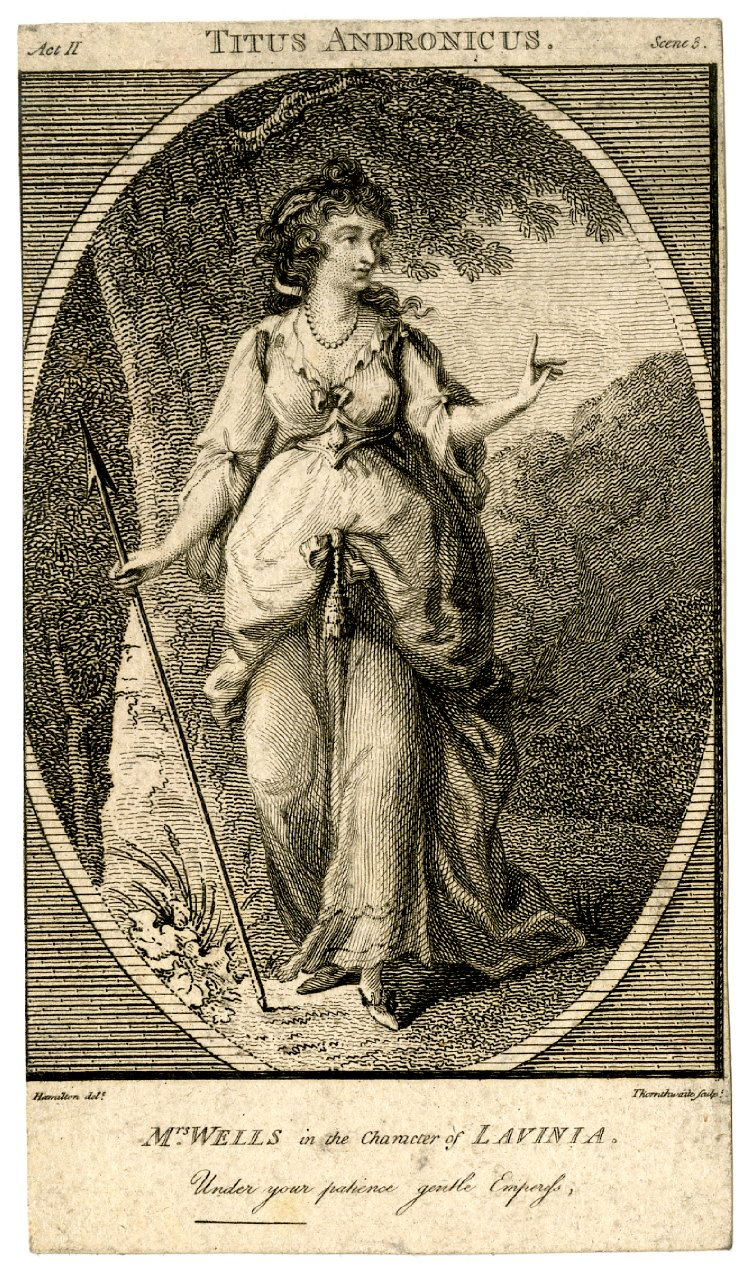
Mary Wells as Lavinia in Titus Andronicus, 1785 engraving by John Thornthwaite, after William Hamilton.

On 25 September, as Nancy in Love in a Camp, she made her first appearance at Drury Lane, where she also played on 29 October. Jenny in the Gentle Shepherd, adapted from Allan Ramsay by Richard Tickell. Harriet in the Jealous Wife, Widow O'Grady in the Irish Widow, Flora in She Would and She Would Not (Colley Cibber), and Jacintha in The Suspicious Husband followed. At the Haymarket in 1782 her name appears to Molly in the English Merchant and Bridget in The Chapter of Accidents (Sophia Lee). She also, as she says, replaced Mrs. Cargill, who had eloped, as Macheath in the Beggar's Opera, with the male characters played by women and vice versa. She made a distinguished success, and was received with great enthusiasm. She played at Drury Lane Kitty Pry in The Lying Valet, and Jane Shore on 30 April 1783, her first appearance in tragedy. At the Haymarket she was on 6 July 1784 the original Fanny in Elizabeth Inchbald's Mogul's Tale, on 6 September the first Maud in O'Keeffe's Peeping Tom, the eponymous Isabella, and Lady Randolph in Douglas.

Nancy Buttercup, an original part in O'Keeffe's Beggar on Horseback, was seen at the Haymarket on 16 June 1785. On 14 December she made her first appearance at Covent Garden as Jane Shore (in her own opinion, her best performance), playing also Laura in Edward Topham's farce The Fool, which her acting commended to the public. After repeating Lady Randolph and Isabella, she was on 5 January 1786 Imogen in Cymbeline; William Woodfall in the Morning Chronicle awarded her praise for the performance. Andromache in the Distressed Mother (Ambrose Philips) followed, and was succeeded by Shakespearean heroines (Rosalind, Portia), and Fidelia in the Plain Dealer; and she was on 24 April the first Eugenia in The Bird in a Cage, or Money works Wonders, altered from James Shirley. At the Haymarket in 1786 she played some unimportant original parts. When John Palmer made in 1787 his trial effort at the Royalty Theatre, Wellclose Square, she gave her imitations of Mrs. Siddons and other actresses, and was paid £50 a night.

She came back to Covent Garden, where she was on 17 September 1787 Mrs. Page in the Merry Wives of Windsor and played Lady Percy, Lady in Comus, Rosina, Anne Lovely, and Fatima in Cymon. Here she remained some time, acting in the summer at Cheltenham, Brighton, and Weymouth, where she was favoured by royalty.

== Personal troubles ==
She had three daughters with a writer named Edward Topham. At the beginning of 1787 Topham started a newspaper called the World and Fashionable Advertiser. Wells was at first lauded by the paper but as time went by she ended up managing it. She was a guarantor for her brother-in-law and this resulted in her being imprisoned for debt in the Fleet Prison. Whilst there she met a Sephardic Jew named Joseph Sumbel who was imprisoned for contempt and they married in prison. She became a Jew and took the name Leah. Sumbel was a secretary to the ambassador from Morocco. Sumbel tried unsuccessfully to have the marriage annulled. She later became a Christian again.

== Last years and death ==
She does not seem to have acted much later than 1790, though she gave her imitations at private houses; and once attempted to give them publicly during Lent, but was prevented by the bishop of London.

She spent her later years in lodgings with her aged mother. She also applied to the Covent Garden Theatrical Fund, and received an annuity of £55 until her death in London on 23 January 1829. She was buried in St Pancras, London.

== Works ==
She published in 1811 Memoirs of the Life of Mrs. Sumbel, late Wells, of the Theatres Royal Drury Lane, Covent Garden, and Haymarket, written by herself, (London, 3 vols.) The three volumes of this rambling autobiography are occupied principally with details of travels in search of her children, who refused to know her, or of friends. The remainder stock seems to have received a new title-page in 1828, when it appeared as Anecdotes and Correspondence of Celebrated Actors and Actresses, including Mr. Reynolds, Mr. Kelly, Mr. Kemble, Mr. Colman, Mrs. Siddons, &c. Also an Account of the Awful Death of Lord Lyttelton.

Her portrait, in the character of Cowslip in the Agreeable Surprise, was engraved by John Downman (Bromley, p. 447). A portrait of her by De Wilde, as Anne Lovely in A Bold Stroke for a Wife, is in the Mathews collection in the Garrick Club. An engraving by J. R. Smith from his own picture of her as Cowslip was published by Ackerman in 1802.
