= Ann Brunton Merry =

English actress (1769–1808)

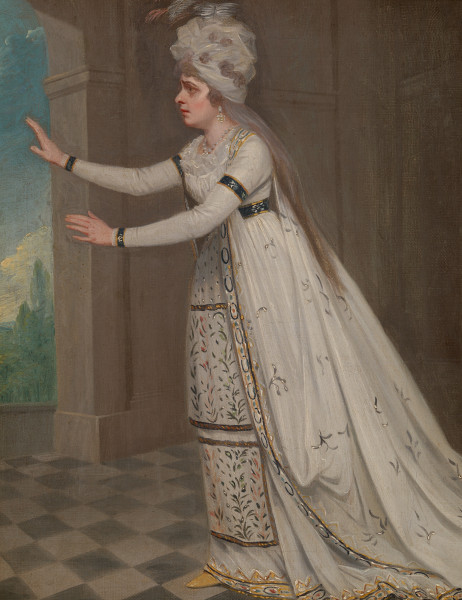
Anne Brunton Merry by Samuel De Wilde

Ann Brunton Merry (30 March 1769 – 28 June 1808) was an English actress popular in the Kingdom of Great Britain and later in the United States of America.

== Life ==
Ann (or Anne) Brunton was born 30 May 1769 in Covent Garden, England, one of 14 children of John Brunton (b. 1741), an actor and manager of the Theatre Royal, Norwich.

In February 1785, she first appeared at the Theatre Royal, Bath as Euphrasia in The Grecian Daughter, which was followed by other leading parts, and on 17 October of the same year she made her debut at Covent Garden theatre in London as Horatia in The Roman Father. Here she attained great distinction, and by many was rated second only to Sarah Siddons. An illustration of her in the role of Horatia appeared in the July 1787 edition of Walker's Hibernian magazine.

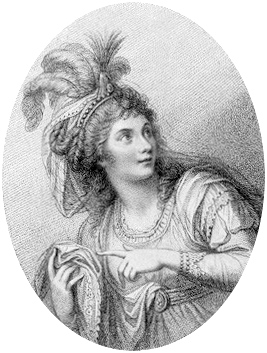
Ann Brunton Merry

In 1791 Brunton married Robert Merry, a poet and playwright known by his pen-name "Della Crusca". He had run through his patrimony, but at that time still figured in fashionable circles. She at once retired from the theatre, and went with her husband to Paris. They returned in 1792 and her husband's comic opera The Magician no Conjuror at Covent Garden was not a success.

She performed the character Juliet, for the Benefit of her sister at Yarmouth theatre, and as Donna Violante in The Wonder for Mr. Waddy's Benefit, when she took her leave of the stage. Mr Kemble was reported to wish to engage her for the Theatre-Royal, Newcastle in 1795.

When their means were entirely exhausted she wished to return to her former occupation. Family considerations on the part of Mr Merry forced her to leave the London stage, but an offer that was made through Thomas Wignell, of the New Theatre, Philadelphia, was readily accepted. The terms were reported as 'one thousand guineas, and two clear benefits for the Philadelphia season alone, for three years', the expenses in passage out were defrayed by the manager.

The couple arrived in New York City, 19 October 1796. Ann renewed her career at the Chestnut Street Theatre in Philadelphia on 5 December of the same year as Juliet in Romeo and Juliet. From 1797 until 1808 she performed with undiminished success in the large cities of the United States. Robert Merry died in 1798, and she returned to England and was engaged for the ensuing season at the Covent-Garden theatre in March 1800. On 1 January 1803, Ann married Thomas Wignell, who died seven weeks later from an infection on his arm. Their daughter, Elizabeth Ann (1803-1882), was born in September. From 1803 to 1805, she was the co-manager of her late husband's theatre company. In 1806, she became the wife of William Warren. Among her important roles were Calista in The Fair Penitent, Alica in Jane Shore, Isabella in The Fatal Dowry, and Monominia in The Orphan. She was the first actress of eminence that crossed the Atlantic, and easily held her own against all rivalry. A sister, Louisa Brunton, with whom she is sometimes confused, was a distinguished performer on the London stage in later years, and became Countess of Craven.

== Death ==
Ann Merry Wignell died in Alexandria, Virginia on 28 June 1808, having delivered a stillborn son four days earlier at Gadsby's Tavern. She was buried in Christ Church, Alexandria.
