= Frederick Reynolds (writer) =

English dramatist

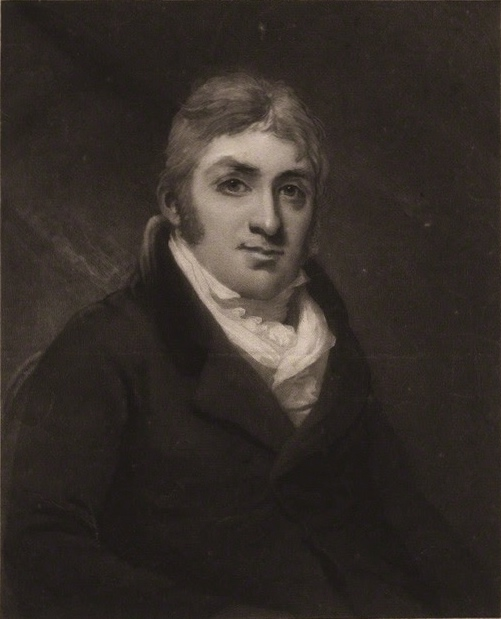
- Portrait of Frederick Reynolds by John Raphael Smith
- Born: 1 November 1764; London, England
- Died: 16 April 1841 (aged 76); London, England
- Spouse: Elizabeth Mansell

Frederick Reynolds (1 November 1764 – 16 April 1841) was an English dramatist. During his literary career he composed nearly one hundred tragedies and comedies, many of which were printed, and about twenty of them obtained temporary popularity. Reynolds' plays were slight, and are described as having been "aimed at the modes and follies of the moment". He is still occasionally remembered for his caricature of Samuel Ireland as Sir Bamber Blackletter in Fortune's Fool, and for his adaptations of some of Shakespeare's comedies. His first name is sometimes spelt as Frederic.

== Early life ==
Born in Lime Street, London, Frederick Reynolds was the grandson of an opulent merchant at Trowbridge in Wiltshire, and the son of a whig attorney who acted for Chatham, Wilkes, and many other prominent politicians. His mother was the daughter of a rich city merchant named West. For many years his father's business was very prosperous, but about 1787 he was involved in financial difficulties. When Reynolds was about six years old he was sent to a boarding school at Walthamstow, and on 22 January 1776 he was admitted at Westminster School. On 12 January 1782 he entered the Middle Temple, but he soon abandoned the law for playwriting.

== Cricket career ==
Reynolds was also a noted amateur cricketer. Mainly associated with Marylebone Cricket Club (MCC), he made two top-class appearances. The first was for the Earl of Winchilsea's XI in 1795, and the second was for England in 1796.

== Plays ==
His first piece, Werter, was founded on Goethe's novel, and was produced at the Bath Theatre on 25 November 1785, and at Covent Garden Theatre, London, for Miss Brunton's benefit, on 14 March 1786. In later years it was often reproduced on the stage, and it was printed both in London and Dublin, the play being cut down from five to three acts in about 1795. Eloisa, his second drama, was produced at Covent Garden in December 1786. Reynolds then abandoned tragedy for comedy, and his first comedy, The Dramatist, submitted to the public at the benefit of Mrs. Wells, on 15 May 1789 was received with great applause. It was performed before George III at Covent Garden on his first visit to the theater after his illness, on 18 October 1789. He wrote two pieces with Miles Peter Andrews. His play, The Caravan, or the Driver and his Dog, was performed at Drury Lane, with the introduction of a live dog that was trained to save a child from drowning by leaping from a rock and plunging into real water. It is still remembered through a jest of Sheridan, who burst into the greenroom, when the success of the play was established, with the shout of inquiry, "Where is he, my guardian angel?" The answer was made, "The author has just retired," but Sheridan replied, "Pooh! I mean the dog-actor, author and preserver of Drury Lane Theatre." His comedy Folly as it Flies was performed at Covent Garden in 1801. Lord Byron took a swipe at Reynolds in English Bards and Scotch Reviewers where he says: "Where Reynolds vents his 'dammes!' 'poohs!' and 'zounds!' / And common-place and common sense confounds."

== Family ==
He married Elizabeth Mansel on 16 March 1799, a young lady from Llangyfelach, Glamorgan, South Wales, who had taken to the stage and was then engaged at the Covent Garden Theatre. Elizabeth's brother was Robert Mansel, Manager of the Theatre Royal in York. Reynolds's eldest son, Frederic Mansel Reynolds, was a novelist and editor of The Keepsake. The couple moved to Newman Street in 1803, where his neighbors were Mrs. Siddons, Amelia Opie, and Thomas Holcroft.

== Later career ==
From 1814 to 1822 Reynolds was permanently engaged at Covent Garden Theatre as "thinker" for the management, and after the lapse of a year he discharged the same duties for Elliston at Drury Lane. In 1826 his autobiography, The Life and Times of Frederic Reynolds (although later editions sometimes spell his name 'Frederick'), was published. It was in this work he noted that, despite having written many successful dramatic works, he was not exceptionally wealthy. In the conclusion, he writes, "[H]aving been omitted from many wills on account of my supposed wealth, I hope this true, and faithful exposition of the real state of my finance, may catch the eye of some rich testator, and induce him to make me reparation, by bequeathing me a thumping legacy." In 1831 appeared a novel by him, A Playwright’s Adventures, published as the first volume of the Dramatic Annual. His last work was the pantomime produced at the Adelphi Theatre, London, at Christmas 1840. He died on 16 April 1841.

== Selected plays ==
- Werter (1785)
- Eloisa (1786)
- The Dramatist (1789)
- Notoriety (1791)
- How to Grow Rich (1793)
- The Rage (1794)
- Speculation (1795)
- Fortune's Fool (1796)
- Cheap Living (1797)
- The Will (1797)
- Laugh When You Can (1798)
- Management (1799)
- Life (1800)
- Folly as it Flies (1801)
- Delays and Blunders (1802)
- The Three Per Cents (1803)
- The Blind Bargain (1804)
- The Delinquent (1805)
- Begone Dull Care (1808)

== Notes ==
Attribution

- This article incorporates text from a publication now in the public domain: "Reynolds, Frederic (1764–1841)". Dictionary of National Biography. London: Smith, Elder & Co. 1885–1900.
