= William Powell (English actor) =

English actor (1735–1769)

William Powell (1735–1769) was an English actor.

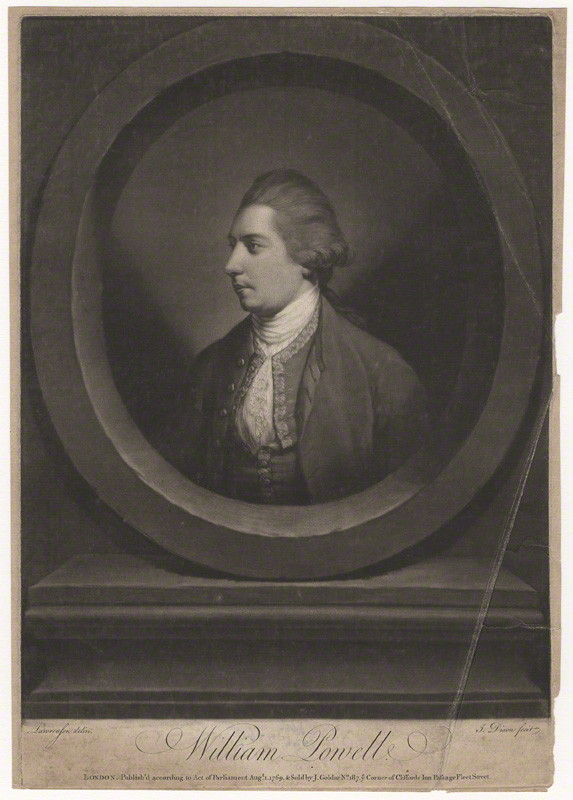
William Powell, 1769 engraving by John Dixon, after Thomas Lawranson

== Early life ==
Powell was born in Hereford, and was educated at Hereford grammar school and at Christ's Hospital in London. Sir Robert Ladbrooke, a distiller and then president of Christ's Hospital, took him on as apprentice in his counting-house. Powell, however, was interested in amateur theatricals: Ladbrooke suppressed a club in Doctors' Commons of which Powell had become a member. For a while Powell remained in Ladbrooke's office. Charles Holland however, introduced him to David Garrick, who wanted to travel and sought a substitute actor.

== At Drury Lane ==
Carefully coached by Garrick, Powell made his first appearance on stage at Drury Lane Theatre on 8 October 1763 as Philaster (in an adaptation of Beaumont and Fletcher's play, by George Colman the Elder). Supported also by James Lacy, Powell made a success. The ticket receipts were up to the best Garrick days.

Garrick reappeared in the season of 1765–6, and took over from Powell a few characters; Powell added to his repertory. In 1767, Powell joined Thomas Harris, John Rutherford, and Colman in purchasing John Rich's patents for Covent Garden Theatre. Powell was at this time bound for three years to Drury Lane under a penalty of £1,000, while his borrowed share of the purchase-money was £15,000.

== Bristol ==
Powell became a favourite in Bristol, where, at the Jacob's Well Theatre, on 13 August 1764, he took his first benefit as King Lear. On the erection of the King Street Theatre, the foundation-stone of which was laid on 30 November 1764, Powell became associated with two local men, Arthur and Clarke. The lease of the theatre was for seven years. On 30 May 1766, it opened with The Conscious Lovers, given gratis since the license had not yet been obtained, with Powell as Young Bevil. The Citizen (Arthur Murphy) with James William Dodd was also given. A prologue, written by Garrick, was spoken by Powell.

== At Covent Garden ==
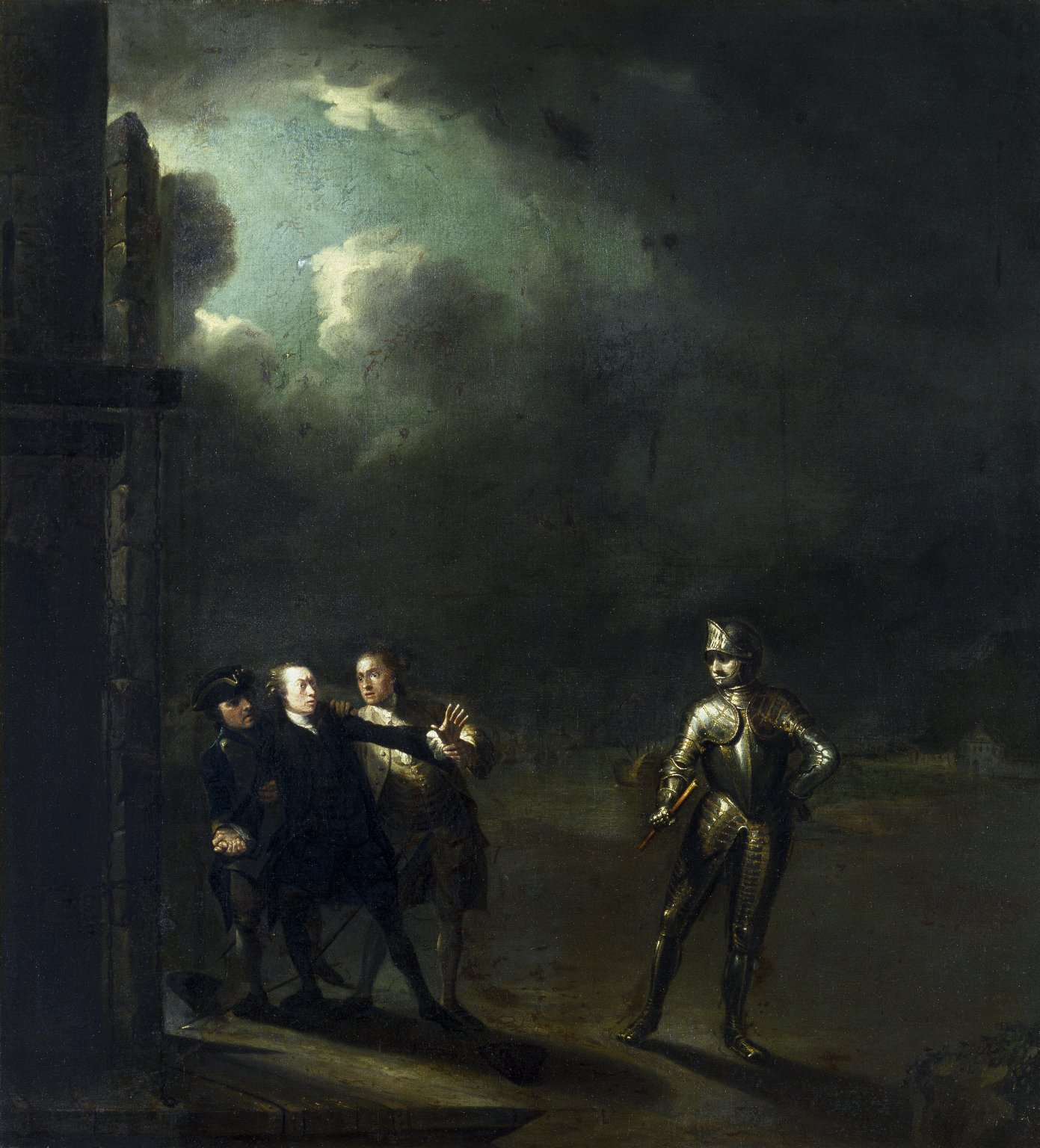
William Powell as Hamlet encountering the Ghost, c. 1768–1769, by Benjamin Wilson.

On the opening night, 14 September 1767, Powell spoke a rhymed prologue by William Whitehead, and on the 16th played Jaffier in Venice Preserved. Powell lived at this time in a house adjoining the theatre, and provided with a direct access. In the fierce quarrel which broke out during the season among the managers, leading to legal proceedings and a fierce polemic, Powell sided with George Colman, whom he had brought into the association, against Harris and Rutherford. On the closing night of the season, 26 May 1769, he played Cyrus in John Hoole's play of the name, which was his last appearance in London.

== Death ==
On 31 May 1769, Powell made, as Jaffier, his last appearance on the stage, in Bristol at the King Street Theatre. The following day he caught cold, playing cricket. His illness became severe, and King Street, in which, near the theatre, he lived, was barred by chains against carriages, by order of the magistrates. On Friday, at the request of his family and physician, the performances were suspended to avoid disturbing him, and on Monday, 3 July, at seven in the morning, he died. ‘Richard III’ was given that evening, and Holland, then manager, had to apologise for the inability of the actors to play their parts. The audience voluntarily dispensed with the closing farce.

Powell was buried on the following Thursday in Bristol Cathedral, Colman, Holland, and Clarke, with all the performers of the theatre, attending the funeral, which was conducted by the dean. An anthem was sung by the choir. On 14 July The Roman Father was performed in Bristol for the benefit of Powell's family, most of the audience appearing in black. An address by Colman was spoken by Holland, who did not long survive. A monument in the north aisle of the cathedral, erected by his widow, has an epitaph, also by Colman.

== Family ==
Once out of his indentures, Powell married, in 1759, a Miss Branston. Powell's wife made a début as Ophelia in Bristol in July 1766, but did not reach London. Widowed, she married again, in September 1771, John Abraham Fisher. Miss E. Powell appeared in Ireland, where she married H. P. Warren, an actor, and died as Mrs. Martindale in King Street, Covent Garden, in 1821. Another daughter married Mr. White, clerk of the House of Commons, and left daughters who were shareholders in Covent Garden Theatre.

== Notes ==
Attribution

This article incorporates text from a publication now in the public domain: Lee, Sidney, ed. (1896). "Powell, William (1735-1769)". Dictionary of National Biography. Vol. 46. London: Smith, Elder & Co.
