= Richard Yates (actor) =

English actor

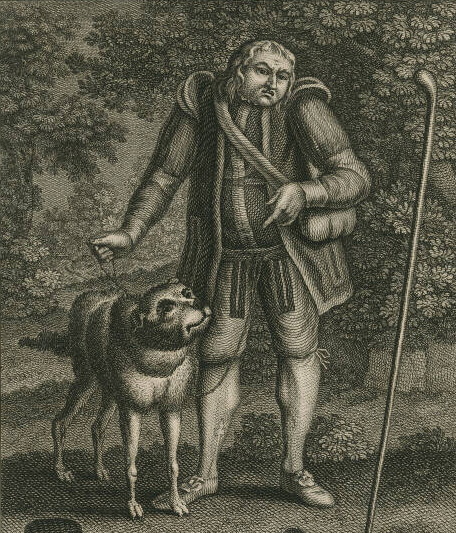
Richard Yates as Launce in Two Gentlemen of Verona, engraving by Henry Roberts after Thomas Bonnor

Richard Yates (c. 1706–1796) was an English comic actor, who worked at the Haymarket Theatre and Drury Lane among others, appearing in David Garrick's King Lear. He also worked in theatre management, and set up the New Theatre in Birmingham in 1773. Both his first wife, Elizabeth Mary (maiden name unknown, died in 1753) and Mary Anne Graham (1728–1787; married in 1756) were actresses.

== Life ==
Born about 1706, he played in Henry Fielding's Pasquin at the Haymarket when it was first performed. In 1737–9, at Covent Garden, he was seen in a number of parts. On 4 September 1739 he appeared at Drury Lane as Jeremy in Love for Love, and played other comic roles. At Goodman's Fields he appeared on 18 October 1740 as Antonio in Venice Preserved, playing further parts during the season. For his benefit and that of Mrs. Elizabeth Yates, his first wife (about whom little is known) who played at this time small parts such as Emilia in The Winter's Tale, and was the Duchess of York on David Garrick's first appearance on the stage, he attempted Lovegold in The Miser, in the style of Benjamin Griffin.

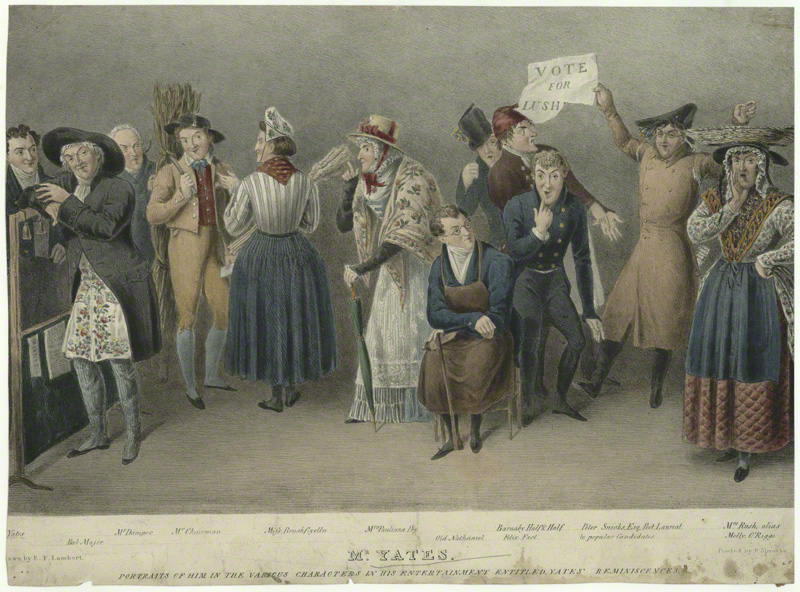
Richard Yates in a dozen roles, 1826 lithograph

Richard Yates is believed to have been the first Autolycus and Clown in All's well that ends well since 1660. He was on 9 November 1741 the original Mrs. Jewkes in James Dance's stage adaptation of the novel Pamela; or, Virtue Rewarded, and on 30 November the original Dick in Garrick's Lying Valet, subsequently taking Sharp in the same piece. On 18 September 1742 he reappeared at Drury Lane, where he remained until 1767. He was the original Motley in The Astrologer by James Ralph on 3 April 1744; Sir Robert Belmont in Edward Moore's The Foundling, 13 February 1748; Melchior in Moore's Gil Blas, 2 February 1751; and Puff in Samuel Foote's Taste, 11 January 1752.

In 1753–4 Mrs. Graham, subsequently Mary Ann Yates, joined the company, and Yates became closely associated with her. They seem to have been married in the autumn of 1756. In his later years he was reputedly engaged mainly on her account. He was, 30 April 1754, the original Grumbler. Yates had previously, 18 March, been the first Grumio in Garrick's Catharine and Petruchio. He was the first Wingate in Arthur Murphy's The Apprentice, 2 January 1756. He had at some time, probably around 1760, set up with Edward Shuter and others a booth at Bartholomew Fair, playing Pantaloon to Shuter's Harlequin. Yates was a pantomimist frequently himself seen as Harlequin.

Under the management of Thomas Harris, John Rutherford, George Colman the Elder, and William Powell, King made his first appearance at Covent Garden on 31 October 1767 as Major Oakly, in Colman's The Jealous Wife, and was the original Prig and Frightened Boor in Royal Merchant, an opera based by Thomas Hull on the Beggar's Bush on 14 December. At this house he played Cloten, Florimond in Edgar and Emmeline by John Hawkesworth, Sir Gilbert Wrangle in The Refusal, Brass, and Lucio. He was the original Sir Benjamin Dove in Richard Cumberland's Brothers, 2 December 1769; and Stanley in An Hour before Marriage, 25 January 1772. On 11 January 1773 he appeared at Edinburgh in Othello, and played also Captain Brazen, Touchstone, and Shylock. On 5 May 1775 he reappeared at Drury Lane as Scrub, but does not seem to have acted again that season. From 1780 to 1782 he was resting. On 6 December 1782 he made, as Sir Wilful Witwoud in The Way of the World, a first appearance at Covent Garden in ten years, and was on 28 January 1783 the first Sir Edmund Travers in Cumberland's Mysterious Husband.

== Last years ==
Yates from then no longer worked in London; he was engaged with his wife in Edinburgh 1784–5, and probably acted with her in York during her return journey on 21 April 1785. He retired with a handsome competence. His wife died 2 years later of dropsy ( heart attack) . In 1789 he was introduced to Miss Elizabeth Jones, an aspiring actress wishing to be employed in Yates's Birmingham theatre. Before long she had moved into the house in Stafford Row, Pimlico. She lived with him for 8 years until his death. This sets the scene for one of the greatest scandals of the age.

Richard and Mary Ann Yates had raised their great-niece and nephew, since they were small children. (Thomas Yates and his sister ( name unknown) The sister eloped with the Yates's coachman, a Mr Bowen and was disinherited, But Thomas was always considered the heir and expected to inherit the substantial fortune of Richard, including the Pimlico House and a house in Mortlake, carriages, silver and jewellery. Richard died in his bed, aged 86 April 1796 . Thomas was called to the house by Miss Jones who produced a document showing that everything (except a small annuity) was left to her. Thomas and Miss Jones lived in the house together for 4 months while Thomas tried to negotiate some sort of compromise settlement, but in late August, things took a sinister turn. Miss Jones brought two young men into the house, Mr Sellers and Mr Footner, and she locked all the doors while Thomas was in the garden. When he found himself locked out, he tried to climb through the kitchen window, assisted by his maid. Mr Sellars appeared in the kitchen and shot him dead. Sellers, Jones and Footner were tried at the Old Bailey for murder (Old Bailey Proceedings 14 Sept 1796) oldbaileyonline.org/browse.jsp?name+17960914

Mr Sellers was found guilty of manslaughter and gaoled for 6 months and fined 1 shilling. The others were acquitted. Many years later, Miss Jones (then Mrs Yarwood) confessed on her death bed that she had smothered Richard Yates with a pillow and forged the will and conspired with her accomplices to murder Thomas Yates. She did not have a happy life after the crime as she was blackmailed by the accomplices and gave them most of the fortune. In her old age she tried to trace Thomas Yates descendants and left them a chest full of jewels and silver, worth 30,000 pounds. Mrs Bowen ( thomas's sister who ran off with the coachman) was able to identify the jewels. After this incident the laws were changed to require that all wills be signed and witnessed in order to be valid. What became of the silver and jewels? A family member still has one of Richard's emerald shoe buckles as a ring. Three barrels of solid silver found its way to Dunedin in New Zealand, with Thomases great-grandchildren, there is sat and blackened in a cellar of a Miss Cargill, my mother's great-aunt, who was alcoholic. A maid asked her what should be done with the silver and the great aunt said 'Give it all to the dustman, which is what happened, and it was tipped into the landfill over which the cricket ground was built.

The widow of Thomas, Sarah Yates, was left destitute, but she took to the stage as Sarah Yates and later as Sarah Ansell after her marriage to Major Francis Ansell. 47th Highlanders. She played at Drury Lane: Margaret of Anjou in 1797 and 1800 as Angela in Castle Spectre and the Queen in Hamlet in 1802. She also toured in Dublin and Sheffield. She quit the theatre and had 2 sons with Francis and followed him to Portugal to the Peninsula wars, with her 4 children. Her daughter Mary Ann Yates, by Thomas Yates married Capt William Cargill in Oporto in 1812 and had 18 children with him and followed him to Dunedin New Zealand where they founded a colony.

Richard Yates was buried with his second wife Mary Ann in the chancel of the church of St Mary Magdalene, Richmond, near her family, . He was considered unequalled in Shakespearean clowns.
