= John Whitfield (actor) =

British stage actor (1752–1814)

John Whitfield (1752–1814) was a British stage actor.

He was part of the Covent Garden and Drury Lane companies, playing over two hundred roles. He often appeared alongside his wife Mary Whitfield.

== Selected roles ==
- Agenor in Cleonice, Princess of Bithynia by John Hoole (1775)
- Edric in Percy by Hannah More (1777)
- Sir Henry Lovewit in Know Your Own Mind by Arthur Murphy (1777)
- Earl of Surrey in Alfred by John Home (1778)
- Villers in The Belle's Stratagem by Hannah Cowley (1780)
- Don Garcia in A Bold Stroke for a Husband by Hannah Cowley (1783)
- Camillo in Julia by Robert Jephson (1787)
- Nicrates in The Fate of Sparta by Hannah Cowley (1788)
- De Courcy in The Haunted Tower by James Cobb (1789)
- Lupercio in Marcella by William Hayley (1789)
- Woodville in The Wheel of Fortune by Richard Cumberland (1795)
- Redwald in Edwy and Elgiva by Fanny Burney (1795)
- Wortimerus in Vortigern and Rowena by William Henry Ireland (1796)
- Earling in False Impressions by Richard Cumberland (1797)
- Delville in Laugh When You Can by Frederick Reynolds (1798)
- Sir Henry Netterville in The Eccentric Lover by Richard Cumberland (1798)
- Malcour in Folly as it Flies by Frederick Reynolds (1801)
- Melchior in Alfonso, King of Castile by Matthew Lewis (1801)

== Bibliography ==
- Cox, Jeffrey N. & Gamer, Michael. The Broadview Anthology of Romantic Drama. Broadview Press, 2003.
- Highfill, Philip H, Burnim, Kalman A. & Langhans, Edward A. A Biographical Dictionary of Actors, Actresses, Musicians, Dancers, Managers, and Other Stage Personnel in London, 1660-1800. SIU Press, 1973.
- Straub, Kristina, G. Anderson, Misty and O'Quinn, Daniel. The Routledge Anthology of Restoration and Eighteenth-Century Drama. Taylor & Francis, 2017.
