= Cleonice, Princess of Bithynia =

Play by John Hoole

- Written by: John Hoole
- Original language: English
- Genre: Tragedy

Premiere
- Date premiered: 2 March 1775
- Place premiered: Covent Garden Theatre, London

Cleonice, Princess of Bithynia is a 1775 tragedy by the British writer John Hoole. It is set in Bithynia during the Ancient era. It premiered at the Theatre Royal, Covent Garden in London. The original Covent Garden cast included Spranger Barry as Artabuses, Robert Bensley as Lycomedes, William Thomas Lewis as Pharnaces, John Lee as Orontes, Thomas Hull as Teramenes, James Thompson as Officer, John Whitfield as Agenor and Elizabeth Hartley as Cleonice.

== Bibliography ==
- Nicoll, Allardyce. A History of English Drama 1660–1900: Volume III. Cambridge University Press, 2009.
- Hogan, C.B (ed.) The London Stage, 1660–1800: Volume V. Southern Illinois University Press, 1968.
