= Mary Ann Yates =

English tragic actress (1728–1787)

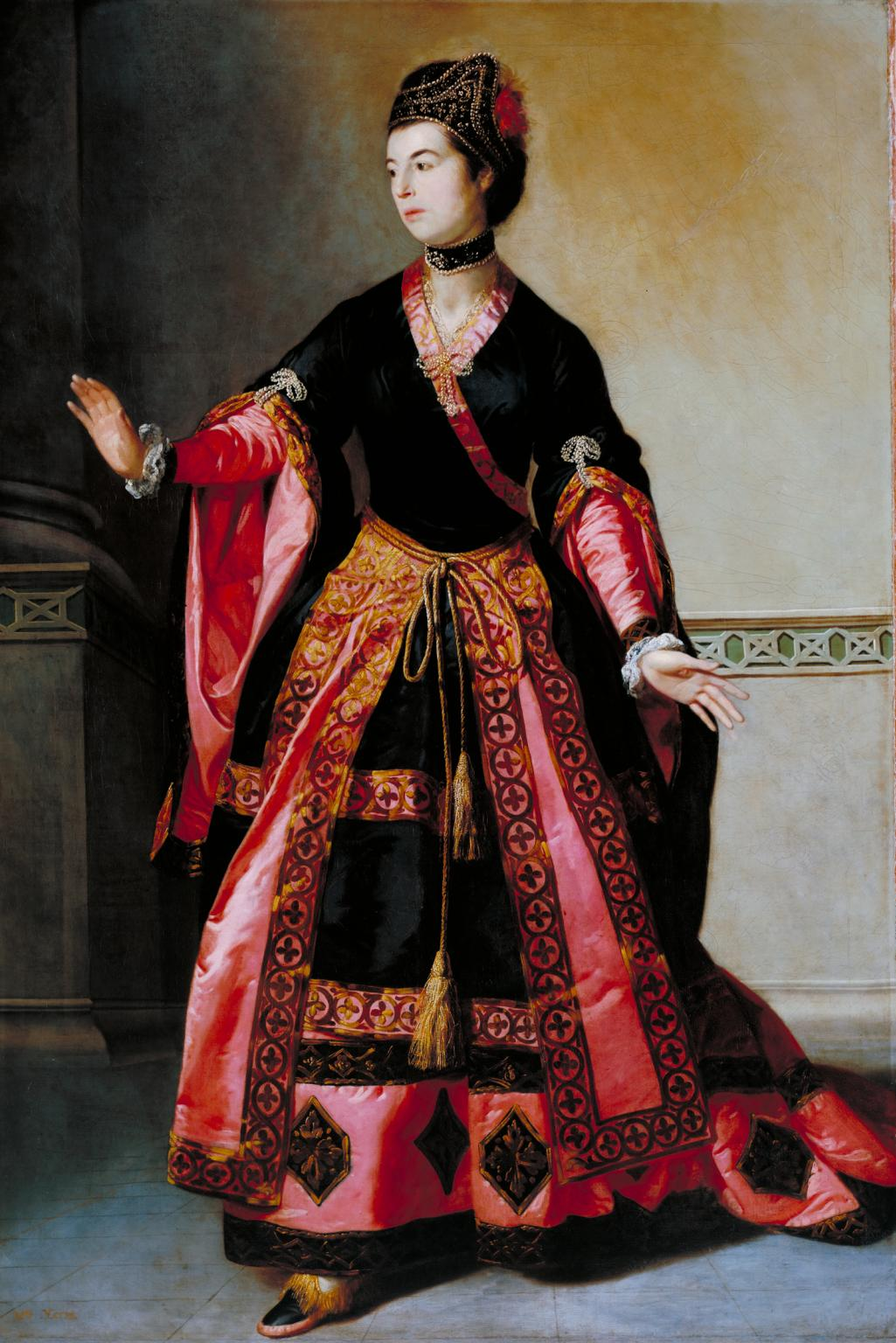
Mary Ann Yates as Mandane by Tilly Kettle, 1765

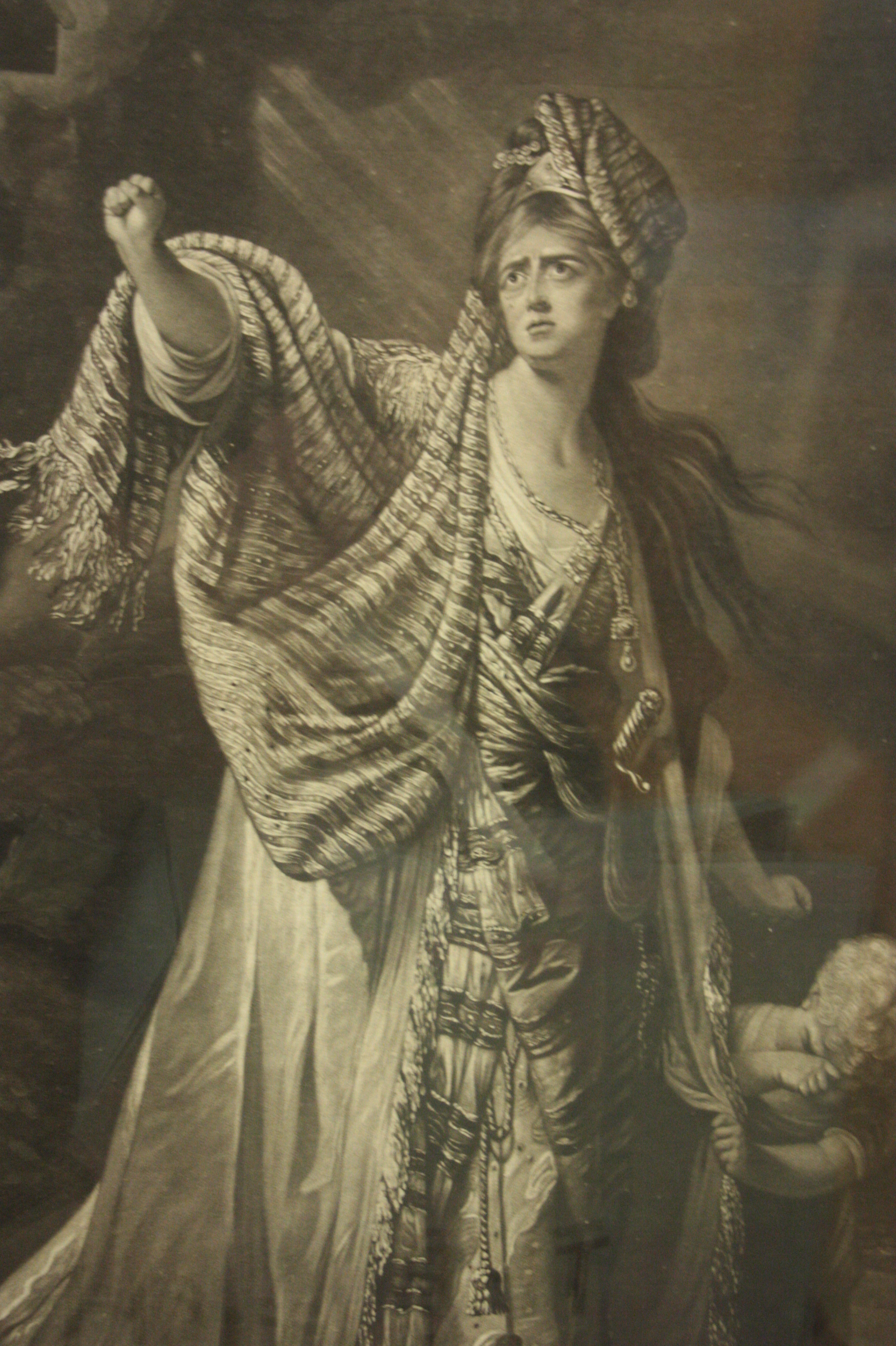
Mary Ann Yates as Medea (by Richard Glover), mezzotint by William Dickinson, 1771

Mary Ann Yates (1728–1787) was an English tragic actress. The daughter of William Graham, a ship's steward and his wife, Mary, she married Richard Yates (c. 1706–1796), a well-known comedian of the time.

In 1754, aged 25, she appeared at Drury Lane as Marcia in Samuel Crisp's Virginia. David Garrick played the part of Virginius. Yates was gradually entrusted with all the leading parts and succeeded the then famous actress Mrs Cibber as the leading tragedienne of the English stage. She was in turn succeeded and eclipsed by the famous Sarah Siddons.

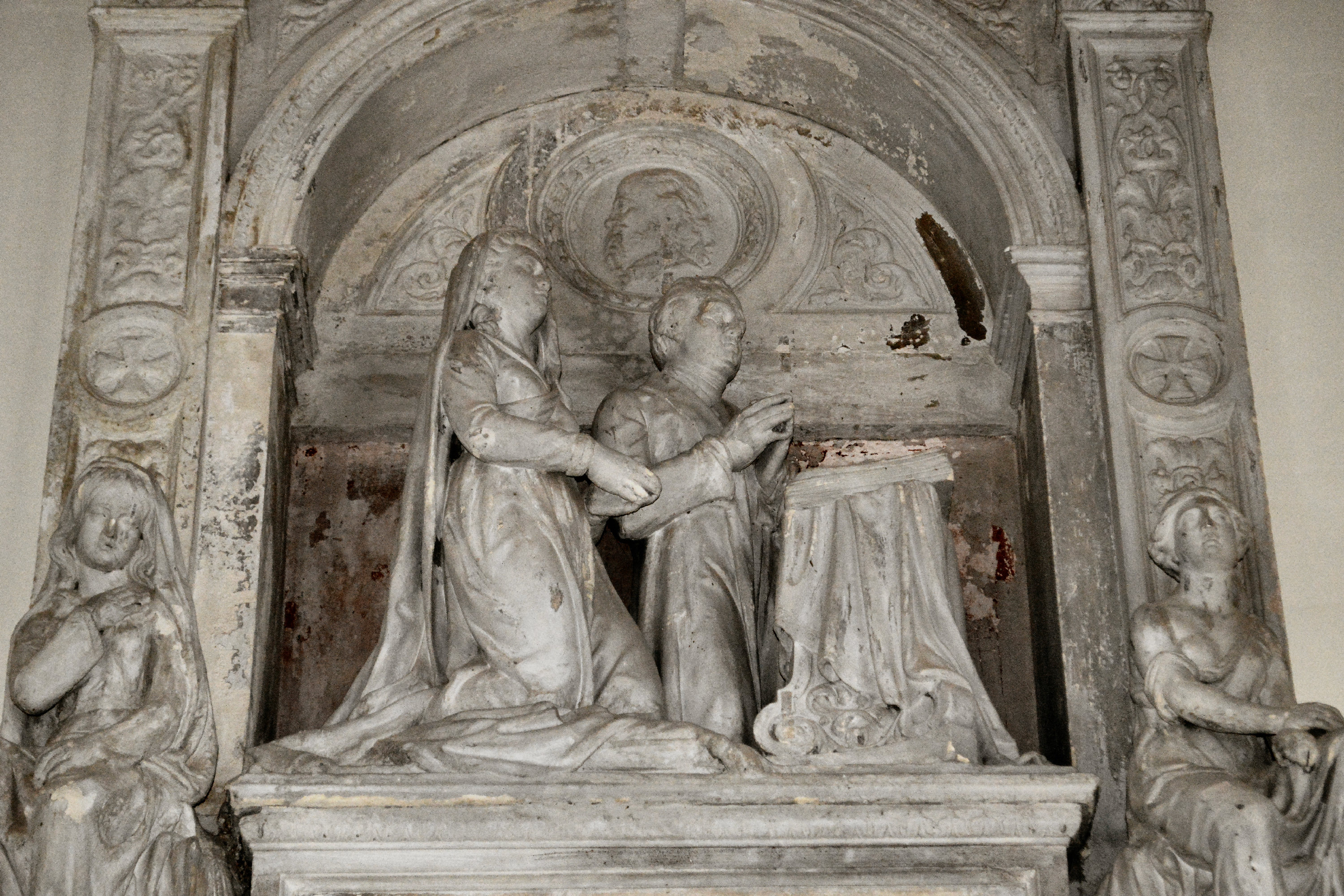
Memorial in St Mary Magdalene's Church, Richmond

There were benefit performances for Yates in 1797 at The Haymarket which included an appearance by Harriett Litchfield.

== Selected roles ==
- Marcia in Virginia by Samuel Crisp (1754)
- Sandane in Agis by John Home (1758)
- Mandane in The Orphan of China by Arthur Murphy (1759)
- Mrs Lovemore in The Way to Keep Him by Arthur Murphy (1760)
- Belinda in All in the Wrong by Arthur Murphy (1761)
- Araminta in The School for Lovers by William Whitehead (1762)
- Mrs Knightly in The Discovery by Frances Sheridan (1763)
- Mandane in Cyrus by John Hoole (1768)
- Sophia in The Brothers by Richard Cumberland (1769)
- Ismena in Timanthes John Hoole (1770)
- Clementina in Clementina by Hugh Kelly (1771)
- Duchess in Braganza by Robert Jephson (1775)
- Edwina in The Battle of Hastings by Richard Cumberland (1778)
- Zoraida in Zoraida by William Hodson (1779)
