= The Brothers (Cumberland play) =

1769 comedy play by Richard Cumberland

The Brother
- Original language: English
- Written by: Richard Cumberland
- Genre: Comedy
- Setting: Cornwall, present day

Premiere
- Date: 2 December 1769
- Place: Theatre Royal, Covent Garden, London

The Brothers is a 1769 comedy play by Richard Cumberland. The play was Cumberland's breakthrough work. Its complicated plot involved a villain with a virtuous young brother and was set partly in Cornwall. He dedicated the play to the prime minister of the United Kingdom the Duke of Grafton. Two years later Cumberland went on to write his most successful work The West Indian.

It premiered at the Theatre Royal, Covent Garden in London on 2 December 1769. The original cast included Richard Yates as Sir Benjamin Dove, Henry Woodward as Captain Ironsides, John Quick as Skiff, Thomas Hull as Old Goodwin, Robert Bensley as Philip, John Dunstall as Jonathan, James Perry as Francis, Jane Green as Lady Dove, Mary Ann Yates as Sophia, Mary Bulkley as Violetta and Isabella Mattocks as Lucy Waters. The Irish premiere took place at the Capel Street Theatre on 7 May 1770.

== Bibliography ==
- Greene, John C. Theatre in Dublin, 1745-1820: A Calendar of Performances, Volume 6. Lexington Books, 2011.
- Mudford, William. The Life of Richard Cumberland. Sherwood, Neely & Jones, 1812.
- Nettleton, George H. & Case, Arthur E. British Dramatists from Dryden to Sheridan. Southern Illinois University Press, 1975.
- Sherburne, George and Bond, Donald F. A Literary History of England, Volume III: The Restoration and Eighteenth Century. Routledge and Kegan Paul, 1967.
