= Robert Bensley =

English actor (c. 1740–1817)

Robert Bensley (c. 1740 – 1817) was an 18th-century English actor, of whom Charles Lamb in the Essays of Elia speaks with special praise.

== Life ==
His early life is obscure, but his family was not poor: an uncle, Sir William Bensley, was among the directors of the British East India Company. Robert may have attended Westminster School. He is said to have served in America as a lieutenant of marines, attaining his commission through the influence of another relative; in this capacity, he may have participated in theatrical entertainments for soldiers; one early biography mentions a role on Thomas Otway's The Orphan. He appears to have acted with troupes of strolling players, including those of Roger Kemble and another in Staffordshire.

In 1768 Johan Zoffany created a painting of Charles Macklin in the role of Shylock. Macklin's daughter Maria Macklin was included as Portia and Bensley as Bassiano in the painting and Jane Lessingham is at the foot of the dias. The painting is unusual in that it includes Lord Mansfield to the left who may have commissioned the painting which is now in The Tate in London.

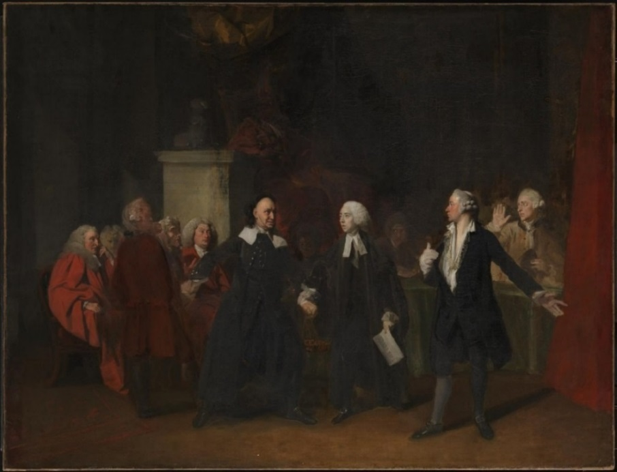
Charles Macklin as Shylock, Bensley as Bassiano and Maria Macklin as Portia. Jane Lessingham is in the part of Nerissa (pictured at the foot of the dais). Charles Macklin as Shylock by Johan Zoffany c. 1768.

After his departure from the military, he moved to London, where he met David Garrick and was engaged as an actor. He first appeared he appeared at Drury Lane in 1765, playing Pierre in Otway's Venice Preserv'd. He remained with Garrick in supporting roles; he played Edmund in King Lear and Buckingham in Richard III, and others; he also played the title role in The Guardian. The following season, he moved to Covent Garden, where he earned sixteen shillings a day working for George Colman the Elder. He stayed there for eight consecutive seasons, performing as Mosca in Ben Jonson's Volpone, Hubert in King John, Shore in Rowe's Jane Shore, and as Iago in Othello and Prospero in The Tempest.

In 1775, he returned to Drury Lane for the last year of Garrick's career; his first role was Pierre in Venice Preserv'd. He had by this time risen in prominence, so that his weekly pay was nearly ten pounds, with yearly benefit performances bringing in as much as 150 pounds. He remained at Drury Lane for the remainder of his career, although he sometimes performed during summers at the Haymarket, and occasionally acted at Bristol as well. he played important parts; though the fifth-ranked actor in the company by salary, he was a reliable performer with as many as 75 roles in his repertoire. In 1796, he retired. He played his final role, in Arthur Murphy's The Grecian Daughter, opposite Sarah Siddons: the benefit earned him 362 pounds.

At some point Benson is thought to have had an affair with the actress Isabella Mattocks. Mattocks marriage survived this liaison.

After retirement, Bensley appears to have served as paymaster at the Knightsbridge Barracks for a short time before retiring in 1798. The death of an uncle in 1809 left him financially secure for the last years of his life; he died at Stanmore in 1817 and is buried there. Though early rumor linked him to singer Isabella Mattocks, he did not marry until 1772, when he met Francina Augustina Cheston in Bristol after having accidentally caused her to fall from her horse. They may have had a daughter, Elizabeth, who married in Hanover Square in 1802.

The greatest praise for Bensley came from Lamb, whose description of the actor as Malvolio praises his "magnificent" air of "Spanish loftiness." Other critics were less laudatory. Even his defenders admitted that Bensley had to overcome notable physical deficiencies to make a mark as an actor: his eye and features were said to lack expressiveness, his voice was too nasal, and his movements too jerky and awkward. But if these qualities made him unsuited for many of the roles that the rigors of the repertory system thrust him into, they also worked to his advantage in roles that fit his style. Throughout his career, he excelled in roles that required rigidity and solemnity, whether artificial or not. As a doting parent or stern moralist, he was always in his element. (Lamb's praise of his Iago is decidedly unusual.) By the time of his retirement, his style (which reminded some of James Quin) had become quite thoroughly dated, supplanted by the more nuanced style of Garrick, who reputedly nicknamed Bensley "Roaring Bob."

He was at one time mistakenly associated with the family of printers of whom Thomas Bensley (died 1833) was the chief representative. On the stage he was simply Mr Bensley, but though he is named William and even Richard in some accounts, Mr Knight shows that his name was certainly Robert.

== Selected roles ==
- Knowell in The Oxonian in Town by George Colman the Elder (1767)
- Mithrades in Cyrus by John Hoole (1768)
- Leontine in The Good-Natur'd Man by Oliver Goldsmith (1768)
- Philip in The Brothers by Richard Cumberland (1769)
- Demaphoon in Timanthes by John Hoole (1770)
- Granville in Clementina by Hugh Kelly (1771)
- Don Carlos in Alzuma by Arthur Murphy (1773)
- Lycomedes in Cleonice, Princess of Bithynia by John Hoole (1775)
- Mr Drummond in The Runaway by Hannah Cowley (1776)
- Harold in The Battle of Hastings by Richard Cumberland (1778)
- Osman in Zoraida by William Hodson (1779)
- King in The Law of Lombardy by Robert Jephson (1779)
- Lord Glenmore in The Chapter of Accidents by Sophia Lee (1780)
- Omar in The Fair Circassian by Samuel Jackson Pratt (1781)
- Ruefull in The Natural Son by Richard Cumberland (1784)
- Demophon in The Royal Suppliants by John Delap (1786)
- Anthony Euston in I'll Tell You What by Elizabeth Inchbald (1785)
- Hilladon in The Captives by John Delap (1786)
- Dundore in Vimonda by Andrew Macdonald (1787)
- Durazzo in Julia by Robert Jephson (1787)
- Sterling in The Country Attorney by Richard Cumberland (1787)
- Leonidas in The Fate of Sparta by Hannah Cowley (1788)
- St. Pierre in The Surrender of Calais by George Colman the Younger (1791)
- Dunstan in Edwy and Elgiva by Fanny Burney (1795)
- Rodomsko in Zorinski by Thomas Morton (1795)
- Constantius in Vortigern and Rowena by William Henry Ireland (1796)
