= Cyrus (play) =

Play by John Hoole

- Original language: English
- Written by: John Hoole
- Genre: Tragedy

Premiere
- Date: 3 December 1768
- Place: Covent Garden Theatre, London

Cyrus is a 1768 tragedy by the British writer John Hoole.

The original Covent Garden cast included William Powell as Cyrus the Great, William Smith as Cambyses, Robert Bensley as Mithrades, Thomas Hull as Harpagus, Mary Ann Yates as Mandane of Media and Isabella Mattocks as Aspasia.

== Bibliography ==
- Nicoll, Allardyce. A History of English Drama 1660–1900: Volume III. Cambridge University Press, 2009.
- Hogan, C.B (ed.) The London Stage, 1660–1800: Volume V. Southern Illinois University Press, 1968.
