= Elizabeth Hartley (actress) =

British actress

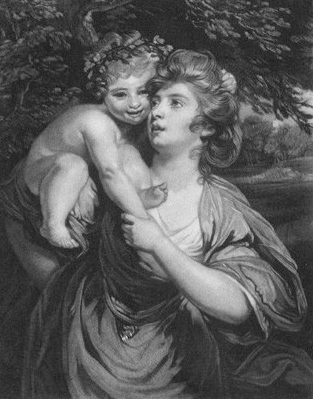
- Elizabeth Hartley by Joshua Reynolds
- Born: Elizabeth White; 1751; Berrow, Somerset, England
- Died: 1 February 1824 (aged 73); King Street, Woolwich, London, England
- Occupation: Actress

Elizabeth Hartley (née White) (1750?–1824) (Note: Baptismal records between 1745 and 1753 are absent from the parish records) was one of the most celebrated actresses on the London stage in the 18th century. She was also notorious for the role she played in society scandals including "The Vauxhall Affray".

== Life ==
Elizabeth Hartley was the daughter of James and Eleanor White of Berrow, Somerset, England. She later took the name Hartley, but it is not known from whom. Various suggestions have been made including the master to whom she was a chambermaid, and other actors of a similar name. There are also no reliable sources for her early roles until she appeared in Edinburgh, on 4 December 1771, as Monimia in Thomas Otway's The Orphan.

After a season in Edinburgh she moved to Bristol where David Garrick, who had heard of her remarkable beauty, commissioned the actor John Moody to attend a performance and report back to him. On 20 July 1772, Moody wrote:

Mrs. Hartley is a good figure, with a handsome, small face, and very much freckled; her hair red, and her neck and shoulders well turned. There is not the least harmony in her voice, but when forced (which she never fails to do on every occasion) is loud and strong, but such an inarticulate gabble that you must be well acquainted with her part to understand her. She is ignorant and stubborn.... She has a husband, a precious fool, who she heartily despises. She talks lusciously, and has a slovenly good nature about her that renders her prodigiously vulgar.

Since she was by this time already engaged to play at the Covent Garden theatre, this poor review was of no account. Meanwhile, Hartley had been living at the premises of Mrs Kelly, a well-known bawd and it can be assumed was also working for her.

Her first appearance at the Covent Garden theatre was as Jane Shore on 5 October 1772. It was said concerning her debut that "she is deserving of much praise, her figure is quite elegant, her countenance pleasing and expressive, her voice in general melodious, and her action just."

However, writing about her performance in her next role as Queen Catherine in Henry VIII the same journal wrote that she had "frequently sunk into a whining monotony which from the length of some of the speeches became very disagreeable".
These mixed reviews which praised her beauty but criticised her acting continued after she played Orellana: "her beautiful figure and sweet face, made every auditor wish that nature had given her a voice less dissonant, and monotonous".

In the summer of 1773 the events that became known as "The Vauxhall Affray" took place. A group of young men including Thomas Lyttelton, the notorious libertine, George Robert FitzGerald and Captain Crofts were involved in a drunken brawl which started in the Vauxhall Gardens where Hartley was walking with Rev Henry Bate (later Lord Dudley). Bate became incensed by the rudeness of the young men in staring at and making remarks about Hartley. Insults were exchanged, threats were made, and a duel was proposed. The affair culminated with a boxing match in a tavern. Owing to the notoriety of the people involved these events stimulated extensive debate and gossip and a pamphlet was published and circulated.

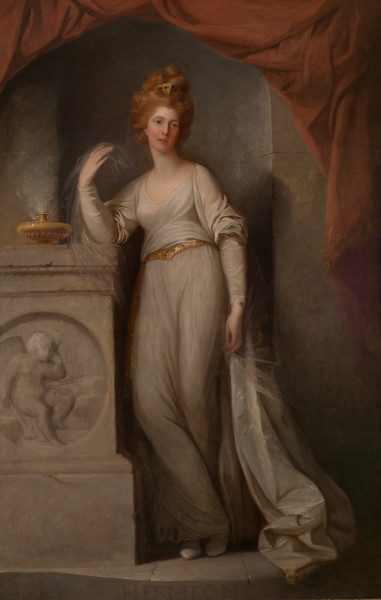
Elizabeth Hartley by Angelica Kauffmann in the role of Hermione which she played in 1774

In the following summer of 1774 Hartley again made the headlines when she absconded to France with William Smith who played her on-stage lover in Henry II or The Fall of Rosamond. They travelled on to Cork, Ireland where they acted together. They both returned to London for the autumn season.

Her looks were more often praised than her acting, but she was popular with audiences. Her portrait was depicted by many artists including Joshua Reynolds, George Romney, John Downman, John Keyse Sherwin and Angelica Kauffman.

"She was a very beautiful woman, and a good actress in parts that were not beyond her powers; her forte was tenderness, not rage".

"A finer creature than Mrs Hartley I never saw – her make is perfect."

"Mrs Hartley, who in all her golden beauty acted the lovely interest of Miss Neville. The author could not have wished a more perfect face and form ..."

She worked at the Covent Garden theatre in a numerous roles until 1780 (see below), and also appeared at Drury Lane, Liverpool and Stroud. She left the stage at the close of the season of 1779–80 when aged only 30, possibly due to ill health. There is no record of the rest of her life until she died at King Street, Woolwich, on 1 February 1824. She was buried on 6 February under the name of White. Her will left £100 to the Covent Garden Theatrical Fund.

== Roles ==
=== Edinburgh 1771–1772 ===
- Monimia: The Orphan
- Desdemona: Othello
- Cordelia: King Lear
- Almeria: The Mourning Bride
- Angelica: The Constant Wife
- Belvidera: Venice Preserv'd
- Calista: The Fair Penitent
- Constance: George Farquhar's The Twin Rivals
- Lady Percy: Henry IV, Part 1
- Mary Queen of Scots: Bank's The Albion Queens
- Anne Bullen: Henry VIII

=== Bristol 1772 ===
- Jane Shore: Nicholas Rowe's The Tragedy of Jane Shore
- Indiana: The Conscious Lovers
- Louisa Dudley: The West Indian
- Euphrasia: Murphy's The Grecian Daughter

=== London 1772–1780 ===
- Jane Shore: Nicholas Rowe's The Tragedy of Jane Shore, October 1772
- Queen Catherine: Henry VIII November 1772
- Elfrida: Mason's tragedy Elfrida, November 1772
- Orellana: Murphy's Alzuma, Feb 1773
- Alcmena: Amphitryon, March 1773
- Statira: Nathaniel Lee's The Rival Queens, March 1773
- Lady Macbeth Macbeth, March 1773
- Ismena: John Hoole's Timanthes, April 1773
- Cleopatra: All for Love April 1773
- Portia: Julius Caesar, May 1773
- Juliet: Romeo and Juliet, May 1773
- Rosamond: Thomas Hull's Henry II or The Fall of Rosamond, May 1773
- Hermione: The Winter's Tale, 1774
- Mariamne: Samuel Pordage's Herod and Mariamne, 1774
- Almeyda: Dryden's Don Sebastian, 1774
- Lady Jane Grey: Nicholas Rowe's Lady Jane Grey
- Cleonice: Hoole's Cleonice, March 1775
- Evelina: Mason's Caractacus, December 1776
- Isabella: Savage's Sir Thomas Overbury, February 1777
- Miss Neville: Murphy's Know Your Own Mind, February 1777
- Rena: Buthred, December 1778
- Julia: Hannah More's The Fatal Falsehood, May 1779
- Lady Frances Touchwood: Hannah Cowley's The Belle's Stratagem, Feb 1780
- Rutland: Henry Jones's The Earl of Essex
- Andromache: Ambrose Philips's The Distress's Mother
- Marcia: Cato
- Ethelinda: Nicholas Rowe's The Royal Convert
- Olivia: Twelfth Night
- Miss Willoughby: A Word to the Wise
- Sigismunda: James Thomson's Tancred and Sigismunda
- Leonora: The Revenge (attributed to Aphra Behn)
- The Abbess: The Comedy of Errors
- The Queen: Richard III
- Eudocia: John Hughes's Siege of Damascus
- Agapea: Richard Cumberland's Widow of Delphi

== Portraiture ==
(An incomplete list of portraits which can be viewed on the web)

- Richard Houston, after Hugh Douglas Hamilton, (1771) Mrs Hartly
- Joshua Reynolds, (1771) Mrs Hartley as a Nymph with a Young Bacchus
- Maria Anna Angelica Catherina Kauffman, (1774) Hermione
- Joshua Reynolds,(1772?) Elizabeth Hartley (1751–1824) as Rowe's Jane Shore
- after Edward Fisher, (1776) Elizabeth Hartley
- Mrs Hartley as Andromache in "The Distrest Mother", (1777)
- Walker, after Daniel Dodd, (1777) Mrs. HARTLEY in the Character of MARCIA
- James Caldwall, by S. Smith, after George Carter, (1783) Immortality of Garrick
- Samuel William Reynolds, after Sir Joshua Reynolds, (1834) Mrs Hartley
