= Alzuma =

1773 play

- Written by: Arthur Murphy
- Original language: English
- Genre: Tragedy
- Setting: Cusco, Peru

Premiere
- Date premiered: 23 February 1773
- Place premiered: Theatre Royal, Covent Garden, London

Alzuma is a 1773 historical tragedy by the Irish writer Arthur Murphy. It premiered in London at the Theatre Royal, Covent Garden on 23 February 1773. The original cast included William 'Gentleman' Smith as Alzuma, Thomas Hull as Pizarro, Robert Bensley as Don Carlos and Elizabeth Hartley as Orellana. The music was composed for the production by Thomas Arne. It is based on the Conquest of Peru by Francisco Pizarro in the sixteenth century. Murphy suggested that the British victory at Havana in 1762 influenced his sympathetic depiction of the Peruvians and hostility to Spain. Richard Brinsley Sheridan's later play Pizarro dealt with the same subject and themes.

== Bibliography ==
- Emery, John Pike. Arthur Murphy: An Eminent English Dramatist of the Eighteenth Century. University of Pennsylvania Press, 1946.
- Greene, John C. Theatre in Dublin, 1745-1820: A Calendar of Performances, Volume 6. Lexington Books, 2011.
- Nicoll, Allardyce. A History of English Drama 1660–1900: Volume III. Cambridge University Press, 2009.
- Hogan, C.B (ed.) The London Stage, 1660–1800: Volume V. Southern Illinois University Press, 1968.
