= The School for Guardians =

1767 play

- Original language: English
- Written by: Arthur Murphy
- Genre: Comedy
- Setting: London, present day

Premiere
- Date: 10 January 1767
- Place: Theatre Royal, Covent Garden, London

The School for Guardians is a 1767 comedy play by the Irish writer Arthur Murphy. It premiered at the Theatre Royal, Covent Garden in London on 10 January 1767. The original cast included John Walker as Sir Theodore Brumpton, Henry Woodward as Young Brumpton, William Smith as Bellford, Edward Shuter as Oldcastle, John Dunstall as Lovibond, Mary Wilford as Harriet and Ann Elliot as Mary Ann. In 1777 Thomas Hull adapted it into a comic opera Love finds the Way with music composed for the production by Thomas Arne.

== Bibliography ==
- Emery, John Pike. Arthur Murphy: An Eminent English Dramatist of the Eighteenth Century. University of Pennsylvania Press, 1946.
- Nicoll, Allardyce. A History of English Drama 1660–1900: Volume III. Cambridge University Press, 2009.
- Hogan, C.B (ed.) The London Stage, 1660–1800: Volume V. Southern Illinois University Press, 1968.
