= Zoraida (play) =

1779 play

- Original language: English
- Written by: William Hodson
- Genre: Tragedy

Premiere
- Date: 13 December 1779
- Place: Theatre Royal, Drury Lane

Zoraida is a tragedy by British writer William Hodson based on the conquest of Egypt by Ottoman ruler Selim I (1779). The original Drury Lane cast included William 'Gentleman' Smith as Almaimon, Robert Bensley as Osman, James Aickin as Zirvad, John Phillimore as Heli, John Hayman Packer as Moralmin, John Palmer as Selim and Mary Ann Yates as Zoraida.

== Synopsis ==
=== Act 1 ===
Scene 1: Zoraida, a female orphan at the court of Egypt, talks to her friend Zulima (daughter of Moralmin, the Governor of Cairo for Almaimon and who grew up with Zoraida) about her worries regarding her parents' past against the rule of Ottoman Emperor Selim the First. She is concealed by his adopted parents and fears that Almaimon will die. Zulima comforts her by reminding her of Almorad's affection to Zoraida as an adopted parent.

Scene 2: Moralmin talks to Zoraida is eager to share his rosy expectations for Almaimon reclaiming Egypt. Zulima suggests to Zoraida to join the fight; however, Zoraida suggests for Zulima to pray to Allah to wish the soldiers good luck.

Scene 3: Almaimon faces a tough fight and senses the defeat of his army. He worries about Zoraida.

Scene 4: Moralmin, now a prisoner of Selim I, is questioned by Selim, and confesses his loyalty for Almaimon despite his capture. He curses the Selim.

Scene 5: Osman seemingly shows his loyalty to Selim while secretly seeking vengeance.

Scene 6: At the castle, despite Zulima's persuasions, Zoraida has a pessimistic view of the battle and tries to give up, but changes her mind after realizing she does not wish to become a captive.

Scene 7: The situation escalates as the betrayal of Almaimon's troops exacerbates the battle on Almaimon's side.

Scene 8: Motafar notifies the crew of the princess's escape as well as his support for their escape.

=== Act 2 ===
Zoraida comes before Selim as a captive and is taken to his harem. Selim tries to steal her heart, which, unbeknownst to him, is what Osman intends to distract Sultan from noticing his plans. Meanwhile, Almaimon is saddened by Zoraida's capture. Almaimon receives a scroll about Osman, which would later help with his mission of liberating Egypt and freeing Zoraida. Almaimon meets Osman and tells him his risky plans: an attack while the guards sleep.

=== Act 4 ===
Zoraida hears false testimony from Zulima that Almaimon is murdered. Zulima worries that her sire Moralmin is dead. Meanwhile, Selim feels betrayed by Osman for the rescue mission, saying he would be noble. However, Selim decides to trust Osman one more time to persuade Almaimon.

=== Act5 ===
Selim returns Zoraida to Almaimon. Almaimon thanks God for their reunion.

== Sources ==
- Nicoll, Allardyce. A History of English Drama 1660-1900: Volume III. Cambridge University Press, 2009.
- Hogan, C.B (ed.) The London Stage, 1660-1800: Volume V. Southern Illinois University Press, 1968.
