= The Perplexities =

1767 comedy play by Thomas Hull

- Original language: English
- Written by: Thomas Hull
- Genre: Comedy

Premiere
- Date: 31 February 1767
- Place: Covent Garden Theatre, London

The Perplexities is a 1767 comedy play by the British actor and writer Thomas Hull. It was a reworking of an earlier Restoration-era play Adventures of Five Hours by Samuel Tuke, itself based on an original Spanish work.

The original Covent Garden cast included Hull himself as Don Juan, William Smith as Don Antonio, David Ross as Don Henriquez, George Mattocks as Don Florio, John Cushing as Ernesto, Maria Macklin as Honoria, Mary Bulkley as Felicia and Jane Green as Rosa.

== Bibliography ==
- Baines, Paul & Ferarro, Julian & Rogers, Pat. The Wiley-Blackwell Encyclopedia of Eighteenth-Century Writers and Writing, 1660-1789. Wiley-Blackwell, 2011.
- Watson, George. The New Cambridge Bibliography of English Literature: Volume 2, 1660-1800. Cambridge University Press, 1971.
