= Timanthes (play) =

1770 play

- Original language: English
- Written by: John Hoole
- Genre: Tragedy

Premiere
- Date: 24 March 1770
- Place: Covent Garden Theatre, London

Timanthes is a 1770 tragedy by the British writer John Hoole.

The original Covent Garden cast included William Smith as Timanthes, Robert Bensley as Demaphoon, Richard Wroughton as Cherinthus, Mary Bulkley as Cephisa and Mary Ann Yates as Ismena.

== Bibliography ==
- Nicoll, Allardyce. A History of English Drama 1660–1900: Volume III. Cambridge University Press, 2009.
- Hogan, C.B (ed.) The London Stage, 1660–1800: Volume V. Southern Illinois University Press, 1968.
