= William Lawranson =

English painter

William Lawranson or Lawrenson (baptised 1742, died in or after 1783) was an English painter and engraver.

== Life ==
He was the son of Thomas Lawranson. In 1760 and 1761 he obtained premiums from the Society of Arts. He was, like his father, a fellow of the Incorporated Society of Artists.

== Works ==
Lawranson first exhibited with the Incorporated Society in 1762, sending a portrait. In 1763 and 1764 he sent portraits to the Free Society of Artists, but in 1766 returned to the Incorporated Society and continued to exhibit there till 1772. He sent mostly crayon portraits, including in 1771 one of William Smith the actor as Iachimo, which he engraved himself in mezzotint, and in 1769 one of Sophia Baddeley. From 1774 till 1780 he exhibited at the Royal Academy.

Many of Lawranson's pictures were engraved, including:

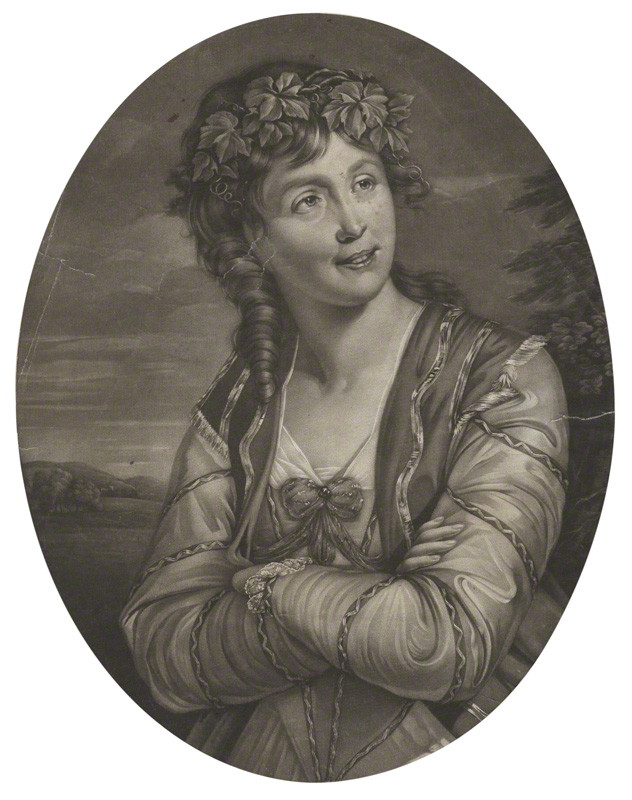
Portrait of Ann Catley, engraving after William Lawranson

- Ann Catley as "Euphrosyne", by Robert Dunkarton;
- Signora Giovanna Sestini, the opera singer, by John Jones;
- Benjamin West by William Pether;
- Sir Eyre Coote by J. Walker; and
- A Lady Haymaking, Palemon and Lavinia, Rosalind and Celia, Cymon and Iphigenia by John Raphael Smith.

== Notes ==
Attribution

This article incorporates text from a publication now in the public domain: Lee, Sidney, ed. (1892). "Lawrenson, Thomas". Dictionary of National Biography. Vol. 32. London: Smith, Elder & Co.
