= An Essay on the Life and Genius of Samuel Johnson =

An Essay on the Life and Genius of Samuel Johnson, LL. D. was written by Arthur Murphy and published in 1792. The work serves as a biography of Samuel Johnson and an introduction to his works included in the volume. Murphy also wrote a biography for Henry Fielding in a 1762 edition of his Works and a biography for David Garrick, the Life of David Garrick, in 1801.

== Background ==
Murphy first met Johnson during the summer of 1754. Murphy was working on the Gray's-Inn Journal and, after discovering that a French article that they wanted to print was actually a translation of Johnson's Rambler No. 190, came to Johnson to apologize for his error. The two soon became friends, and Murphy began to tell the story many times later. Murphy was also friends with Henry Thrale and Hester Thrale, and spent time with all three.

After Johnson died and John Hawkins published his Life of Samuel Johnson, Arthur Murphy began to attack the work. He used a Monthly Review piece to criticize the legalistic language employed by Hawkins to claim "that he is now rendered an incompetent critic thereby, and in consequence thereof".

It was first published in 1792 as a prefix to a 12 volumes octavo edition that included Johnson's Works. This was done in a similar manner to Hawkins work which was prefixed to an eleven volume edition of Johnson's Works. Murphy, at the beginning of his essay, claims, "The proprietors of Johnson's Works thought [Hawkin's] life, which they prefixed to their former edition, too unwieldy for republication". Murphy was paid 300 pounds for the Essay.

== Essay ==
Murphy begins his essay by writing on the nature of biographical accounts:

"When the works of a great Writer, who has bequeathed to posterity a lasting legacy, are presented to the world, it is naturally expected, that some account of his life should accompany the edition. The Reader wishes to know as much as possible of the Author. The circumstances that attended him, the features of his private character, his conversation, and the means by which he rose to eminence, become the favourite objects of enquiry. curiousity [sic] is excited; and the admirer of his works is eager to know his private opinions, his course of study, the particularities of his conduct, and, above all, whether he pursued the wisdom which he recommends, and practised the virtue which his writings inspire. A principle of gratitude is awakened in every generous mind. For the entertainment and instruction which genius and diligence have provided for the world, men of refined and sensible tempers are ready to pay their tribute of praise, and even to form a posthumous friendship with the author. In reviewing the life of such a writer, there is, besides a rule of justice to which the publick have an undoubted claim. Fond admiration and partial friendship should not be suffered to represent his virtues with exaggeration; nor should malignity be allowed, under a specious disguise, to magnify mere defects, the usual failing of human nature, into vice or gross deformity. The lights and shades of the character should be given; and, if this be done with a strict regard to truth, a just estimate of Dr. Johnson will afford a lesson perhaps as valuable as the moral doctrine that speaks with energy in every page of his works.

Before he begins, Murphy questions, "After so many essays and volumes of Johnsoniana, what remains for the present writer? Perhaps, what has not been attempted; a short, yet full, a faithful, yet temperate history of Dr. Johnson".

== Critical response ==
Dr Campbell, an Irish clergyman, complained about the vulgarity of Murphy's recollections of Johnson's actions: "Murphy gave it - on Garrick;s authority - that when it was asked what was the greatest pleasure, Johnson answered f***ing, and the second was drinking. And therefore, he wondered why there were not more drunkards, for all could drink though all could not f***"
