= Clementina (play) =

1771 play

- Original language: English
- Written by: Hugh Kelly
- Genre: Tragedy
- Setting: Italy

Premiere
- Date: 23 February 1771
- Place: Theatre Royal, Covent Garden, London

Clementina is a tragic play by the Irish writer Hugh Kelly, first staged at Theatre Royal, Covent Garden in February 1771. The plot follows the marriage of a young Italian woman Clementina and her lover Rinaldo, despite her father's opposition to the wedding as he had wished her to marry Palermo. It ends with Palmero killing Rinaldo, and Clementina committing suicide in her despair.

In the History of Drama, Allardyce Nicoll describes it as "a poor dull pseudo-classic production, in spite of its Italian scene". The original cast included Mary Ann Yates as Clementina, Robert Bensley as Granville and Richard Wroughton as Palermo.

== Bibliography ==
- Nicoll, Allardyce. A History of English Drama 1660-1900. Volume III: Late Eighteenth Century Drama. Cambridge University Press, 1952.
