= The Citizen (play) =

1761 play

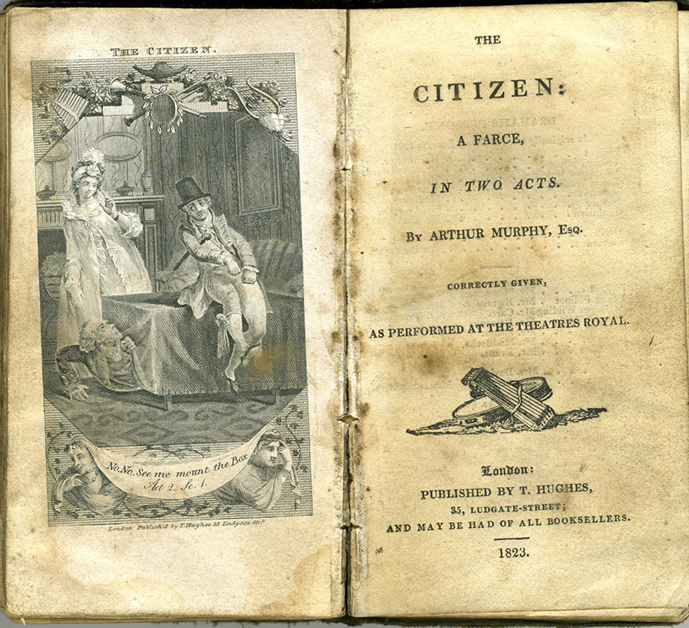
- Original language: English
- Written by: Arthur Murphy
- Genre: Comedy

Premiere
- Date: 2 July 1761
- Place: Theatre Royal, Covent Garden, London

The Citizen is a 1761 comedy play by the Irish writer Arthur Murphy. A farce it was first staged at the Theatre Royal, Covent Garden in London on 2 July 1761. Another of Murphy's works The Old Maid was staged as the afterpiece The original cast included Edward Shuter as Old Philpot, Henry Woodward as Young Philpot, John Dunstall as Sir Jasper Wilding, Patrick Costollo as Dapper, James Perry as Quilldrive, Ann Elliot as Maria and Elizabeth Davies as Corinna. The Dublin premiere took place at the Crow Street Theatre on 11 November 1761.

== Plot ==
Philpot, a wealthy skinflint, has bargained with Sir Jasper Wilding, a fox hunter, for his son Young Philpot, a buck and wastrel, to marry Maria Wilding, and for his daughter Sally to marry Wilding's son, for settlements and twenty thousand pounds paid to Sir Jasper. Young Philpot has lost a fortune, but borrows money from his father and embarks on an insurance fraud involving shipwrecked goods. Maria plans to marry Beaufort, who loves her. As Young Philpot tries to propose, she convinces him she is half-witted, and he spurns her. In the second act, Philpot senior is visiting Corinna, a lady of loose virtue, but hides under the table when his son calls upon her. He overhears as Young Philpot tells her how he has cajoled the money out of his father. Maria's brother surprises them, and old Philpot is also discovered, to their mutual shame. In the final scene Sir Jasper with a lawyer obtains Philpot's signature to the agreements, but meanwhile Maria, an educated girl, shows her strong character to Young Philpot and he again refuses to propose. Having signed away his rights old Philpot offers to marry her, but the lawyer reveals himself as Beaufort, and explains that he has swapped the deeds, so that Philpot has unwittingly signed his agreement for Maria to marry Beaufort.

== Bibliography ==
- Emery, John Pike. Arthur Murphy: An Eminent English Dramatist of the Eighteenth Century. University of Pennsylvania Press, 1946.
- Nicoll, Allardyce. A History of English Drama 1660–1900: Volume III. Cambridge University Press, 2009.
- Hogan, C.B (ed.) The London Stage, 1660–1800: Volume V. Southern Illinois University Press, 1968.
