= The Haunted Tower =

- by Stephen Storace
- Librettist: James Cobb
- Language: English
- Premiere: 24 November 1789; Theatre Royal, Drury Lane

The Haunted Tower is an opera composed by Stephen Storace to a libretto by James Cobb. It was first performed in London at the Theatre Royal, Drury Lane on 24 November 1789. It was one of Storace's more popular works, remaining among Drury Lane's repertoire for 30 years. The printed vocal score went through five editions, attesting to its popularity.

Typical of 18th century British operas, nearly all the action of The Haunted Tower takes place during the dialogue. Although the music of the opera serves no dramatic function, Storace and Cobb would incorporate action into the musical pieces in their later works.

== List of characters ==
Names are those of the first performers.

- Lord William — Michael Kelly
- Baron of Oakland — Robert Baddeley
- Robert, the Baron's butler — Charles Dignum
- Edward, the Baron's son — John Bannister
- Lewis, servant to Lord William — Richard Suett
- Martin, Maud's grandson — Matthew Williames
- De Courcy, brother to Lady Elinor — John Whitfield
- Charles — Thomas Sedgwick
- Hugo, long-time servant to the House of Oakland — John Moody
- Hubert — Alexander Webb
- Servant — John Lyons
- Lady Elinor, betrothed to the Baron of Oakland — Anna Maria Crouch
- Adela — Anna Selina Storace
- Cicely, friend of Lady Elinor — Maria Bland
- Maud, owner of the cottage near Dover's shore — Ursula Agnes Booth

== Synopsis ==
Act I

- Scene I: The Sea, Dover Cliffs and Castle---Thunder and Lightning.

After a storm (portrayed in the overture), various people disembark from a ship that has landed at Dover ("To Albion's genius raise the strain"). Among them are Lady Elinor and her friend Cicely. Elinor is distraught: Her father wants her to marry the Baron of Oakland, although she is in love with Sir Palamede. With her attendants, Lady Elinor goes to warm herself in a nearby cottage owned by Maud. Lord William also disembarks and, in speaking to his servant Lewis, reveals that he is in disguise as Sir Palamede. He was on the same ship at Lady Elinor but avoided her, knowing that she is promised to the Baron of Oakland. In love with her, he laments his fate ("From Hope's fond dream tho' Reason wake").

- Scene II: The inside of Maud's cottage.

Inside the cottage Lord William (who everyone thinks is Sir Palamede) takes Lady Elinor by surprise and explains he was on the same ship as her. She laments their predicament ("Tho' pity I cannot deny") as she exits. Maud appears and offers her grandson Martin to lead Sir Palamede (really Lord William) to the Baron of Oakland. Maud knew the current Baron before he appropriated his title when he was just Edmund the ploughman. Maud relates that Edmund achieved his position because the previous baron, Lord William, was banished (with his son) due to rumor of a plot to take the life of William the Conqueror. On his deathbed, the accuser declared Lord William innocent. Thus Sir Palamede (really Lord William) has come to reclaim his estate. Cicely observes the mysteriousness of Palamede's presence and remarks on the differences between women and men ("Nature to woman still so kind").

- Scene III: A Rural Prospect---A Cottage

Robert, a servant to the Baron of Oakland, enters accompanied by his huntsmen "Hark! the sweet horn proclaims afar"). He inquires of Edward's health, but Edward is distracted by seeing Adela through a window, whom he loves. He alludes to a secret that involves the Haunted Tower on Oakland Castle. The Baron of Oakland enters, boasting of his pride and that he is known as the terror of the neighbourhood. The Baron reminds his son Edward that the Lord de Courcy's daughter will make an appropriate wife, although Edward appears disinterested. After the Baron leaves Edward goes to Adela's cottage, knocks, then hides himself. Adela opens the door, wondering who knocked ("Whither, my love! ah! whither art thou gone!"). Edward then reveals himself. In dialogue with Adela, Edward states that his father does not act like a true baron and that he himself has not been swayed by the presumed rise in station. Adela and Edward sing of their mutual affection ("Will great lords and ladies").

- Scene IV: A Field

De Courcy, accompanied by his attendants, wonders whether his sister Lady Elinor was on the ship that recently docked. A servant Charles replies that she is headed toward the Baron of Oakland and that "Sir Palamede" is with her. This distresses De Courcy who asks Charles to gain as much intelligence as he can in order to avenge his family. Left alone, Charles proclaims that he will spy out of duty, but prefers to rejoin the woman he left behind in France ("My native land I bade adieu").

- Scene V: The inside of Maud's Cottage

Lady Elinor tells Lord William (who she still believes is Sir Palamede) that she does not want to marry the Baron of Oakland. Not wanting to disobey her father, she will delay the marriage as long as possible. Cicely has a plan to go to the Baron as Lady Elinor's attendant until her father communicates with her. The three commiserate ("Against the shaft of cruel fate").

Act II

- Scene I: An Apartment in the Castle

The servant Hugo reveals to Robert that he's served in the Oakland Castle long enough to witness three heads of the estate. In preparation for the wedding, Robert asks Hugo whether he's ever seen Lady Elinor. Hugo has not, but knows that she's beautiful, and leaves. Robert fetches Adela who is nervous pretending that she is Lady Elinor. Left alone, Adela knows she needs more confidence to pass as Lady Elinor ("Be mine, tender passion, soother of care"). Robert returns with the Baron of Oakland who assumes he is meeting Lady Elinor. A moment of embarrassment ensues until the Baron, frustrated that he does not have a prepared speech, is able to speak haltingly a few awkward words to Lady Elinor (who is really Adela). Unlike the Baron's, Adela is well well-spoken. She makes numerous allusions to people who pretend to be whom they are not which frustrates and embarrasses the Baron. Edward enters and the Baron asks him to speak to Lady Elinor appropriately. Edward, also in on Adela's disguise, acts familiarly with Adela. His forthrightness surprises the Baron.

- Scene II: A view near the Castle

Outside of Oakland Castle, Sir Palamede (really Lord William) tells Lady Elinor to keep up the disguise. Not realizing that Sir Palamede is Lord William, Lady Elinor rhetorically asks whether Palamede recommends disguise ("Hush, hush; such counsels do not give"). Cicely arrives, followed by the Baron of Oakland. Wanting to know who are the two, Cicely tells the Baron that Lady Elinor is Lady Elinor's lady-in-waiting, and that Lord William is Sir Palamede, a jester. The Baron does not think much of the occupation of jester, but Lord William responds that "satire well applied, is the medicine of the mind" and sings a song underscoring that adage ("Tho' time has from your lordship's face"). Brushing off slights to his reputation, the Baron asks why are Lady Elinor'servants outside the castle when Lady Elinor is inside the castle. Realizing that someone is impersonating Lady Elinor, the group chooses to maintain their disguises. Lewis, a servant to Lord William (who is aware of his disguise), enters with letters for the Lord. As Lord William and Lady Elinor exit, Lewis remarks on their mutual love and suggests to Cicely they too could partake of such mutual affection. But Cicely responds that she is too independent to get married ("What blest hours, untainted by sorrow").

- Scene III: An Apartment in the Castle.

Edward is preparing for the wedding ("Now all in preparation"). Adela enters and the two engage in bantering and arguing until Robert enters. Edward changes his mood from one of argument to the upcoming wedding ("While swords and shields are clashing").

- Scene IV: An Antique Hall, a State Chair; several People discovered, Tenants, Servants, etc.

Lord William and Lady Elinor verify among Cicely, Charles and Lewis that their disguises are still holding. Adela, Edward and Robert enter and the group sings a sextet extolling love ("By mutual love delighted"). The Baron enters and begins a speech but stumbles over the words. He is called away, while the group concludes the sextet.

- Scene V: A Room in the Castle

De Courcy mentions to Baron of Oakland that his sister (Lady Elinor), who the baron is supposed to marry, is in love with Sir Palamede. The Baron recognizes that something must be done.

- Scene VI: The kitchen, tenants and servants discovered at different tables---at the upper end an Ox, roasting, coos, etc. basting it.

Robert extols the food being prepared for the wedding ("Now mighty roast beef is the Englishman's food"). Lord William, Lady Elinor, and Cicely enter and the ensemble closes the act extolling love ("Love's sweet voice to Hymen speaking").

Act III

- Scene I: A Room in the Castle.

In dialogue with Charles, De Courcy reveals that he has surrounded Oakland Castle to prevent Sir Palamede from leaving, although he expresses a doubt about Palamede's guilt. Charles ruminates on honour ("Where'er true valour can its power display"). The Baron of Oakland re-enters with De Courcy, plotting to capture Sir Palamede. They have heard the villagers have been taking up arms and, noting the frequency of messages Sir Palamede has been sending and receiving, assume that he is fomenting a potential uprising.

Edward enters, somewhat intoxicated, and says he is to marry Lady Elinor, who prefers ale to wine. Adela enters (still disguised as Lady Elinor) and although Edward keeps up the charade, De Courcy immediately recognizes that the woman is not his sister. He leaves the Baron, who also leaves but not before puzzling whether he should be insulted or not. Left along, Edward banters with Adela who affirms her love for him ("Love from the heart, all its danger concealing").

- Scene II: The Sea at the back of the stage and a light-house; a part of the Tower is seen, the cellar door by the second wing; a little further, a flight of stairs leading to a door; stage lights down

Lady Elinor enters, followed by Lord William (whom she still thinks is Sir Palamede). She worries that something is about to happen but Lord William tries to reassure her ("Dangers unknown impending"). She leaves and Hugo enters, happy to see his master Lord William after a long time. Lord William assures Hugo that confirmation from the King of England is on the way that he is the rightful heir of Oakland Castle. He has followers who are prepared to overtake the castle at the right time. Hugo reveals to William that his late father's armour has been left in a specific room, but that no one has entered the room since his death. He relates that there have been noises coming from the room. Just then a light appears and a noise is heard from the room. William goes to find who's there while. As Hugo leaves he's seen by the Baron of Oakland who surmises that Hugo is part of Sir Palamede's plot. He leaves as Robert and Martin enter, intoxicated from having raided the wine cellar. They leave in search of Lewis.

- Scene III: A Room in the Castle.

With Cicely present, Lady Elinor worries about Sir Palamede's fate ("Dread parent of despair"). Cicely responds that, while high birth is an advantage, there are also advantages to not having such a station ("From high birth and all its fetters"). Adela and Robert enter, and Lady Elinor, still pretending to be her own lady-in-waiting, pester Adela (who is pretending to be Lady Elinor) to see if her needs are met ("Begone; I discharge you! away from my sight!").

- Scene IV: A chamber in the Tower, folding doors in the back Scene, and arch leading to another apartment, thro' which enter Lord William

Upon entering the chamber in the tower, Lord William discovers his father's armour and invokes his assistance ("Spirit of my sainted sire"). He hides within the room as Lewis, Robert and Martin enter and set about drinking ("As now we're met, a jolly set"). As they sing they hear their voice echoing (really Lord William behind a screen). Their revelry is interrupted by Baron of Oakland who berates them for drinking. He asks them whether they've seen evidence of the haunted presence and Robert affirms they have. He sings a line and they hear the echo. When the tower bell tolls, Lord William emerges from behind the screen, dressed in his father's armour. The Baron immediately recognizes the elder Baron of Oakland and is scared. Lewis declares that armed men are fighting. The Baron leaves to investigate.

- Scene V: An Apartment in the Castle, drums and trumpets without.

Adela and Edward speak of the misery of portraying upper class. The Baron enters, warning of the fighting but avoiding it. Lady Elinor (who the Baron still thinks is a lady-in-waiting) shames the Baron for not fighting and asks the whereabouts of her brother, before leaving. The Baron is puzzled by the reference but Adela clarifies that the lady-in-waiting is really Lady Elinor. A servant enters warning that the castle gates are being breached. The Baron suspects he'll die of fright before he dies by the sword.

- Scene VI: Changes to the Hall, after alarms of drums and trumpets.

Edward and Adela fear that they will be casualties of the fighting. De Courcy enters, congratulating Lord William and his knights; apparently all disguises have been revealed. They are followed by Lady Elinor, Cicely and Charles. De Courcy presents Lord William to Lady Elinor, saying that he is the person their father contracted her to marry. Two men enter restraining the Baron who now recognizes the deception but pleads for clemency. Lord William responds that he wants the Baron's friendship. He wishes success to Adela and Edward (who are thankful they no longer have to pretend). All sing for happy times ("The banished ills of heretofore").

== Songs ==
Act I

- To Albion's genius raise the strain — Chorus
- From Hope's fond dream tho' Reason wake — Lord William
- Tho' pity I cannot deny (composed by Pleyel) - Lady Elinor
- Nature to woman still so kind (Welsh tune) — Cicely
- Whither, my love! ah! whither art thou gone! (composed by Paisiello) — Adela
- Will great lords and ladies — Adela and Edward
- My native land I bade adieu — Charles
- Against the shaft of cruel fate — Lord William, Cicely and Lady Elinor

Act II

- Be mine, tender passion, soother of care — Adela
- Hush, hush; such counsels do not give (composed by Sarti) — Lady Elinor
- Tho' time has from your lordship's face (French tune) — Lord William
- What blest hours, untainted by sorrow (composed by Linley) — Cicely
- Now all in preparation (French tune) — Edward
- While swords and shields are clashing — Edward
- By mutual love delighted — Adela, Lady Elinor, Cicely, Lord William, Edward and Charles
- Now mighty roast beef is the Englishman's food — Robert
- Finale, Act 2: Love's sweet voice to Hymen speaking — Company

Act III

- Where'er true valour can its power display — Charles
- Love from the heart, all its danger concealing — Adela
- Dangers unknown impending — Lord William and Lady Elinor
- Dread parent of despair — Lady Elinor
- From high birth and all its fetters — Cicely
- Begone; I discharge you! away from my sight! — Lady Elinor and Adela
- Spirit of my sainted sire — Lord William
- As now we're met, a jolly set — Robert, Lewis and Martin
- Finale: The banished ills of heretofore — Company
