= The School for Arrogance =

1791 play

- Original language: English
- Written by: Thomas Holcroft
- Genre: Comedy

Premiere
- Date: 4 February 1791
- Place: Covent Garden Theatre, London

The School for Arrogance is a 1791 comedy play by the British writer Thomas Holcroft.

The original Covent Garden cast included William Thomas Lewis as Count Conolly Villars, John Henry Johnstone as MacDermot, Francis Aickin as Mr Dorimont, William Farren as Edmund, Richard Wilson as Sir Paul Peckham, Joseph Shepherd Munden as Sir Samuel Sheepy, James Thompson as Exempt, Charles Farley as Footmen, Mary Wells as Lucy and Isabella Mattocks as Lady Peckham.

== Bibliography ==
- Nicoll, Allardyce. A History of English Drama 1660–1900: Volume III. Cambridge University Press, 2009.
- Hogan, C.B (ed.) The London Stage, 1660–1800: Volume V. Southern Illinois University Press, 1968.
