= Mary Whitfield =

British stage actress

Mary Whitfield (died 1795) was a British stage actress.

She was born Mary Lane, but following her marriage to John Whitfield she appeared on the stage as Mrs Whitfield. She acted in Leicester and Norwich before moving to London in 1774, where she was variously part of the Covent Garden, Drury Lane and Haymarket companies. Primarily known for her comedy roles, she also played Shakespearean parts on occasion.

== Bibliography ==
- Cox, Jeffrey N. & Gamer, Michael. The Broadview Anthology of Romantic Drama. Broadview Press, 2003.
- Highfill, Philip H, Burnim, Kalman A. & Langhans, Edward A. A Biographical Dictionary of Actors, Actresses, Musicians, Dancers, Managers, and Other Stage Personnel in London, 1660-1800. SIU Press, 1973.
- Straub, Kristina, G. Anderson, Misty and O'Quinn, Daniel . The Routledge Anthology of Restoration and Eighteenth-Century Drama. Taylor & Francis, 2017.
