= The Fate of Sparta =

Play by Hannah Cowley

- Original language: English
- Written by: Hannah Cowley
- Genre: Tragedy

Premiere
- Date: 31 January 1788
- Place: Theatre Royal, Drury Lane, London

The Fate of Sparta is a 1788 tragedy by the British writer Hannah Cowley. It is also known by the longer title The Fate of Sparta, or, The Rival Kings.

The original Drury Lane cast included John Philip Kemble as Cleombrotus, Robert Bensley as Leonidas, William Barrymore as Amphares, John Whitfield as Nicrates, Matthew Williames as Mezentius, Richard Staunton as Corex, John Phillimore as Sarpedon, Richard Wilson as Priest and Sarah Siddons as Cherolice.

== Bibliography ==
- Nicoll, Allardyce. A History of English Drama 1660–1900: Volume III. Cambridge University Press, 2009.
- Hogan, C.B (ed.) The London Stage, 1660–1800: Volume V. Southern Illinois University Press, 1968.
