= Ann Elliot =

British courtesan and actress (1743–1769)

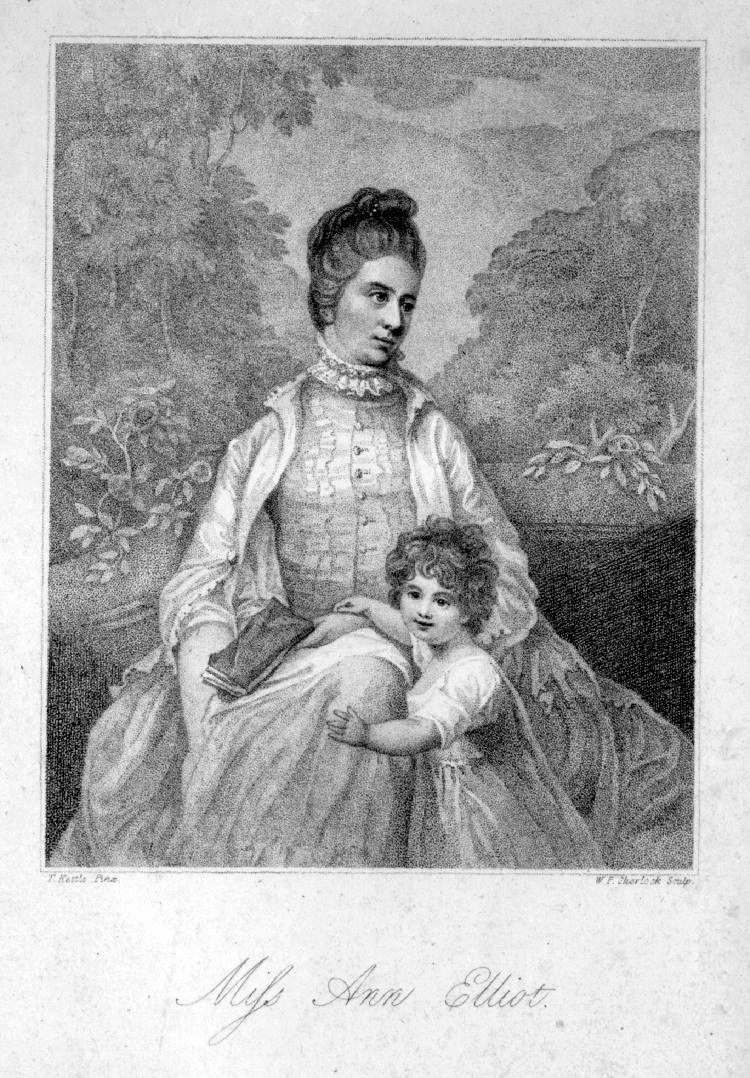
- Born: 16 November 1743; Tonbridge, England
- Died: 30 May 1769 (aged 25); Greek Street, Soho, London, England
- Other name: Miss Hooper
- Occupation: Actor

Ann Elliot (16 November 1743 – 30 May 1769) was a British courtesan and actress. She appeared in comedies in London and Dublin. She had relationships with her mentor Arthur Murphy, with Augustus Hervey, 3rd Earl of Bristol and with Prince Henry, Duke of Cumberland.

== Life ==
Elliot was born in Tonbridge in 1743 to Mary and Richard Elliot. Her father was the sexton of the local church. Elliot became a servant in London, then a high-class courtesan under the name of "Miss Hooper". She became the protégée and mistress of barrister and writer Arthur Murphy.

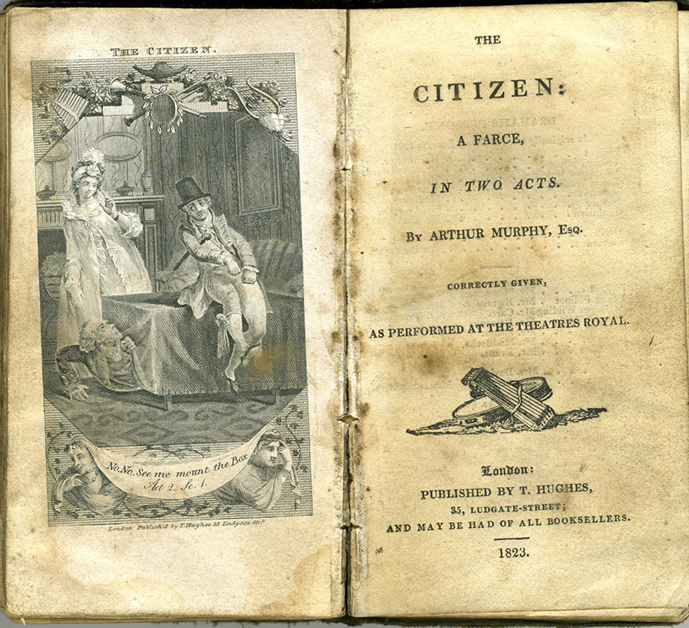
Title page and scene from 1823 printing of The Citizen, produced in 1761

Murphy wrote plays, including The Citizen, a farce, first produced at Drury Lane in 1761, with Elliot in the role of Maria. David Garrick was disparaging about her acting, but he did offer her a contract. However, Garrick did not say that he would pay her, so she went to Spranger Barry's Crow Street Theatre in Dublin for a season. She then returned to work in London, appearing in comedies at Covent Garden for three years. In about 1765, Augustus Hervey, 3rd Earl of Bristol wanted her to leave the stage and become his mistress. Hervey was known as the "English Casanova". Her friendship with Murphy continued. In 1767 she took the role of Mary Ann in his new play The School for Guardians. Murphy was given the profits from two of the six nights it was performed and he gave that money to Elliot.

== Death and legacy ==
Elliot died after a long illness in a house in Greek Street in Soho that had been given to her by the Duke of Cumberland. Cumberland was the King's younger brother and she had been his mistress. She left thousands of pounds to her family including a contribution by the Duke. He arranged for her body to be buried and for a memorial to be created that includes lines attributed to Arthur Murphy.

After her death an anonymous biography appeared of her life noting how Arthur Murphy was devoted to her and how he missed her after her death. After Arthur Murphy's death this relationship was written about by Fanny Burney who found Murphy's devotion to Elliot fascinating.
