= Thomas Lawranson =

Irish painter

Thomas Lawranson (or Lawrenson) (fl. 1760–1777) was an Irish painter.

Lawranson signed the roll of the Incorporated Society of Artists in 1766, and is first styled a fellow of the society in 1774. He lived in Great Russell Street, Bloomsbury, London. A portrait of Lawranson was painted and engraved in mezzotint by his son William Lawranson.

== Works ==
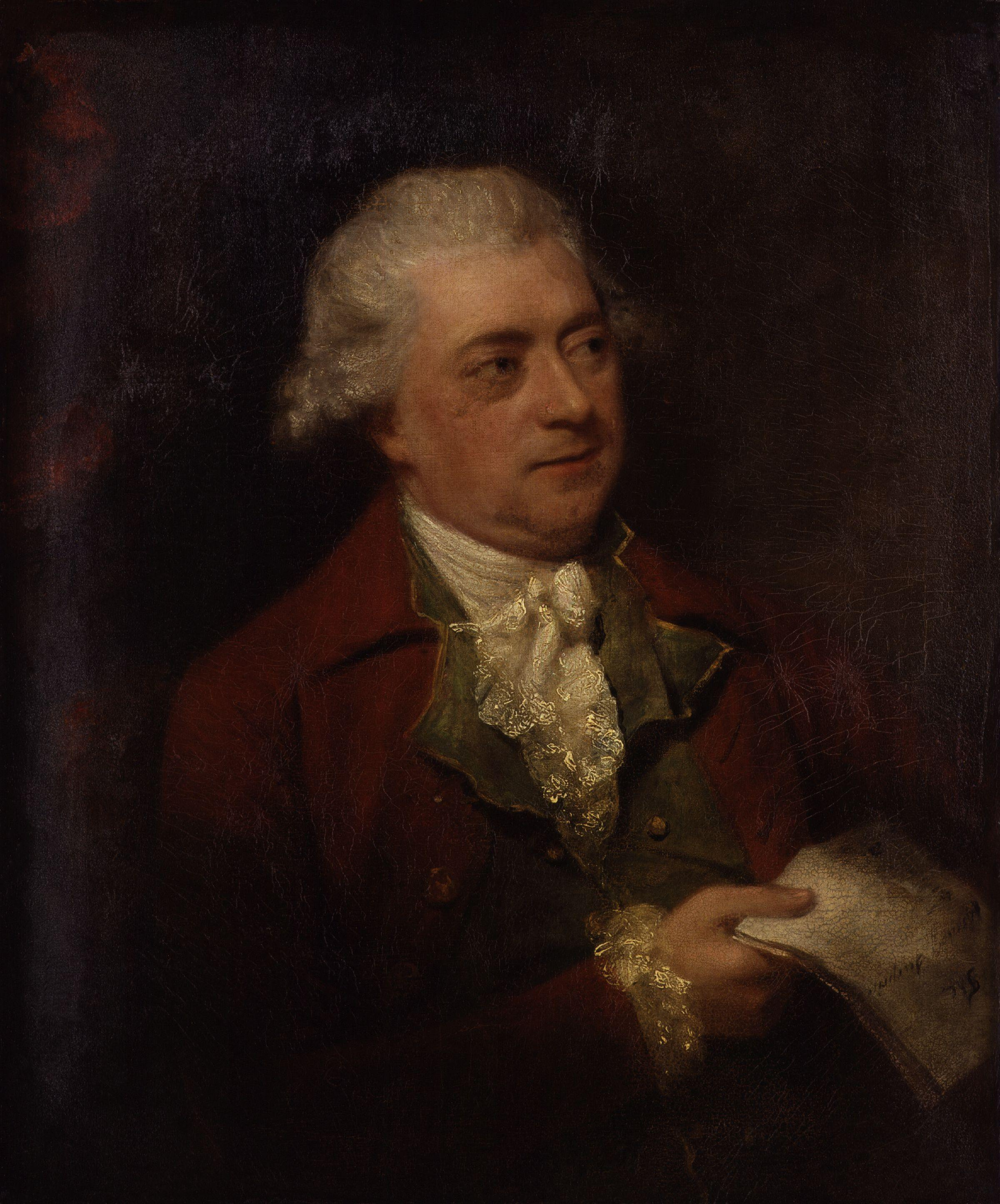
John O'Keeffe, portrait by Thomas or William Lawranson

He appears in 1760 as an exhibitor at the first exhibition of the Society of Artists, sending a portrait of himself; he was subsequently a regular exhibitor until 1777, sending portraits or miniatures. In 1774 he exhibited a portrait which he had executed in 1783. He drew and published a large engraving of Greenwich Hospital.
