= Thomas Hull (actor) =

English actor and dramatist

Thomas Hull (1728–1808) was an English actor and dramatist.

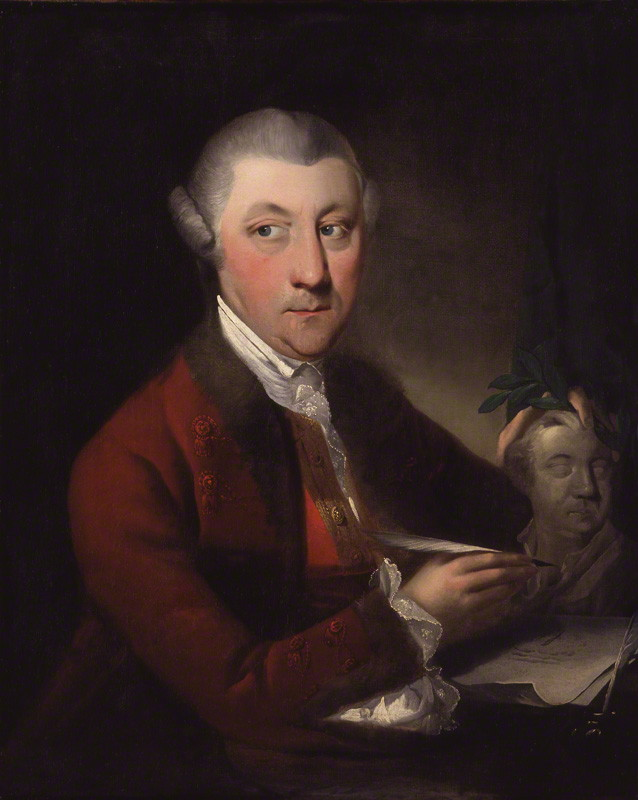
Thomas Hull, portrait from the 1760s

== Early life ==
Born in 1728 in Strand, London, where his father practised as an apothecary, he was educated at Charterhouse School, with a view to a career in the church. He made an unsuccessful attempt to follow his father's profession.

== Stage career ==
According to Biographia Dramatica, Hull first appeared at the Smock Alley Theatre in Dublin; and then moved on to Bath, Somerset, where he managed the theatre for John Palmer. His first recorded appearance was, however, at Covent Garden Theatre, 5 October 1759, as Elder Wou'dbe in George Farquhar's Twin Rivals. At Covent Garden Hull stayed without a break, apparently, till the end of his career, a period of forty-eight years. He was the original Harpagus in John Hoole's Cyrus (3 December 1768), Edwin in William Mason's Elfrida (21 November 1772), Pizarro in Arthur Murphy's Alzuma (23 February 1773), Mador in Mason's Caractacus (6 December 1776), Sir Hubert in Hannah More's Percy (10 December 1777), and Mr. Shandy in Leonard McNally's Tristram Shandy (26 April 1783).

From 1775 to 1782 Hull managed Covent Garden for George Colman. It was his pride that during his long connection with Covent Garden he only missed playing his part once, when he was confined to his bed by a fever. The plays attributed to him, with one or two exceptions which are noted, were acted at Covent Garden.

== Death ==
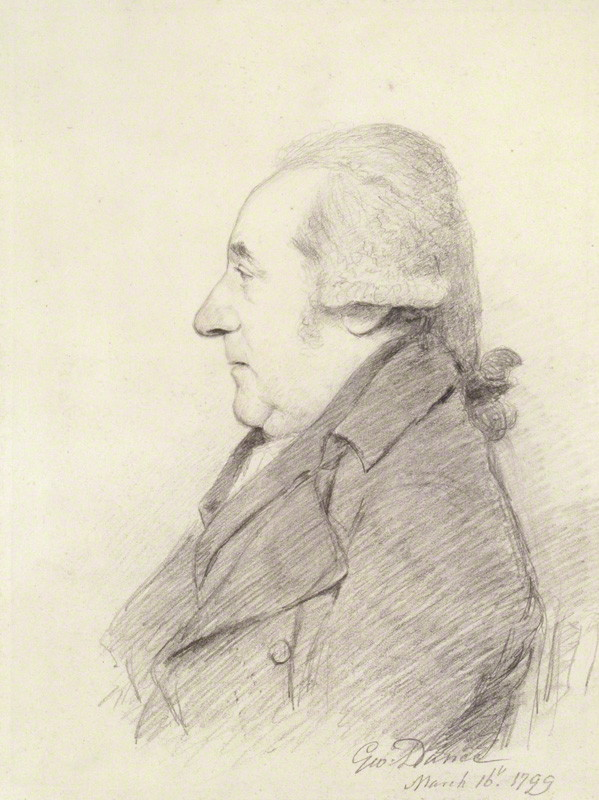
Thomas Hull, 1799 drawing

Hull's name appeared for the last time on the bills on 28 December 1807, when he played the Uncle in George Barnwell. He died on 22 April 1808 at his house, near Dean's Yard, Westminster, and was buried in the churchyard of St Margaret's, Westminster.

His sister, Anna Maria, married John Awsiter. Their daughter, Jane Elizabeth Awister, died in 1837/38, and had expressed the wish to be buried with her uncle, Thomas Hull, in St Margaret's Westminster.

Hull played a role in establishing the Theatrical Fund, taking the initiative over the distresses of Mrs. Hamilton, and calling the actors together. He married Miss Morrison, an actress.

== Works ==
Hull's plays were:

- The Twins, an adaptation of the Comedy of Errors, 24 April 1762; not printed, but once acted, and possibly assigned to Hull in error.
- The Absent Man, a farce, 28 April 1764; not printed.
- Pharnaces, an opera adapted from the Italian, acted at Drury Lane probably in 1765.
- Spanish Lady, musical entertainment, 1765, acted 2 May 1765, and again with alterations 11 December 1769.
- All in the Right, a farce, from the French of Philippe Néricault Destouches, 26 April 1766; not printed.
- The Fairy Favour, 1766, a masque written for the entertainment of the Prince of Wales, acted at Covent Garden about 1767.
- The Perplexities, 1767, 31 January 1767, an adaptation of Samuel Tuke's Adventures of Five Hours, in which Hull played Don Juan.
- The Royal Merchant, 14 December 1767, an opera based on Beaumont and Fletcher's Beggar's Bush.
- The Prodigal Son, an oratorio, 1773, set to music by Dr. Thomas Arnold, and performed at the installation of Lord North as chancellor of the University of Oxford.
- Henry the Second, or the Fall of Rosamond, a tragedy in five acts and in verse, 1774, acted 1 May 1773, with Hull as Clifford, Mrs. Hull as Queen Eleanor, and Mrs. Hartley as Rosamond; it was more than once revived. Four editions of this appeared in 1774; an edition was issued in York in 1775, and the play is included in the collections of Bell and Elizabeth Inchbald.
- Edward and Eleonora, a tragedy, 1775, slightly altered from Thomson, 18 March 1775.
- Love finds the Way, a comic opera, not printed, based on the School for Guardians, 18 November 1777.
- Iphigenia, or the Victim, not printed, 23 March 1778, a tragedy slightly altered from a translation by Boyer of Jean Racine. Hull played Agamemnon.
- The Fatal Interview, a tragedy, not printed, Drury Lane, 16 November 1782. Mrs. Siddons played the heroine, but the piece failed.
- True British Tar, or found at a Pinch, a one-act musical entertainment, played in 1786 at Hull, and not printed.
- Timon of Athens, adapted from Shakespeare and Thomas Shadwell (not printed), 13 May 1786. Hull played Flavius.
- The Comedy of Errors, 1793, 3 June 1793, slightly altered from Shakespeare. Hull was Ægeon.
- Disinterested Love, 30 May 1798, an unprinted alteration from Philip Massinger, in which Hull played Octavio.
- Elisha, or the Woman of Shunem, an oratorio, 1801, presumably not given at Covent Garden. After the custom of the day, just the airs, duets, etc. of the musical pieces were printed.

Hull also wrote:

- The History of Sir William Harrington, a novel, 4 vols. 1771; reprinted 1797; translated into German, Leipzig, 1771, and French, Lausanne, 1773.
- Richard Plantagenet, a Legendary Tale, 1774.
- Select Letters between the late Duchess of Somerset, Lady Luxborough, and others, including a Sketch of the Manners, &c., of the Republic of Venice, 2 vols. London, 1778.
- Moral Tales in Verse, 2 vols., London, 1797.
- A Collection of Poems and Translations in English and Latin, Bath, 1780 (?).

Hull also enjoyed the friendship of William Shenstone, some of whose letters he published. His name also appears on Genuine Letters from a Gentlewoman to a young Lady, her Pupil. Now first revised and published by T. Hull, 1772, 2 vols.

== Notes ==
Attribution

This article incorporates text from a publication now in the public domain: Lee, Sidney, ed. (1891). "Hull, Thomas". Dictionary of National Biography. Vol. 28. London: Smith, Elder & Co.
