= John Hoole =

English translator (1727–1803)

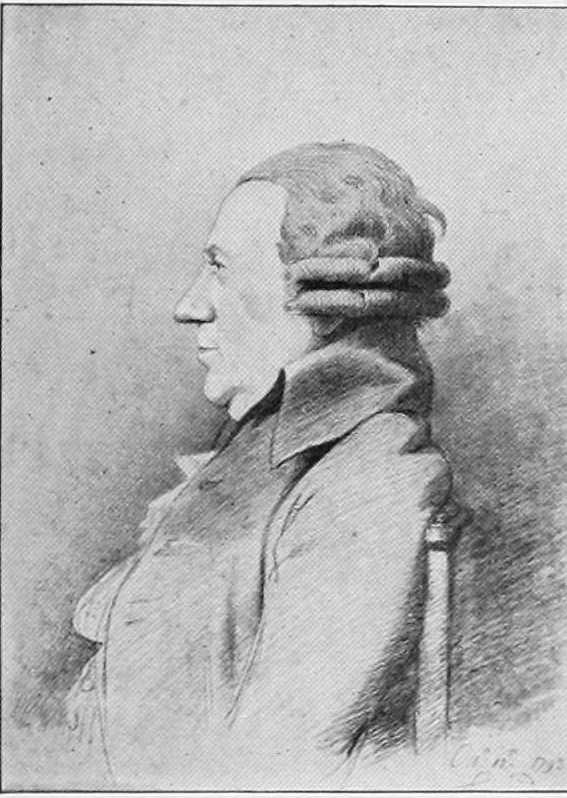
Profile by George Dance

John Hoole (December 1727 – 2 August 1803) was an English translator, the son of Samuel Hoole (born 1692), a mechanic, and Sarah Drury (c. 1700 – c. 1793), the daughter of a Clerkenwell clockmaker. He became a personal friend of Samuel Johnson's.

== Family ==
Hoole was born in Moorfields, London, and was educated at a private school at Hoddesdon, Hertfordshire, kept by a James Bennet. In 1757 he married Susannah Smith (c. 1730 – 1808), a Quaker from Bishop's Stortford. They had a son, Rev. Samuel Hoole, who became a poet and religious writer of some distinction.

== Works ==
At the age of seventeen John Hoole became a clerk in India House (1744–83), of which he rose to be principal auditor of Indian accounts. In connection with his post, he wrote Present State of the English East India Company's Affairs (1772).

Meanwhile he translated Torquato Tasso's Jerusalem Delivered (1763), and Ariosto's Orlando Furioso (1773–83), as well as other works from the Italian. He was also the author of Cleonice, Princess of Bithynia and of two other dramas which failed.

Samuel Johnson was a personal friend of Hoole, who described Johnson's final days in the European Magazine of 1799. Robert Southey recalled that Hoole's Jerusalem Delivered was "the first book he ever possessed," apart from a set of sixpenny children's books. Hoole was a genial character, but termed as a translator not unfairly by Sir Walter Scott as "a noble transmuter of gold into lead".

David Barclay of Youngsbury turned to Hoole to write the biography of his friend John Scott of Amwell, when Johnson, his first choice, died before he could do so.

== Retirement ==
In 1786 Hoole retired to the parsonage of Abinger, Surrey. Afterwards he lived at Tenterden, Kent, and died in Dorking.

== Selected works ==
- Cyrus (1768, play)
- Timanthes (1770, play)
- Cleonice, Princess of Bithynia (1775, play)
