= William "Gentleman" Smith =

English actor

William Smith
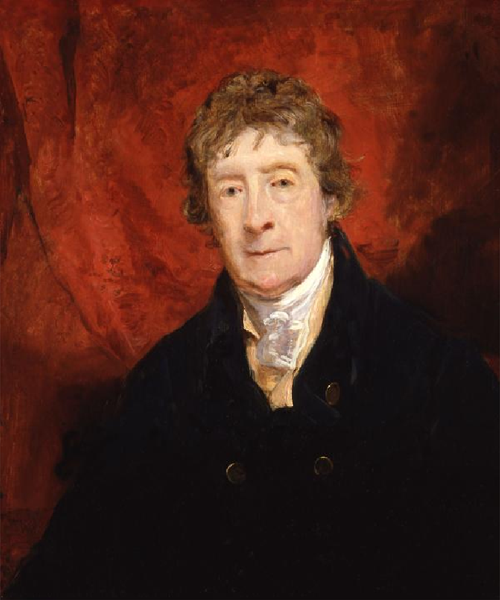
- A portrait of Smith by John Jackson c. 1819, in the National Portrait Gallery in London.
- Born: 1730; London
- Died: 13 September 1819 (aged 88–89); Bury St Edmunds
- Other name: William "Gentleman" Smith
- Occupation: Actor
- Years active: 1753–1758
- Spouse(s): Kelland Courtnay (?Elizabeth Montagu); Miss Newson

William Smith (1730 – 13 September 1819), known as "Gentleman Smith", was a celebrated English actor of the 18th century who worked with David Garrick, and was the original creator of the role of Charles Surface in Richard Brinsley Sheridan's The School for Scandal.

== Biography ==
=== Early life ===
William Smith was born in London in 1730. His father, intending that he should enter the church, sent him to Eton College in 1737 and then to St John's College, Cambridge in 1748. The vivacious spirit for which he was well known at Eton led him into problems at Cambridge. One evening he drank too freely with some friends and, being pursued by a proctor, he unwisely snapped an unloaded pistol at him. He refused the punishment that was imposed, and quit the university to avoid expulsion.

=== Covent Garden 1753–1774 ===
Smith was inclined towards the stage: upon arrival in London, he applied to John Rich at the original Covent Garden Theatre, where he first appeared in January 1753 in the role of Theodosius (in Nathaniel Lee's tragedy of The Force of Love), a performance attended by many of his college friends in a spirit of solidarity. He next appeared as Polydore in Thomas Otway's The Orphan, Southampton in The Earl of Essex, and Dolabella in John Dryden's All for Love. Having taken various subordinate roles in casts led by Mrs. Cibber and Spranger Barry (whose pupil he had effectively become), on Barry's retirement he took on many of that actor's principal parts. If he had defects, they were generally overlooked by his audiences, who admired his upright and independent private life. The poet Charles Churchill, in his "Rosciad" satire of 1761, said of him: "Smith the genteel, the airy, and the smart; Smith was just gone to school to say his part." Smith was at Covent Garden for 22 years.

=== Drury Lane 1774–1788 ===
At the end of season in 1774 he and the actress Elizabeth Hartley, who played his on-stage lover in Henry II or The Fall of Rosamond, caused a scandal when they absconded to France. They travelled on to Cork, Ireland where they acted together. They both returned to London for the autumn season, Hartley to continue at Covent Garden and Smith to Drury Lane. Garrick having engaged him for Drury Lane, he remained there until retirement in 1788. Though for a long time he played lead roles in tragedy, for which he had a suitably tall and well-proportioned figure, his facial features lacked the flexibility and expressiveness, and his vocal delivery was somewhat too harsh and monotonous, to be considered ideal. However, he won popularity as Richard III, Hotspur, and Hastings, and was also admired in the roles of Kitely (Every Man in his Humour, in which he was preferred to Garrick), Archer, and Oakly. It was said that he prided himself on the reflection that he was never called upon to perform in an after-piece, or to pass through a trapdoor in any entrance or exit on the stage.

=== Charles Surface ===
Smith's masterpiece was his impersonation of Charles Surface in Richard Brinsley Sheridan's The School for Scandal, which won the highest praise for originality, boldness of conception, truth, freedom, ease, and gracefulness of action and manner. He is mentioned favourably in Charles Lamb's Essays of Elia:

"...it was then the fashion to cry down John Kemble, who took the part after Smith; but, I thought, very unjustly. Smith, I fancy, was more airy, and took the eye with a certain gaiety of person. He brought with him no sombre recollections of tragedy. He had not to expiate the fault of having pleased beforehand in lofty declamation. He had no sins of Hamlet or of Richard to atone for. His failure in these parts was a passport to success in one of so opposite a tendency."

On 9 March 1788, after a performance of Hamlet, Smith announced his intention to retire and "resign the sprightly Charles to abler hands and younger heads". After a performance of the role on 9 June 1788, he gave his farewell speech, though he did appear once more in 1798 in a benefit performance for his friend Thomas King, when, 'having grown very lusty, he went through the character with that spirit, ease, and elegance, for which he was unequalled.'

== Personal life and retirement ==
In his early days, Smith was often distracted from his professional work by his love of fox-hunting. He first married the sister of John Montagu, 4th Earl of Sandwich, Mrs Kelland Courtnay (a widow), who died in 1762. His elopement to Ireland with Elizabeth Hartley followed. In later life he was remarried, to Miss Newson of Leiston in Suffolk. (Through the second marriage in the Newson family is traced a relationship to Hamlet Watling, whose brother Edwin also married a daughter of Smith's). Smith died at Bury St Edmunds on 13 September 1819 in his 89th year. There his elegant figure was remembered as always wearing a white hat edged with green, a blue coat, figured waistcoat, fustian coloured breeches, and gaiters to match, and carrying a gold-headed cane. He was loved by the youngsters of Bury whom he often obliged with sweets from the candy-shop.

== Sources ==
- Encyclopœdia Britannica 1911.
- Knight, John Joseph (1898). "Smith, William (1730?-1819)". In Lee, Sidney (ed.). Dictionary of National Biography. Vol. 53. London: Smith, Elder & Co.
