= Arthur Murphy (writer) =

Irish writer

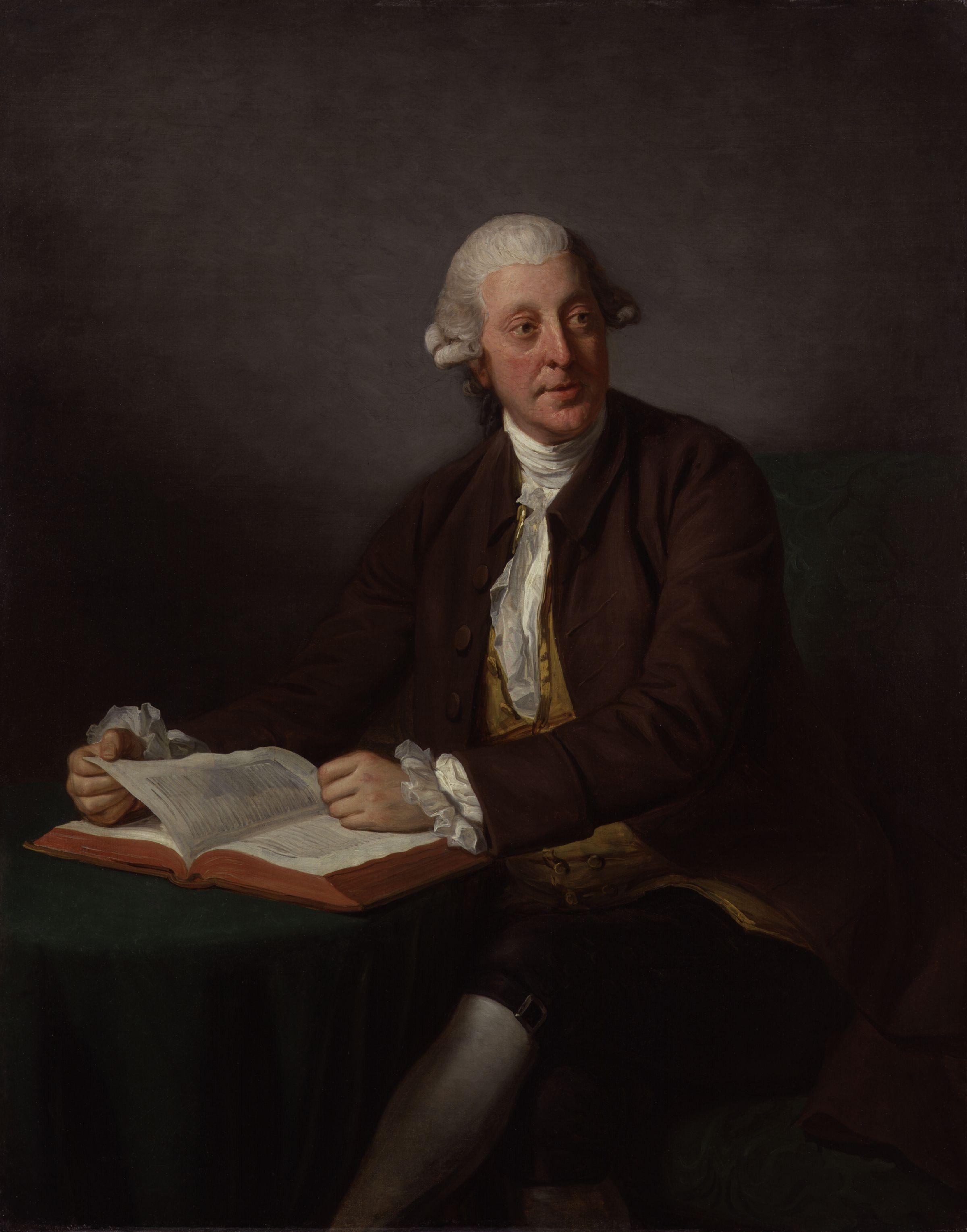
- Portrait of Arthur Murphy by Nathaniel Dance, 1777
- Born: 27 December 1727; County Roscommon, Ireland
- Died: 18 June 1805; Knightsbridge, England
- Spouse: Ann Elliot

Arthur Murphy (27 December 1727 – 18 June 1805), also known by the pseudonym Charles Ranger, was an Irish writer and barrister. He established himself in London as a leading playwright.

== Biography ==
Murphy was born at Cloonyquin, County Roscommon, Ireland, the son of Richard Murphy and Jane French.

He studied at the Jesuit-run College of Saint-Omer, France, and was a gifted student of the Latin and Greek classics.

He worked as an actor in the theatre, became a barrister, a journalist and finally a playwright. He edited Gray's Inn Journal between 1752 and 1754. As Henry Thrale's oldest and dearest friend, he introduced Samuel Johnson to the Thrales in January 1765. No. 16 Hammersmith Terrace was built for him in 1775. He was appointed Commissioner of Bankruptcy in 1803. But his own debts caught up with him and he was forced to sell the house and part of his library. He died on 18 June 1805 at his new home, 14 Queen's Row, Knightsbridge and was buried in Hammersmith.

Murphy is known for his translations of Tacitus in 1793. They were reprinted in the Family Classical Library (A. J. Valpy, 1830-1834) and were still published in 1922. He also wrote three biographies: his 1792 An Essay on the Life and Genius of Samuel Johnson, his 1762 Fielding's Works and his 1801 Life of David Garrick.

Murphy is thought to have coined the legal term "wilful misconstruction" whilst representing the Donaldson v. Becket appeal to the House of Lords in 1774 against the perpetual possession of copyright.

Arthur Murphy was devoted to Ann Elliot and he missed her after her early death. After Arthur Murphy's death this relationship was written about by Fanny Burney who found Murphy's devotion to Elliot fascinating.

A biography was written in 1811 by Dr. Jesse Foot. Nathaniel Dance painted his portrait which is thought to now be in the Irish National Portrait Collection.

His elder brother was known as James Murphy French, using his mother's surname. He lived in London with his brother.

== Murphy's drama ==
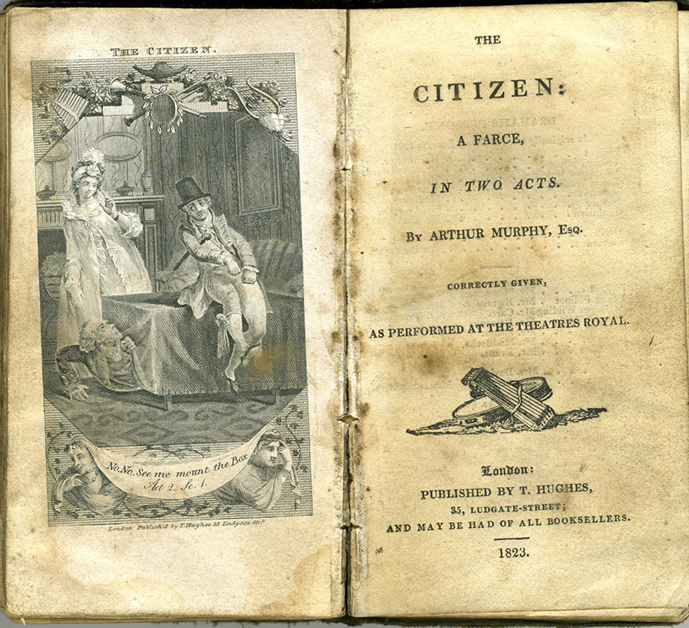
Title page and scene from 1823 printing of The Citizen, produced in 1761

An example of Murphy's theatrical writings is The Citizen, a farce, first produced at Drury Lane in 1761. The play included Ann Elliot as Maria. Ann was Murphy's protege and mistress.

Philpot, a wealthy skinflint, has bargained with Sir Jasper Wilding, a fox hunter, for his son Young Philpot, a buck and wastrel, to marry Maria Wilding, and for his daughter Sally to marry Wilding's son, for settlements and twenty thousand pounds paid to Sir Jasper. Young Philpot has lost a fortune, but borrows money from his father and embarks on an insurance fraud involving shipwrecked goods. Maria plans to marry Beaufort, who loves her. As Young Philpot tries to propose, she convinces him she is half-witted, and he spurns her. In the second act, Philpot senior is visiting Corinna, a lady of loose virtue, but hides under the table when his son calls upon her. He overhears as Young Philpot tells her how he has cajoled the money out of his father. Maria's brother surprises them, and old Philpot is also discovered, to their mutual shame. In the final scene Sir Jasper with a lawyer obtains Philpot's signature to the agreements, but meanwhile Maria, an educated girl, shows her strong character to Young Philpot and he again refuses to propose. Having signed away his rights old Philpot offers to marry her, but the lawyer reveals himself as Beaufort, and explains that he has swapped the deeds, so that Philpot has unwittingly signed his agreement for Maria to marry Beaufort.

== Works ==
=== Dramas ===
All dates refer to the play's first production, except where otherwise stated.

- The Apprentice (1756)
- The Upholsterer (1758)
- The Orphan of China (1759), tragedy (an adaption of L'Orphelin de la Chine (1755) by Voltaire and its source, a translation of The Orphan of Zhao)
- The Way to Keep Him (1760), comedy
- The Desert Island (1760), dramatic poem
- The Citizen (1761)
- All in the Wrong (1761), comedy
- The Old Maid (1761)
- No One's Enemy But His Own (1764)
- Three Weeks After Marriage (1764)
- The Choice (1764)
- The School for Guardians (1767)
- Zenobia (1768), tragedy
- The Grecian Daughter (1772), tragedy
- Alzuma (1773), tragedy
- News from Parnassus, A Prelude (1776)
- Know Your Own Mind (1777), comedy
- The Rival Sisters (written 1783, performed 1793), tragedy

=== Biographies ===
- Fielding's Works (1762)
- An Essay on the Life and Genius of Samuel Johnson (1792)
- Life of David Garrick (1801)

== Sources ==
- Emery, John Pike. 1946. Arthur Murphy: An Eminent English Dramatist of the Eighteenth Century. University of Pennsylvania Press. ASIN B0006AQYEA.
- Murphy, Arthur. 1786. The Works of Arthur Murphy, Esq. in Seven Volumes. London: Cadell. (Volume One is available to download on Google books.)
- Spector, Robert Donald. 1979. Arthur Murphy. Twain. ISBN 0-8057-6751-7.
