= Ralph Wewitzer =

English actor

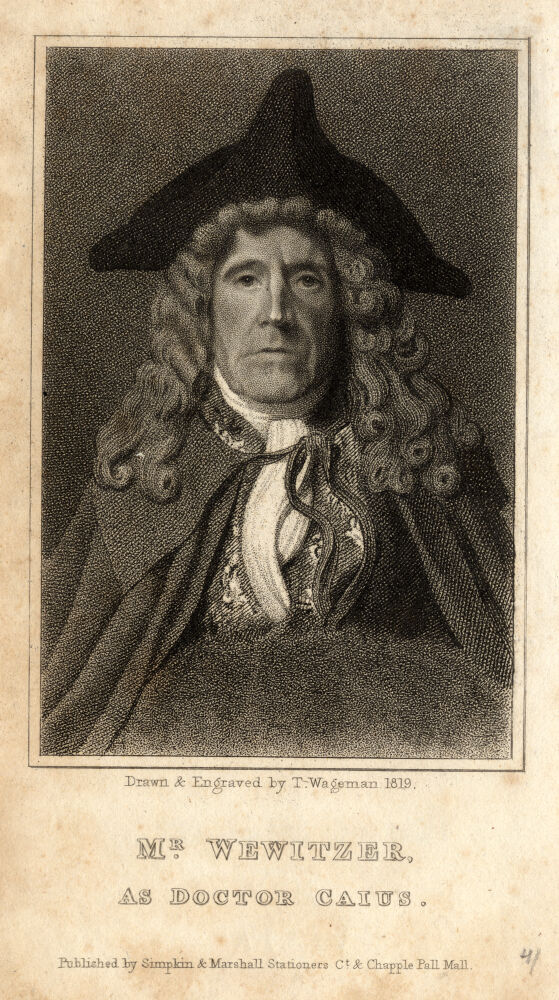
- Portrait of Ralph Wewitzer in character, as Dr. Caius in The Merry Wives of Windsor
- Born: 1748
- Died: 1825 (aged 76–77)
- Occupation: actor

Ralph Wewitzer (1748–1825) was an English actor. He won critical acclaim in supporting parts, but was never given leading roles. He had a 44-year acting career, and is thought to have learned over 400 speaking parts.

== Early roles at Covent Garden ==
He was born on 17 December 1748 in Salisbury Street, Strand, London, to Peter and Ann Wewitzer; his parents were involved in the theatre, and his father was Swiss or Norwegian. He is identified by Gerald Reitlinger and Kalman Burnim as Jewish by background.

Wewitzer was once apprenticed to a jeweller. He made his first appearance at Covent Garden Theatre in May 1773 as Ralph in The Maid in the Mill, it is said for the benefit of his sister Sarah Wewitzer. On 21 November 1775 he was the original Lopez, a Spanish manservant in The Duenna by Richard Brinsley Sheridan. For 14 years he remained at Covent Garden.

It was said that in the early days Wewitzer, in debt, went to Dublin, where he acted under Thomas Ryder. Among his parts at Covent Garden were Filch in The Beggar's Opera, Champignon in The Reprisal by Tobias Smollett, Jerry Sneak in The Mayor of Garratt by Samuel Foote, Simon Pure in A Bold Stroke for a Wife by Susanna Centlivre, Dr. Pinch in The Comedy of Errors, Coromandel (an original part) in Frederick Pilon's Liverpool Prize, 22 February 1779, and Dr. Caius in The Merry Wives of Windsor.

Wewitzer had many parts, mainly as servants or similar, in minor comedies of Thomas Holcroft, John O'Keeffe, Pilon, and others. In Omar, or a Trip round the World, by O'Keeffe, with music by William Shield, produced at Covent Garden on 20 December 1785, Wewitzer delivered an effective harangue in what purported to be the language of a Polynesian chief.

== Haymarket Theatre, Drury Lane company and the management of the Royalty Theatre ==
On 8 July 1780 Wewitzer appeared at the Haymarket Theatre as Fripon in Miles Peter Andrews's comic opera Fire and Water, then first produced. At the same house, at which he appeared during many consecutive summers, he was Diana Trapes on 8 August 1781, when The Beggar's Opera was played en travesti. In 1785 John Palmer built the Royalty Theatre in Wellclose Square, opened in 1787. On his failure and imprisonment in 1789 he gave the management to Wewitzer, who severed his connection with Covent Garden and sought to make the Royalty a popular house, on the lines Sadler's Wells. It ended in a collapse, costing him money and reputation.

In August 1790 Wewitzer was at the Haymarket Theatre, where he was seen for two or three summers; and in September 1791 he was with the Drury Lane company at the King's Theatre in Haymarket. Here he was on 20 April 1792 the first Larron, a smuggler, in The Fugitive, altered by Francis Richardson from The Coxcomb of Beaumont and Fletcher. At Drury Lane he played Gripe in The Cheats of Scapin by Thomas Otway, and Moses in Sheridan's The School for Scandal.

== Later life ==
After the Drury Lane Theatre fire of 1809, Ralph Wewitzer went with the company to the Lyceum Theatre. There he was on 30 September 1811 the first La Fosse in Thomas Moore's M.P., or the Blue Stocking. On the reopening night of Drury Lane (10 October 1812) he was one of the gravediggers in Hamlet. Soon after this time his name disappeared from theatre bills.

Wewitzer played a part in arranging the marriage in 1815 of the actress Harriot Mellon to Thomas Coutts, who died in 1822 at age 86; and he was for a short time a member of her household. An account in Mrs. Cornwell Baron Wilson's memoirs of Harriot suggests that Wewitzer was either a family friend, or knew her from the time when she joined the Drury Lane Theatre, which was 1794–5. He acted as an adviser.

Harriot Coutts after 1822 was left with Thomas's large fortune and bank partnership, but also with the hostility of Coutts's family from his first marriage. She was mercilessly lampooned. A pamphlet Mr. Percy Wyndham's Strictures on an Impostor was written in alignment with Wewitzer's financial interests, and taxed her with falsehood and ingratitude. Ernest Hartley Coleridge, biographer of Coutts, commented that it proclaimed "the wrongs and sufferings of the decayed actor, Ralph Wewitzer", and declared it "probable that Wewitzer, who was old and poor, had been interviewed and had complained of ingratitude and neglect, but it is evident that he had not unfolded the tale in which he figures as hero or villain."

In his later years, Wewitzer drew a pension from the Covent Garden fund. He died in poverty at lodgings in Wild Passage, Drury Lane, on 1 January 1825. His body was removed by his landlady, to whom he was in debt, from an expensive coffin supplied by his sister.

== Acting style ==
Wewitzer gradually acquired a reputation in low comedy character parts, especially foreigners. At the time, the representation of ethnicity or foreign accent tended to be left to the actor, not being specified or written in dialect by the playwright. Comedic Jewish roles were a new development in the later 18th century.

Besides Wewitzer, Robert Baddeley and John Quick had standing as "Jewish impersonators". The convention was of a "Jewish cant", based largely on Dutch-accented broken English with modified consonants. Wewitzer played accented Jewish roles. On the other hand, Anthony (John Williams) wrote of Wewitzer suggesting his acting range was limited, but his performances masterly:

Yet his Caius and clowns we may see and admire,
And his Bellair, like glass, is engendered by fire.
Frenchmen are free from unpleasant grimace,
And his Jews you would swear were all born in Duke's Place.

The last line may reference the central Dukes Place synagogue in the City of London.

== Works ==
Wewitzer wrote for the Haymarket Theatre The Gnome a pantomime acted in 1788 (not printed); and for the Covent Garden Theatre The Magic Cavern, a pantomime played 27 December 1784, published 1785. He also published:

- Pedigree of King George III, lineally deduced from King Egbert 1812
- A jest book, School for Wits, a Choice Collection of Bons Mots, Anecdotes, and other Poetical Jeux d'Esprit, 1815
- Dramatic Reminiscences, by Ralph Wewitzer, Comedian
- Theatrical Pocket-book, or brief Dramatic Chronology, 1814
- A brief Dramatic Chronology of Actors, &c., to which is added a Miscellaneous Appendix, 1817.

== Family ==
Wewitzer married, firstly, in Liverpool in 1776, Mary Daniels (they had one daughter), and secondly a Miss Brangin, in 1787.

== Selected roles ==
- Lopez in The Duenna by Richard Brinsley Sheridan (1777)
- Charles in Know Your Own Mind by Arthur Murphy (1777)
- French servant in The Belle's Stratagem by Hannah Cowley (1780)
- Vandervelt in Duplicity by Thomas Holcroft (1781)
- Von Irkin in The World as it Goes by Hannah Cowley (1781)
- Le Gout in More Ways Than One by Hannah Cowley (1783)
- Squad in The Campaign by Robert Jephson (1785)
- Colonel Staff in Fashionable Levities by Leonard MacNally (1785)
- Count Pierpont in He Would Be a Soldier by Frederick Pilon (1786)
- Lord Bonton in The Ton by Eglantine Wallace (1788)
- Count Fripon in The Prisoner at Large by John O'Keeffe (1788)
- Pavot in The Toy by John O'Keeffe (1789)
- Corporal Smack in Cross Partners by Elizabeth Inchbald (1792)
- Barebones in The London Hermit by John O'Keeffe (1793)
- Tony in False Colours by Edward Morris (1793)
- Herbert in The Man of Ten Thousand by Thomas Holcroft (1796)
- Squire Abel in The Last of the Family by Richard Cumberland (1797)
- Mr Taunton in Knave or Not?by Thomas Holcroft (1798)
- Pedro in Aurelio and Miranda by James Boaden (1798)
- Friponeau in The East Indian by Matthew Lewis (1799)
- Lounge in Indiscretion by Prince Hoare (1800)
- Lapierre in Fashionable Friends by Mary Berry (1802)
- Bailiff in Hear Both Sidesby Thomas Holcroft (1803)
- Peter in The Land We Live In by Francis Ludlow Holt (1804)
- Abrahams in The Vindictive Manby Thomas Holcroft (1806)
