= William Barrymore (stage actor) =

British actor (c. 1759–1830)

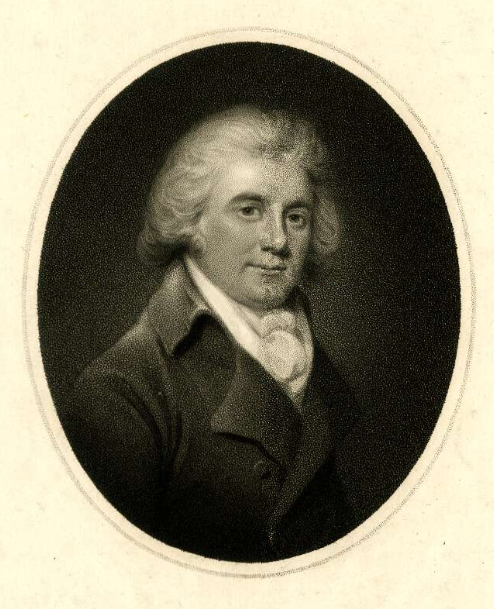
- Born: 1759
- Died: 1830 (aged 70–71)
- Occupation: Stage actor

William Barrymore (c. 1759–1830) was a British stage actor. Originally from Taunton, he was part of a company of strolling players in the West Country, and was acting at Plymouth in 1780. He first appeared at the Theatre Royal, Drury Lane in 1782, under the management of Richard Sheridan, and became a long-standing member of the company. He is also the namesake of the famed Barrymore family.

== Selected roles ==
- Lord Aimworth in The Maid of the Mill by Isaac Bickerstaffe (1782)
- Osric in Hamlet by William Shakespeare (1783)
- Freeman in The Metamorphosis by William Jackson (1783)
- Connal in The Captives by John Delap (1786)
- Amphares in The Fate of Sparta by Hannah Cowley (1788)
- Alonzo in Marcella by William Hayley (1789)
- Lord Herries in Mary, Queen of Scots by John St John (1789)
- Gondibert in The Battle of Hexham by George Colman the Younger (1789)
- Sir Charles Freemantle in The Impostors by Richard Cumberland (1789)
- Captain Montague in False Colours by Edward Morris (1793)
- Lord Rakeland in The Wedding Day by Elizabeth Inchbald (1794)
- Captain Waterland in The Box-Lobby Challenge by Richard Cumberland (1794)
- Mr Fashion in The Welch Heiress by Edward Jerningham (1795)
- Zorinski in Zorinski by Thomas Morton (1795)
- Cedric in Edwy and Elgiva by Fanny Burney (1795)
- Rawbold in The Iron Chest by George Colman the Younger (1796)
- Sir Pertinax Pitiful in The Man of Ten Thousand by Thomas Holcroft (1796)
- Annius in The Conspiracy by Robert Jephson (1796)
- Aurelius in Vortigern and Rowena by William Henry Ireland (1796)
- Osmond in The Castle Spectre by Matthew Lewis (1797)
- Raymond in Aurelio and Miranda by James Boaden (1798)
- Oliver in Knave or Not? by Thomas Holcroft (1798)
- Llewellyn in Cambro-Britons by James Boaden (1798)
- Clifton in A Word for Nature by Richard Cumberland (1798)
- Francisco in The Inquisitor by Thomas Holcroft (1798)
- Modish in The East Indian by Matthew Lewis (1799)
- Lapont in The Castle of Montval by Thomas Sedgwick Whalley (1799)
- Mr Dorville in The Secret by Edward Morris (1799)
- Pizarro in Pizarro by Richard Brinsley Sheridan (1799)
- Count Freberg in De Monfort by Joanna Baillie (1800)
- Prince John in Adelaide by Henry James Pye (1800)
- Don Gusman in Antonio by William Godwin (1800)
- Clermont in Indiscretion by Prince Hoare (1800)
- Father Cyprion in Adelmorn, the Outlaw by Matthew Lewis (1801)
- Confesser in Julian and Agnes by William Sotheby (1801)
- Alphonso in The Voice of Nature by James Boaden (1802)
- Lovell in Fashionable Friends by Mary Berry (1802)
- Sir Harry Lovelace in The Land We Live In by Francis Ludlow Holt (1804)
- Sir Edward Epworth in The School for Friends by Marianne Chambers (1805)
- Colonel Raymond in A Prior Claim by Henry James Pye (1805)
- Colonel Anson in The Vindictive Man by Thomas Holcroft (1806)
- Hugh de Tracy in The Curfew by John Tobin (1807)
- William Clayton h in The Gazette Extraordinary by Joseph George Holman (1811)
- Damper in Education by Thomas Morton (1813)

== Bibliography ==
- Highfill, Philip H, Burnim, Kalman A. & Langhans, Edward A. A Biographical Dictionary of Actors, Actresses, Musicians, Dancers, Managers, and Other Stage Personnel in London, 1660-1800: Abaco to Belfille. SIU Press, 1973.
