= Charlotte Tidswell =

English actress

- Born: c. 1760
- Died: 3 September 1846; Chelsea
- Occupation: actor
- Known for: caring for Edmund Kean

Charlotte Tidswell (c. 1760 – 3 September 1846) was an English actress.

== Life ==
Tidswell was born in 1759 or 1760 and her father may have been a soldier. She may have been acting for five years when her name was first mentioned when she appeared with the company creating "The Busy Body" at Drury Lane. This would end up being her main theatre. She had been the mistress of Charles Howard who was a Duke of Norfolk and it was conjectured that this was the reason she started at Drury Lane.

In 1787 Edmund Kean was born. The identity of his mother is unknown and many suspected that Tidswell, who was known to him as "Aunt Tid", was his mother. She certainly mothered him and took an interest in him as he developed into an acting prodigy and she steered his career. His father figure was Moses Kean who was a solo performer, but it is not certain who Edmund's father was. One source says that it was Moses's younger brother. Moses died in 1792.

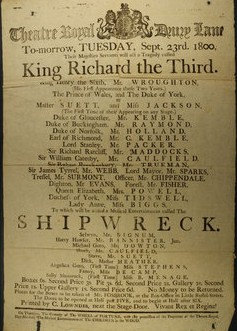
Richard III, 23 September 1800, with Miss Tidwell as the Duchess of York

Tidswell would act during the winter at Drury Lane but she never took a leading role. She changed address frequently and that is thought to have been due to finances. She was earning about three pounds a weeks although in time she would get an annual benefit performance and during the summer she would take other acting roles. In the summer she was usually in Liverpool, but sometimes in Brighton. In the winter she might play a named Shakespearean role like the Duchess of York in Richard III or Lady Capulet in Romeo and Juliet. It was noted at the time that although she never played a leading part she attracted a large amount of attention from the critics. She played courtesans and women of poor character but she was applauded for not confusing her character's shortcomings with her own private life.

She was a respectable actor when she decided to retire on 21 May 1822. As was the custom, there was a benefit performance for her and Edmund Kean was there to oversee proceedings and convey her thanks to those present. She returned Kean's kindness and as he went into old age she would care for him at his home in Richmond. He died in 1833.

Tidswell died at her home in Chelsea in 1846.

== Selected roles ==
- Penelope in The Natural Son by Richard Cumberland (1784)
- Tiffany in The Heiress by John Burgoyne (1786)
- Virgin in The Captives by John Delap (1786)
- Nerina in Julia by Robert Jephson (1787)
- Mrs Pinup in Seduction by Thomas Holcroft (1787)
- Lady Scrope in Mary, Queen of Scots by John St John (1789)
- Lady Autumn in The Wedding Day by Elizabeth Inchbald (1794)
- Dorcas in The Jew by Richard Cumberland (1794)
- Maid in The Wheel of Fortune by Richard Cumberland (1795)
- Mrs Kate in First Love by Richard Cumberland (1795)
- Lucy in The Last of the Family by Richard Cumberland (1795)
- Attendant in Vortigern and Rowena by William Henry Ireland (1796)
- Dame Rawbold in The Iron Chest by George Colman the Younger (1796)
- Deborah in The Will by Frederick Reynolds (1797)
- St. Agatha in Aurelio and Miranda by James Boaden (1798)
- Mrs. Blaball in The East Indian by Matthew Lewis (1799)
- Lapett in Fashionable Friends by Mary Berry (1802)
- Susan in The Land We Live In by Francis Ludlow Holt (1804)
- Sarah in The School for Friends by Marianne Chambers (1805)
- Margaret in The Siege of St Quintin by Theodore Hook (1808)
- Bettina in Rugantino by Matthew Lewis (1820)
