= Sarah Harlowe =

British actress (1765–1852)

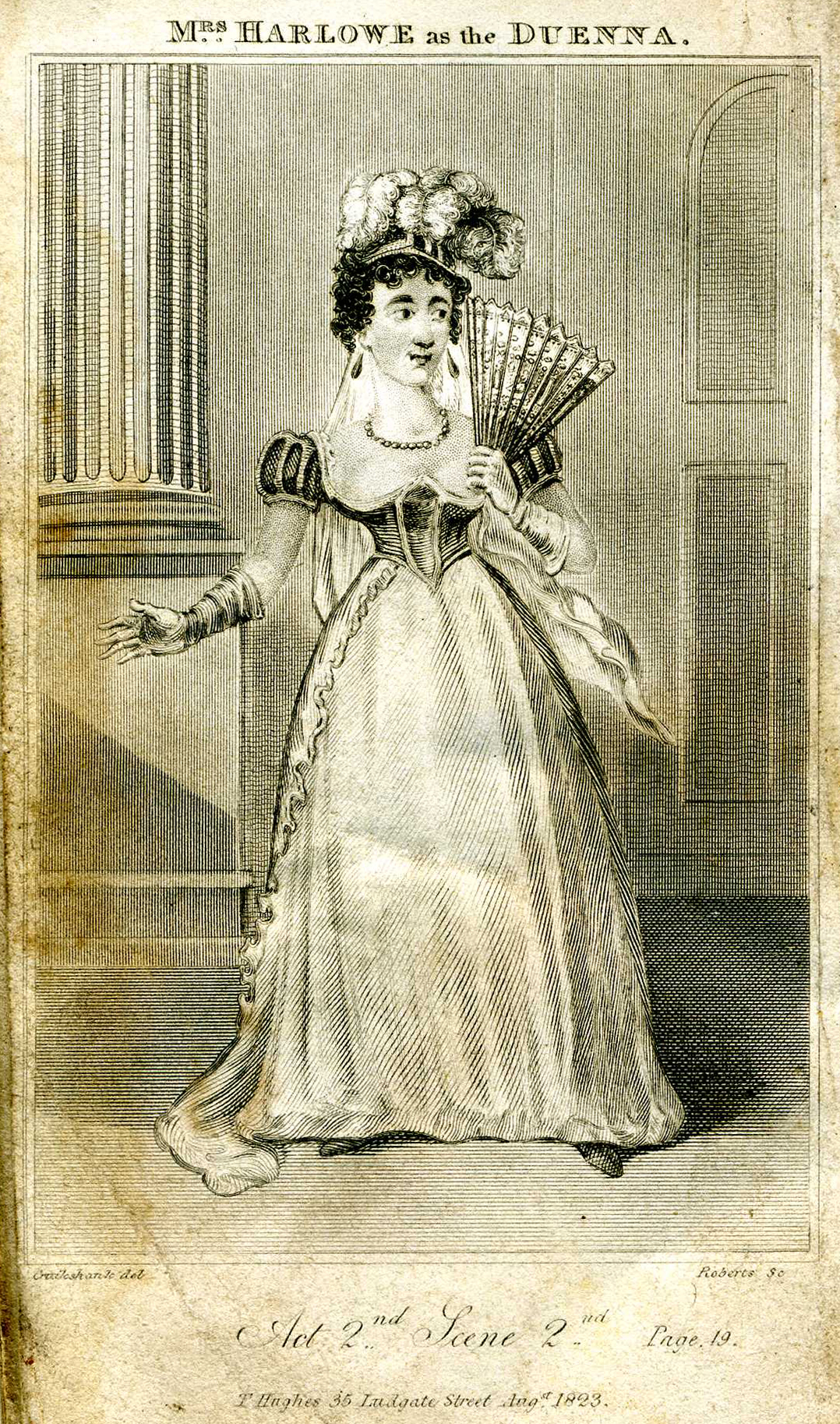
Mrs. Harlowe in the role of The Duenna in Richard Brinsley Sheridan's opera of that name, a drawing by George Cruikshank published in 1823.

Sarah Harlowe (c. 1765–1852) was a popular actress of the London stage around the turn of the 19th century.

== Biography ==
Harlowe was born in London in about 1765. Under the name of Mrs.Harlowe, she made her first appearance on the stage at Colnbrook, near Slough, in 1787, removing in the following year to Windsor, where she met Francis Godolphin Waldron (1743–1818) and became his wife.

=== Stage life ===
Waldron was prompter of the Haymarket Theatre, London, manager of the Windsor and Richmond theatres, a bookseller, an occasional actor at the Haymarket and Drury Lane, manager of the Drury Lane Theatrical Fund, the writer of several comedies, and a Shakespearean scholar. Through her husband's interest, Mrs. Harlowe got an engagement at Sadler's Wells, where she gained some celebrity as a singer, actor, and performer in pantomimes.

She appeared at Covent Garden on 4 November 1790 in the Fugitive. She was the original singer of Down in the country and lived a lass. The song was generally introduced to Lady Bell. In 1792, she was at the Haymarket, whence she went to Drury Lane, where she sustained the characters of smart chambermaids, romps, shrews, and old women, and then removed to the English Opera House. At the opening of the Royalty Theatre, Wellclose Square, under the direction of William Macready, the elder, on 27 November 1797, Mrs. Harlowe played in the musical sketch entitled Amurath the Fourth, or the Turkish Harem, and also in the pantomime, the Festival of Hope, or Harlequin in a Bottle. In 1816, she played Lady Sneerwell at Drury Lane. Her husband died in March 1818, in his seventy-fifth year.

She was a low comedy actress who, without any splendid talent, had such a complete knowledge of stage requirements that her services were most useful in any theatre. Her figure was neat, and she often assumed male characters. Her best parts were Lucy in the Rivals, the Widow Warren in the Road to Ruin, Miss Mac-Tab in The Poor Gentleman, and the old Lady Lambert in the Hypocrite. However, she essayed most of Mrs. Jordan's characters and successfully played them.

In 1826, she retired from the stage, having on 21 February in that year played Mrs. Foresight in the farce of John Bull at Drury Lane. She was one of the original subscribers to the Drury Lane Theatrical Fund, from which, in 1827, she received an annuity of £140 per annum, which, in 1837, was reduced to £112.

=== Death ===
She died suddenly of heart disease at her lodgings, 5 Albert Place, Gravesend, Kent, on 2 January 1852, aged 86, and her death was registered at Somerset House as that of "Sarah Waldron, annuitant".

== Selected roles ==
- Jenny in The Road to Ruin by Thomas Holcroft (1792)
- Diana Grampus in The Box-Lobby Challenge by Richard Cumberland (1794)
- Mariguita in Don Pedro by Richard Cumberland (1796)
- Licia in The Inquisitor by Thomas Holcroft (1798)
- Trimming in Fashionable Friends by Mary Berry (1802)
- Fanny in Hearts of Oak by John Till Allingham (1803)
- Harriet in The Vindictive Man by Thomas Holcroft (1806)
- Mrs O'Shanauhan in Ourselves by Marianne Chambers (1811)
- Lady Nightshade in The Faro Table by John Tobin (1816)
- Marian in The Innkeeper's Daughter by George Soane (1817)
- Mrs Fairweather in The Touchstone by James Kenney (1817)
