= The Force of Ridicule =

Play by Thomas Holcroft

- Original language: English
- Written by: Thomas Holcroft
- Genre: Comedy

Premiere
- Date: 6 December 1796
- Place: Theatre Royal, Drury Lane, London

The Force of Ridicule is a 1796 comedy play by the British writer Thomas Holcroft.

The original Drury Lane cast included John Palmer, William Barrymore, Richard Suett, Robert Palmer, Charles Kemble, John Bannister, Maria Theresa Kemble and Elizabeth Farren.

According to James Boaden, the play was "perdurably damned” after its opening night and never performed again. The manuscript of the play was never published and its sources were only hinted at in Biographica Dramatica, where it was mentioned that it was believed to have been derived from French. The failure of the play was seen as so great, Holcroft did not attempt any further playwriting for another two years.

== Bibliography ==
- Nicoll, Allardyce. A History of English Drama 1660–1900: Volume III. Cambridge University Press, 2009.
- Hogan, C.B (ed.) The London Stage, 1660–1800: Volume V. Southern Illinois University Press, 1968.
