= Sarah Maria Wilson =

Sarah Maria Wilson (died 1786) was an English actress.

== Early life ==
Her maiden name was Adcock. She acted in York, where, as Mrs. Weston, in the summer of 1773 she played Lucy Lockit in the Beggar's Opera, Miss Notable in the 'Lady's Last Stake,' and other comic parts.

== The London stage ==
After appearing in Leeds, where she became a favourite, and in Glasgow in 1774, she came to London. There she came to know Richard Wilson, and as Mrs. Wilson she played at the Haymarket Theatre on 19 May 1775, Betsy Blossom in The Cozeners, and Lucy in The Virgin Unmasked. She was seen in her first Haymarket season as Lucy in The Mirror, Nell in the 'Devil to Pay,' Lydia in the 'Bankrupt,' Sophy in the 'Dutchman,' and Juletta (an original part) in 'Metamorphoses' (26 August 1775).

On 30 April 1776 she was at Covent Garden, for Wilson's benefit, Hoyden in the 'Man of Quality.' In the summer of 1776 and that of 1777 she was in Liverpool. At Covent Garden she had played meanwhile Polly Honeycombe in Colman's piece so named, Mrs. Pinchwife in the 'Country Wife,' and Kitty in 'High Life Below Stairs.' On 2 February 1780 she was the first Betsy Blossom in Pilon's 'Deaf Lover,' and on 5 August at the Haymarket the first Bridget in Miss Lee's 'Chapter of Accidents.'

At the Haymarket Wilson was on 16 June 1781 the original Comfit in O'Keeffe's 'Dead Alive,' and played Filch in the 'Beggar's Opera,' with the male parts played by women and vice versa; she played also Nysa in 'Midas' (15 August), and Flippanta in the 'Confederacy.'

== Death ==
Wilson did not act after the 1785 season, and died in Edinburgh in 1786.

== Family ==
Her husband, Richard Wilson (fl. 1774–1792), born in Durham, played over many years comic characters at Covent Garden and the Haymarket. He was a good actor in comedy, taking parts such as Hardcastle, Justice Woodcock, Sir Anthony Absolute, Tony Lumpkin, Malvolio, Touchstone, Falstaff, Ben in 'Love for Love,' Scapin, Shylock, Fluellen, Polonius, Sir Pertinax Macsycophant, and Sir Hugh Evans. His original parts included Don Jerome in the 'Duenna,' Lord Lumbercourt in the 'Man of the World,' Father Luke in the 'Poor Soldier,' Mayor in 'Peeping Tom,' John Dory in 'Wild Oats,' and Sulky in 'The Road to Ruin.' According to a barely credible account of Lee Lewes, he married in the country, as a seventh husband, a Mrs. Grace, who is said to have been the original Jenny in the 'Provoked Husband.' She was, in fact, Myrtilla, Mrs. Cibber playing Jenny. She must have been fifty years of age, and Wilson little over twenty. Wilson then married, it is said, a daughter of Charles Lee Lewes, and afterwards, it is to be presumed, Mrs. Weston.

== Selected roles ==
- Bridget in The Chapter of Accidents by Sophia Lee (1780)
- Miss Turnbull in Duplicity by Thomas Holcroft (1781)
- Kitty Carrington in The Walloons by Richard Cumberland (1782)
- Kitty in Which is the Man? by Hannah Cowley (1782)
- Minette in A Bold Stroke for a Husband by Hannah Cowley (1783)
- Miss Juvenile in More Ways Than One by Hannah Cowley (1783)
- Grace in Fashionable Levities by Leonard MacNally (1785)
- Susan in The Campaign by Robert Jephson (1785)
- Fish in Appearance Is Against Them by Elizabeth Inchbald (1785)
- Carlota in A School for Greybeards by Hannah Cowley (1786)
- Harriet in Seduction by Thomas Holcroft (1787)

== Notes ==
Attribution

This article incorporates text from a publication now in the public domain: Lee, Sidney, ed. (1900). "Wilson, Mrs.". Dictionary of National Biography. Vol. 62. London: Smith, Elder & Co.
