= William Dowton =

British actor (1764–1852)

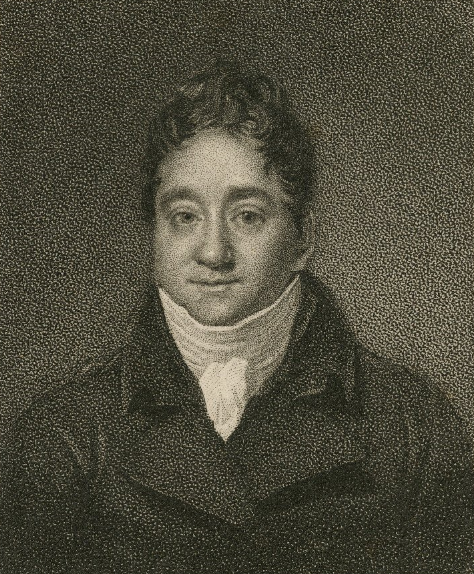
- Born: 25 April 1764; Exeter
- Died: 19 April 1851 (aged 86); Brixton, Surrey
- Occupation: Actor
- Years active: 1781–1840
- Spouse: S. Baker

William Dowton (1764–1851) was a British actor.

== Early life ==
Dowton, the son of an innkeeper and grocer at Exeter, was born in that city on 25 April 1764. At an early age he worked with a marble cutter, but in 1780 was articled to an architect. During his apprenticeship he occasionally performed at a private theatre in Exeter, when the applause he obtained prompted him to run away from home and join a company of strolling players at Ashburton, where, in 1781, he made his appearance in a barn as Carlos in Revenge.

== Career ==
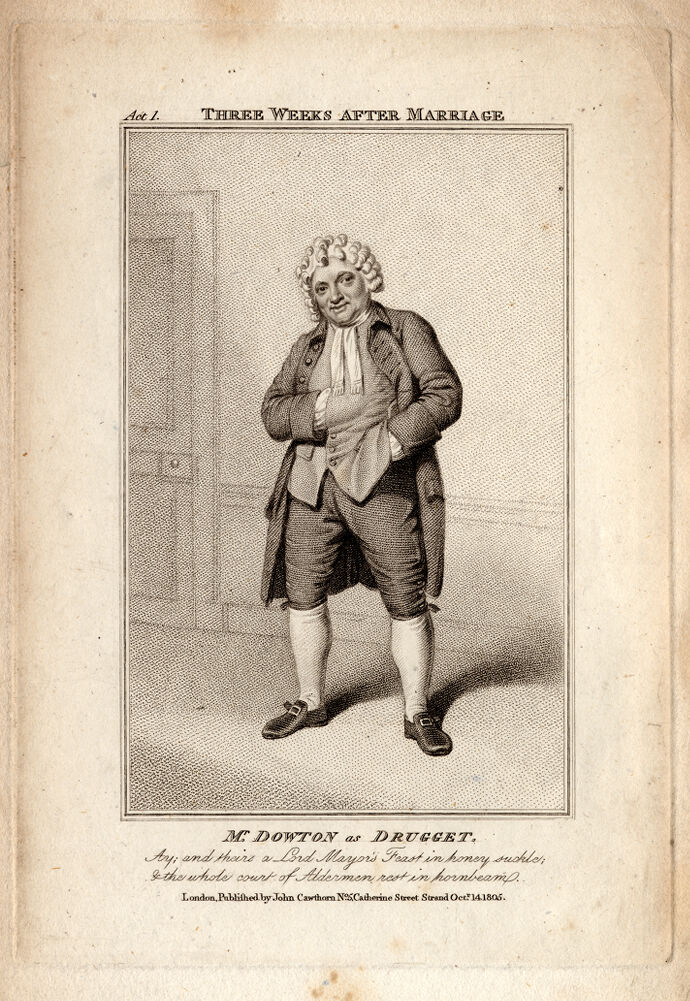
Dowton playing the role of Drugget in Arthur Murphy's Three Weeks After Marriage.

After enduring many hardships he was engaged by Hughes, manager of the Weymouth theatre, and thence returned to Exeter, where he played Macbeth and Romeo; he then (September 1791) joined Mrs. Baker's company in Kent. Here he changed his line of acting, and took the characters of La Gloire, Jemmy Jumps, Billy Bristle, Sir David Dunder, and Peeping Tom, in all of which he was well received by a Canterbury audience. He made his first appearance in London at Drury Lane under Wroughton's management as Sheva in Cumberland's comedy of the Jew, on 11 Oct. 1796, and was received with much applause.

No man on the stage was more versatile at this period of his career. His personation of Sir Hugh Evans in the Merry Wives of Windsor was excellent. He was considered the best representative of Malvolio on the English stage. He played with great success Mr. Hardcastle in She stoops to conquer, Clod in Young Quaker, Rupert in Jealous Wife, Sir Anthony Absolute in The Rivals, Major Sturgeon in The Mayor of Garrett, Governor Heartall in The Soldier's Daughter, and Dr. Cantwell in The Hypocrite at the Lyceum on 23 Jan. 1810. As Charles Lamb, William Hazlitt and James Leigh Hunt record in many reviews, he excelled in the roles of peppery old buffers - apparently offstage as well as on; he was known for throwing his wig into the fire in a rage, and according to an old edition of Brewer's Dictionary of Phrase and Fable was referred to personally as Sir Anthony Absolute.

He continued at Drury Lane for many years, playing at the Haymarket Theatre in the summer months. At one of his benefits at the latter house, 15 Aug. 1805, he revived the burlesque of The Tailors, at which the Tailors' Guild, expecting to be unsympathetically portrayed by a comedian, turned out armed with scissors and started a riot. Dowton is said to have faced them down with a sword preserved at the Haymarket for years after, and the troops were called in to restore order.(Morning Chronicle, 16 Aug. 1805, p. 4). On 5 Oct. 1815 he played Shylock at Drury Lane at the desire, as it was stated, of Lord Byron, who was then also attached to this theatre - and certainly mentions in an extant letter that he was looking forward to Dowton's performance. The public generally was less impressed: like many comic actors entrusted for once with a potentially tragic role Dowton seized the opportunity, and his performance included a final fainting-fit when Shylock is ordered to become a Christian - a detail that has occasionally been echoed in more recent productions (John Woodvine's Shylock for the English Shakespeare Company in the 1980s suffered a heart attack at the same point, for instance), but was grudgingly received by a Regency audience expecting the standard anti-Semitic caricature with undertones of Sir Anthony Absolute.

Dowton then appeared at Drury Lane on 1 June 1830 as Falstaff, for the benefit of Miss Catherine Stephens. He was depicted playing this role by the artist Robert Buss and others, two of Buss's sketches being now hung in the Garrick Club. He was afterwards manager of theatres at Canterbury and Maidstone, but these he finally transferred to his son, and confined himself to acting. He gave evidence before the committee on dramatic literature in August 1832.

In 1836 he went to America, and made his first appearance in New York City at the Park Theatre on 2 June in his favourite character of Falstaff. During this engagement his representations were confined exclusively to elderly characters. His quiet and natural style of acting was not at first understood by his audiences, and just as they were beginning to appreciate his talent and abilities he resolved on returning home, and took his farewell benefit on 23 Nov. 1836. His salary at Drury Lane, where he played for thirty-six years, in 1801–2 was 8l. a week, and it never exceeded 20l. at the height of his fame.

In his old age, having neglected the advantages offered by the Drury Lane Theatrical Fund, he became destitute, and would have been in absolute want but for a benefit at Her Majesty's Theatre 8 June 1840, when Colman's The Poor Gentleman was played with an excellent cast, in which he himself took the part of Sir Robert Bramble. With the proceeds of this benefit an annuity was purchased, which partly provided for his declining days.

He enjoyed good health to the last, and died at Brixton Terrace, Brixton, Surrey, 19 April 1851, in his eighty-eighth year.

== Family ==
He married in 1794 Sarah Baker, an actress and singer on the Canterbury circuit and the daughter of the actress and theatre-manager Sarah Baker.

Dowton's eldest son, William Dowton, was manager of the Kent circuit 1815–35; made his appearance in London at Drury Lane 3 December 1832 as Tangent; was afterwards a brother of the Charterhouse for thirty-seven years; died there 19 September 1883, when nearly ninety years of age, and was buried at Bow 24 September. Another son, Henry Dowton, born in 1798, performed Liston's line of parts inimitably, but died young. He married Miss Whitaker, an actress, who after his decease became the wife of John Sloman, an actor. She died at Charleston, South Carolina, 7 February 1858.

== Selected roles ==
- Sir John Manfred in The Last of the Family by Richard Cumberland (1797)
- Hassan in The Castle Spectre by Matthew Lewis (1797)
- Runic in A Word for Nature by Richard Cumberland (1797)
- Grozembo in Pizarro by Richard Brinsley Sheridan (1799)
- Mr Torrid in The Secret by Edward Morris (1799)
- Jerome in De Monfort by Joanna Baillie (1800)
- Fairfax in Hear Both Sides by Thomas Holcroft (1803)
- Ardent in Hearts of Oak by John Allingham (1803)
- Consols in The Marriage Promise by John Allingham (1803)
- Raven in The Sailor's Daughter by Richard Cumberland (1804)
- Calcagno in The Venetian Outlaw by Robert William Elliston (1805)
- Mr. Hardy in The School for Friends by Marianne Chambers (1805)
- Sir William Freeman in A Prior Claim by Henry James Pye (1805)
- Cheshire John in The Vindictive Man by Thomas Holcroft (1806)
- Nadab in The Jew of Mogadore by Richard Cumberland (1808)
- Sir Oliver Cypress in Grieving's a Folly by Richard Leigh (1809)
- Heartly in Where to Find a Friend by Richard Leigh (1811)
- Sir John Rainsford in Ourselves by Marianne Chambers (1811)
- Barton in The Faro Table by John Tobin (1816)
- Probe in The Touchstone by James Kenney (1817)
- Raton Burkenstaff in The Minister and the Mercer by Alfred Bunn (1834)
