= Jane Pope =

English actress (1744–1818)

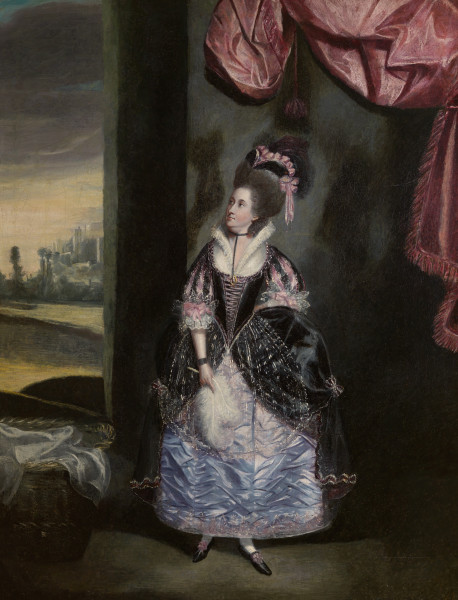
- by James Roberts in 1778
- Born: 1744; London
- Died: 30 July 1818 (aged 73–74); Brompton
- Occupation: Actor

Jane Pope (1744 – 30 July 1818) was an English actress.

== Life ==
Pope was the daughter William and Susanna Pope. Her father was a London theatrical wig-maker for the Theatre Royal, Drury Lane. (There has been confusion over her date of birth with different authorities giving 1742 and 1744, but in a letter from Jane Pope of 1808 she states her age as 64.) Pope had three brothers and she spent her life living with her sister who was named after their mother. Neither of them married.

As a child Pope and her brother were recruited as child extras for a Lilliputian production for Garrick in 1756. From this she speedily developed into soubrette roles. Pope had a dispute with Garrick over whether she was worth eight or ten pounds a week. She left his company but returned when he offered to reemploy her and Pope agreed to eight pounds. She was Mrs Candour in The School for Scandal at its first presentation (1777). There is a painting of Jane Pope by James Roberts in the role of Mrs Page in the Merry Wives of Windsor. She played Mrs Page at Drury Lane in several performances in February to April 1778.

Pope was a lifelong friend of Mrs Clive, and erected the monument at Twickenham to the latter's memory. She retired from the professional stage at a special performance at Drury Lane on 26 May 1808. She was an admirable actress and was praised by all the literary critics of her day unused to such a combination.

== Selected roles ==
- Lady Flutter in The Discovery by Frances Sheridan (1763)
- Miss Sterling in The Clandestine Marriage by David Garrick, George Colman the Elder (1766)
- Patty in The Maid of Kent by Francis Godolphin Waldron (1773)
- Lucy in The Choleric Man by Richard Cumberland (1774)
- Mrs Candour in The School for Scandal by Richard Brinsley Sheridan (1777)
- Kitty in The Double Deception by Elizabeth Richardson (1779)
- Miss Phoebe Latimer in The Natural Son by Richard Cumberland (1784)
- Mrs Alscrip in The Heiress by John Burgoyne (1786)
- Mrs Modely in Seduction by Thomas Holcroft (1787)
- Mrs Dorothy in The Impostors by Richard Cumberland (1789)
- Lisette in False Appearances by Henry Seymour Conway (1789)
- Mrs Dorville in The German Hotel by Thomas Holcroft (1790)
- Alexina in A Day in Turkey by Hannah Cowley (1791)
- Lady Amaranth in Wild Oats by John O'Keeffe (1791)
- Cora in Columbus by Thomas Morton (1792)
- Lady Eleanor Irwin in Everyone Has His Fault by Elizabeth Inchbald (1793)
- Lady Henrietta in How to Grow Rich by Frederick Reynolds (1793)
- Lady Panick in False Colours by Edward Morris (1793)
- Lady Fancourt in Love's Frailties by Thomas Holcroft (1794)
- Lady Horatia Horton in The Town Before You by Hannah Cowley (1794)
- Lady Anne in The Deserted Daughter by Thomas Holcroft (1795)
- Lady Plinlimmon in The Welsh Heiress by Edward Jerningham (1795)
- Mrs Margaret in The Dependent by Richard Cumberland (1795)
- Lady Torrendel in Life's Vagaries by John O'Keeffe (1795)
- Mrs Wrangle in First Love by Richard Cumberland (1795)
- Lady Taunton in The Man of Ten Thousand by Thomas Holcroft (1796)
- Ellen in A Cure for the Heart Ache by Thomas Morton (1797)
- Lady Manfred in The Last of the Family by Richard Cumberland (1797)
- Lady Ferment in Knave or Not? by Thomas Holcroft (1798)
- Maria in He's Much to Blame by Thomas Holcroft (1798)
- Constantia in The Eccentric Lover by Richard Cumberland (1798)
- Lady Truckle in A Word for Nature by Richard Cumberland (1798)
- Lady Julia in Five Thousand a Year by Thomas John Dibdin (1799)
- Susannah Lizard in The Secret by Edward Morris (1799)
- Julia Cleveland in The Votary of Wealth by Joseph George Holman (1799)
- Emma in The Birth Day by Thomas John Dibdin (1799)
- Victoria in Indiscretion by Prince Hoare (1800)
- Mrs Racket in Fashionable Friends by Mary Berry (1802)
- Caroline in Hear Both Sides by Thomas Holcroft (1803)
- Lady Courtland in The School for Friends by Marianne Chambers (1805)
