= Walter Maddocks =

English stage actor

Walter Maddocks (died 1823) was an English stage actor and singer. He was born in Chester and was originally a schoolmaster before becoming a professional actor in the provinces appearing at the Theatre Royal, Norwich and elsewhere before he arrived at the Theatre Royal, Drury Lane in 1789. He remained with the Drury Lane company for three decades, playing supporting roles in a wide variety of productions. His wife, billed as Mrs Maddocks, appeared alongside him in provincial theatre and at Drury Lane. His surname is sometimes written as Maddox or Mattocks.

== Selected roles ==
- Alfred in False Colours by Edward Morris (1793)
- Jones in The Box-Lobby Challenge by Richard Cumberland (1794)
- Saunders in The Jew by Richard Cumberland (1794)
- Penruddock's Servant in The Wheel of Fortune by Richard Cumberland (1795)
- Harry in The Dependent by Richard Cumberland (1795)
- Peasant in Edwy and Elgiva by Fanny Burney (1795)
- Thomas in The Man of Ten Thousand by Thomas Holcroft (1796)
- Hilario in Aurelio and Miranda by James Boaden (1798)
- Steward in The Secret by Edward Morris (1799)
- Occier in Adelaide by Henry James Pye (1800)
- Steward in Julian and Agnes by William Sotheby (1801)
- Music Master in Fashionable Friends by Mary Berry (1802)
- Bailiff in The Marriage Promise by John Allingham (1803)
- Landlord in The School for Friends by Marianne Chambers (1805)
- Harald in Rugantino by Matthew Gregory Lewis (1805)
- Captain McIntyre in The Siege of St Quintin by Theodore Hook (1808)
- Jonathon in Grieving's a Folly by Richard Leigh (1809)

== Bibliography ==
- Cox, Jeffrey N. & Gamer, Michael. The Broadview Anthology of Romantic Drama. Broadview Press, 2003.
- Highfill, Philip H, Burnim, Kalman A. & Langhans, Edward A. A Biographical Dictionary of Actors, Actresses, Musicians, Dancers, Managers & Other Stage Personnel in London, 1660–1800, Volume 10. SIU Press, 1973.
