= Frederick Pilon =

Irish actor and dramatist (1750-1788)

Frederick Pilon (1750–1788) was an Irish actor and dramatist.

== Life ==
Born in Cork, Pilon was educated there and then was sent to Edinburgh University to study medicine. He appeared at the Edinburgh Theatre as Oroonoko, in Thomas Southerne's play of that name; and then joined a minor repertory company, for some years.

Pilon drifted to London, where William Griffin the bookseller employed him on The Morning Post. After Griffin's death, he took on literary hack work until he began to write for the stage. Employed with some regularity at Covent Garden Theatre, he moved in time to Drury Lane Theatre. There Thomas Carter composed music for his Fair American libretto: Pilon would not pay, Carter sued, and Pilon lay low.

Pilon died at Lambeth on 17 January 1788.

== Works ==
Pilon as a playwright has been thought a follower of Richard Cumberland, an associate of the Della Cruscans, and an admirer of Anthony Pasquin. He wrote the following dramas, mostly ephemeral, all of which were published, besides the pantomime:

- The Invasion, or a Trip to Brighthelmstone, farce, performed at Covent Garden Theatre, on 4 November 1778 with Lee Lewis in the main part Cameleon. It was repeated twenty-four times during the season, and later was several times revived. This work ran simultaneously with The Camp, which also made play of the invasion scare of the time.
- The Liverpool Prize, Covent Garden 22 February 1779, with John Quick in the main part.
- Illumination, or the Glazier's Conspiracy, a prelude, suggested by the illuminations on Admiral Keppel's acquittal, acted on 12 April 1779 for Lee Lewis's benefit.
- The Device, or the Deaf Doctor; when first produced on 27 September 1779, it was unpopular, but, revived with alterations as The Deaf Lover, on 2 February 1780, it achieved some success.
- The Touchstone, 1779, pantomime.
- The Siege of Gibraltar, a musical farce (25 April 1780), celebrated Rodney's victory in the Great Siege of Gibraltar.
- The Humours of an Election, a farce (19 October 1780), satirised electoral corruption.
- Thelyphthora, or more Wives than One, a farce, satirising the book Thelyphthora by Martin Madan, was produced on 8 March 1781, and was withdrawn after the second night.
- At Drury Lane, Pilon produced, on 18 May 1782, The Fair American, a comic opera, crudely plagiarised from the Adventures of Five Hours by Samuel Tuke.
- Aerostation, or the Templar's Stratagem (29 October 1784), dealt with the vogue for ballooning.
- Barataria, or Sancho turned Governor (29 March 1785), adapted from Thomas d'Urfey. "Pure farce".
- He Would Be a Soldier, a comedy, after being rejected by George Colman, was performed at Covent Garden on 18 November 1786, with success.

An unpublished adaptation of All's Well That Ends Well was in three acts, and considered representative of contemporary taste. Cuts fell on the early parts, and the centre of attention was the character of Parolles. It was performed in 1785 at the Haymarket Theatre.

Pilon published in 1785 an expanded edition of George Alexander Stevens's Essay on Heads, which Lee Lewis had been performing from 1780. The Lecture was a popular one-man show, a two-hour performance piece that Stevens had acted as a monologue, with a range of papier-mâché busts and wigs, from 1764. Lewis had purchased the Lecture from Stevens, and this edition had a prologue by Pilon, and An Essay on Satire of his own. Pilon also adapted The French Flogged (1755) by Stevens (a droll for Edward Shuter) for performance at Cork in 1780.

Pilon published also:

- The Drama, an anonymous poem, 1775.
- An Essay on the Character of Hamlet as performed by Mr. Henderson (anonymous), London, 1777. On John Henderson.

== Family ==
In 1787 Pilon married a Miss Drury of Kingston, Surrey.
