= Knave or Not? =

- Written by: Thomas Holcroft
- Original language: English
- Genre: Comedy

Premiere
- Date premiered: 25 January 1798
- Place premiered: Theatre Royal, Drury Lane, London

Knave or Not? is a 1798 comedy play by the British writer Thomas Holcroft.

The original Drury Lane cast included John Palmer as Monsrose, Richard Wroughton as Sir Guy Taunton, Richard Suett as Sir Job Ferment, Ralph Wewitzer as Mr Taunton, William Barrymore as Oliver, John Bannister as Jonas, Thomas Hollingsworth as Mr Quake, Jane Pope as Lady Ferment and Dorothea Jordan as Susan.

== Bibliography ==
- Nicoll, Allardyce. A History of English Drama 1660–1900: Volume III. Cambridge University Press, 2009.
- Hogan, C.B (ed.) The London Stage, 1660–1800: Volume V. Southern Illinois University Press, 1968.
