= The Secret (play) =

1799 play

- Original language: English
- Written by: Edward Morris
- Genre: Comedy
- Setting: England, present day

Premiere
- Date: 2 March 1799
- Place: Theatre Royal, Drury Lane, London

The Secret is a 1799 comedy play by the British writer Edward Morris. It premiered at the Theatre Royal, Drury Lane in London on 2 March 1799 and enjoyed a run of seventeen performances that season. The original cast included William Barrymore as Mr Dorville, Robert Palmer as Sir Harry Fleetly, Richard Suett as Mr Lizard, Charles Bannister as Jack Lizard, William Dowton as Mr Torrid, Charles Kemble as Henry Torrid, George Wathen as Ralph, Walter Maddocks as Steward, Jane Powell as Mrs Esther Dorville, Dorothea Jordan as Rosa and Jane Pope as Susannah Lizard. The prologue was written by Charles Morris and the epilogue by George Colman the Younger.

== Bibliography ==
- Greene, John C. Theatre in Dublin, 1745-1820: A Calendar of Performances, Volume 6. Lexington Books, 2011.
- Nicoll, Allardyce. A History of English Drama 1660–1900: Volume III. Cambridge University Press, 2009.
- Hogan, C.B (ed.) The London Stage, 1660–1800: Volume V. Southern Illinois University Press, 1968.
