= Mrs Powell =

English actress (1761–1831)

Jane Powell
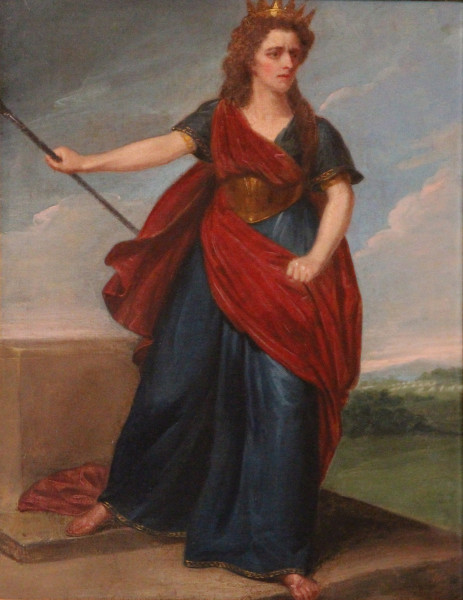
- as Boadicea by Samuel De Wilde
- Born: c. 1761; Cranbrook, Kent
- Died: 31 December 1831; London
- Other names: Mrs Farmer, Mrs Renaud
- Known for: Acting
- Spouse: Mr Powell

Jane Powell or Mrs Powell (c. 1761 – 31 December 1831) was a British actress. She was also known as Mrs Renaud and Mrs Farmer.

== Life ==
Powell was working as a maid in London for the family of Dr Budd circa 1778 when she shared a room with a younger maid named Emily Lyon. Powell's room-mate went on to become famous as Emma, Lady Hamilton, after marrying Sir William Hamilton (diplomat), the British Ambassador to Naples.

Powell made her debut as Alicia in Nicholas Rowe's Jane Shore to mixed reviews in 1787, but her name was uncredited. She came to notice when she appeared at the Haymarket Theatre in the 1780s under the name of "Mrs Farmer" or "Mrs Palmer" as the papers failed to agree.

She is thought to be the first woman to take the title role of Hamlet in London in 1796 when she appeared at Drury Lane. She then took the role of Edmunda in Vortigern and Rowena after Sarah Siddons refused the role. The newly discovered play that was said to be by Shakespeare proved to be a forgery.

Mrs Powell had a benefit at Drury Lane on 2 May 1795 when she played Young Norval. This role was recorded in Norval's death scene from Act V in a painting by Samuel De Wilde. Samuel De Wilde had made a painting of her as Mary Queen of Scots and another of her as Boadicea. However the Garrick Club who own the paintings say that she never appeared in those roles in London.

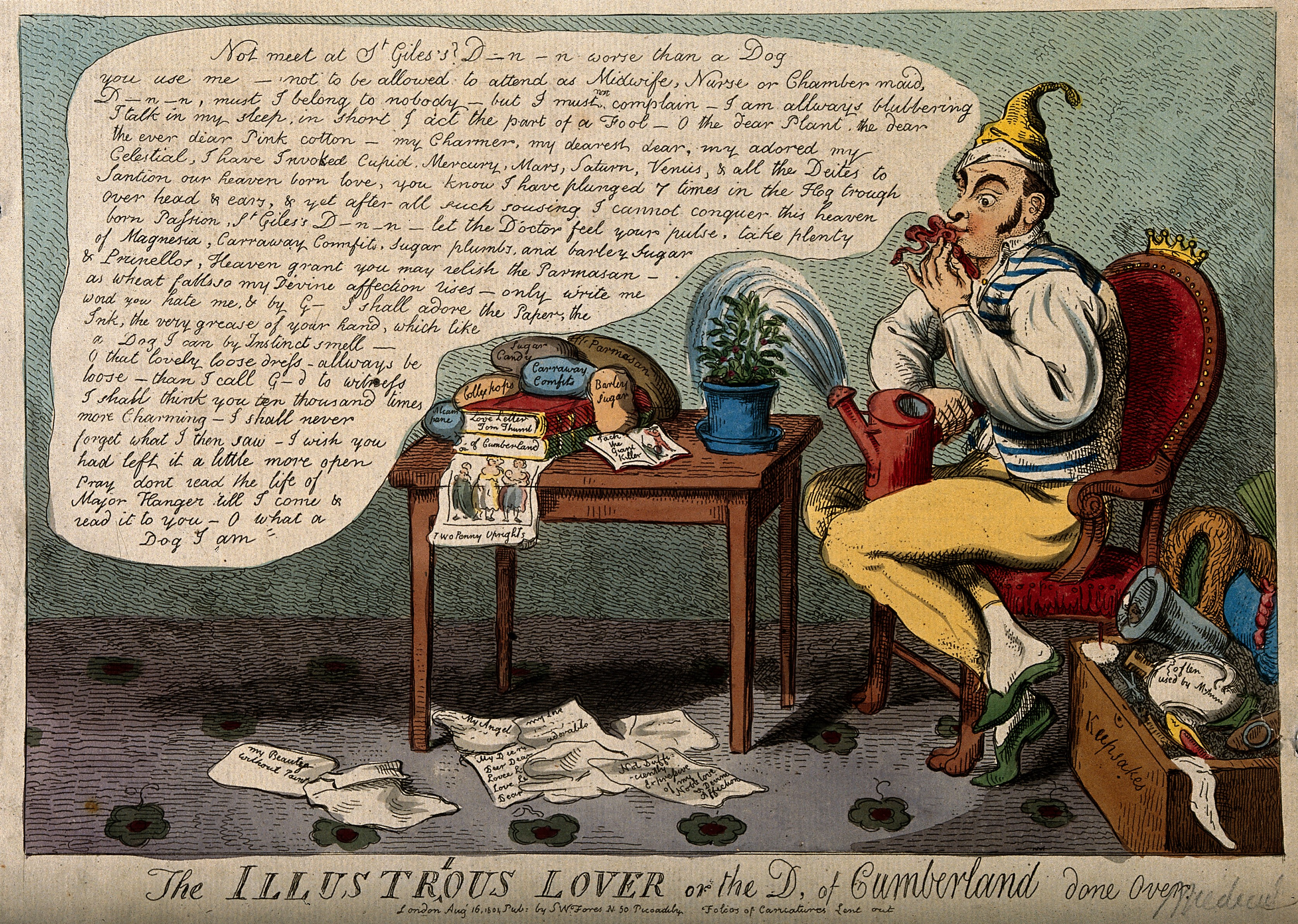
A Cruikshank cartoon satirising the Duke of Cumberland's love for Mrs. Powell.

In the winter of 1800, Powell's former room-mate, Emma, Lady Hamilton attended one of her performances in Drury Lane with her lover Horatio Nelson, 1st Viscount Nelson and his increasingly estranged wife Frances Nelson.

Up to 1811 she was a regular at Drury Lane Theatre until she moved her allegiance to the Covent Garden Theatre. In 1812 her husband died and the following year she married John James Renaud and became Mrs Renaud. In 1814 the marriage was over but she kept the new name.

In 1818 she moved to Edinburgh when she enjoyed being cast in leading productions.

Powell died in London at the end of 1831. It was said that she was still being paid two pounds a week by her manager in Edinburgh.

== Selected roles ==
- Lady Douglas in Mary, Queen of Scots by John St John (1789)
- Marcella in Marcella by William Hayley (1789)
- Phaedra in The Rival Sisters by Arthur Murphy (1793)
- Fishwoman in The London Hermit by John O'Keeffe (1793)
- Eltruda in Edwy and Elgiva by Fanny Burney (1795)
- Mrs Woodville in The Wheel of Fortune by Richard Cumberland (1795)
- Cornelia in The Conspiracy by Robert Jephson (1796)
- Hamlet in Hamlet by William Shakespeare (1796)
- Edmunda in Vortigern and Rowena by William Henry Ireland (1796)
- Victoria in Almeyda, Queen of Granada by Sophia Lee (1796)
- Evelina in The Castle Spectre by Matthew Lewis (1797)
- Agnes in Aurelio and Miranda by James Boaden (1798)
- Mrs Esther Dorville in The Secret by Edward Morris (1799)
- Mrs Ormond in The East Indian by Matthew Lewis (1799)
- Matilda in The Castle of Montval by Thomas Sedgwick Whalley (1799)
- Eliza in Hearts of Oak by John Allingham (1803)
- Mrs Howard in The Marriage Promise by John Allingham (1803)
- Mrs Prue in Five Miles Off by Thomas Dibdin (1806)
- Arabella in Faulkener by William Godwin (1807)
- Betty Barnes in Errors Excepted by Thomas Dibdin (1807)
- Matilda in The Curfew by John Tobin (1807)
- Mrs Mordaunt in Grieving's a Folly by Richard Leigh (1809)
- Mrs Wallis in Debtor and Creditor by James Kenney (1814)

== Bibliography ==
- Burnim, Kalman A. & Highfill, Philip H. John Bell, Patron of British Theatrical Portraiture: A Catalog of the Theatrical Portraits in His Editions of Bell's Shakespeare and Bell's British Theatre. SIU Press, 1998.
- Howard, Tony. Women as Hamlet: Performance and Interpretation in Theatre, Film and Fiction. Cambridge University Press, 2007.
