= The Last of the Family =

1797 play

- Original language: English
- Written by: Richard Cumberland
- Genre: Comedy
- Setting: London, present day

Premiere
- Date: 8 May 1797
- Place: Theatre Royal, Drury Lane

The Last of the Family is a comedy play by the British writer Richard Cumberland. It was first staged at Drury Lane Theatre on 8 May 1797 as a benefit performance for the actor John Bannister. The original cast included William Dowton as Sir John Manfred, John Bannister as Sir Adam ap Origen, Ralph Wewitzer as Squire Abel, Charles Kemble as Peregrine, Richard Suett as Beau Tiffany, Robert Palmer as Ned Flexible, Thomas Caulfield as George Ivey, John Hayman Packer as David Duncan, Jane Pope as Lady Manfred, Charlotte Tidswell as Lucy and Dorothea Jordan as Letitia Manfred.

== Bibliography ==
- Hogan, C.B (ed.) The London Stage, 1660–1800: Volume V. Southern Illinois University Press, 1968.
- Mudford, William. The Life of Richard Cumberland. Sherwood, Neely & Jones, 1812.
- Watson, George. The New Cambridge Bibliography of English Literature: Volume 2, 1660-1800. Cambridge University Press, 1971.
