= Thomas Hollingsworth =

British stage actor

Thomas Hollingsworth (1748–1814) was a British stage actor.

Born to a house servant at Covent Garden, following the death of his father he was mentored by the actor Joseph Younger. Hollingsworth first acted at Covent Garden and later joined Richard Brinsley Sheridan's company at Drury Lane appearing in numerous roles between 1787 and 1804. He was also acted in various provincial theatres.

== Selected roles ==
- Michael in The Siege of Belgrade by Stephen Storace (1791)
- Taffy in The Welsh Heiress by Edward Jerningham (1795)
- Mr Quake in Knave or Not? by Thomas Holcroft (1798)
- Squeez'em in The East Indian by Matthew Lewis (1799)
- Robert in Hear Both Sides by Thomas Holcroft (1803)

== Bibliography ==
- Cox, Jeffrey N. & Gamer, Michael. The Broadview Anthology of Romantic Drama. Broadview Press, 2003.
