= Fashionable Friends =

1802 play

- Original language: English
- Written by: Mary Berry
- Genre: Comedy

Premiere
- Date: 22 April 1802
- Place: Theatre Royal, Drury Lane, London

Fashionable Friends is an 1802 comedy play by the British author Mary Berry, although she initially claimed it to have been written by her friend Horace Walpole and found amongst his possessions after his death. It appeared at the Theatre Royal, Drury Lane on 22 April 1802. The Drury Lane cast included Thomas King as Sir Valentine Vapour, Charles Kemble as Sir Dudley Dorimant, William Barrymore as Mr. Lovell, Richard Suett as Doctor Syrop, Walter Maddocks as Music Master, Ralph Wewitzer as Lapierre, Maria Theresa Kemble as Lady Selina Vapour, Jane Pope as Mrs. Racket, Dorothea Jordan as Miss Racket, Sarah Harlowe as Trimming and Charlotte Tidswell as Lappet. The prologue was written by William Robert Spencer. The title is also written as The Fashionable Friends.

== Bibliography ==
- Greene, John C. Theatre in Dublin, 1745-1820: A Calendar of Performances, Volume 6. Lexington Books, 2011.
- Nicoll, Allardyce. A History of English Drama 1660–1900: Volume IV. Cambridge University Press, 2009.
