= The Castle of Montval =

1799 play

- Original language: English
- Written by: Thomas Sedgwick Whalley
- Genre: Tragedy

Premiere
- Date: 23 April 1799
- Place: Theatre Royal, Drury Lane, London

The Castle of Montval is a tragedy by the British writer Thomas Sedgwick Whalley. It was first published in 1781, but was not staged in London's West End until 23 April 1799 when it appeared at the Theatre Royal, Drury Lane where it succeeded The East Indian by Matthew Lewis. The Drury Lane cast included Sarah Siddons as Countess of Montval, John Philip Kemble as the Old Count, James Aickin as Count of Colmar, Charles Holland as Count of Montval, Charles Kemble as Marquis of Vaublane, William Barrymore as Lapont, John Hayman Packer as Blaise, Jane Powell as Matilda and Elizabeth Heard as Teresa. It was part of the tend of Gothic plays popular during the era.

== Bibliography ==
- Evans, Bertrand. Gothic Drama from Walpole to Shelley. University of California Press, 2022.
- Hogan, C.B (ed.) The London Stage, 1660–1800: Volume V. Southern Illinois University Press, 1968.
- Punter, David. A New Companion to The Gothic. John Wiley & Sons, 2015.
