= Duplicity (play) =

Play by Thomas Holcroft

- Written by: Thomas Holcroft
- Original language: English
- Genre: Comedy

Premiere
- Date premiered: 13 October 1781
- Place premiered: Covent Garden Theatre, London

Duplicity is a 1781 comedy play by the British writer Thomas Holcroft.

The original Covent Garden cast included John Henderson as Mr Osborne, William Thomas Lewis as Sir Harry Portland, Richard Wilson as Sir Hornet Armstrong, Charles Lee Lewes as Squire Turnbull, John Edwin as Timid, Ralph Wewitzer as Mr Vandervelt, William Stevens as Scrip, Sarah Maria Wilson as Miss Turnbull, Elizabeth Inchbald as Melissa, Ann Pitt as Mrs Trip and Elizabeth Younge as Clara.

== Bibliography ==
- Nicoll, Allardyce. A History of English Drama 1660–1900: Volume III. Cambridge University Press, 2009.
- Hogan, C.B (ed.) The London Stage, 1660–1800: Volume V. Southern Illinois University Press, 1968.
