= The Welch Heiress =

Play by Edward Jerningham

- Original language: English
- Written by: Edward Jerningham
- Genre: Comedy

Premiere
- Date: 17 April 1795
- Place: Theatre Royal, Drury Lane, London

John Dixon's pen and ink drawing of "A Welch Heiress", 1792

The Welch (or Welsh) Heiress is a 1795 comedy play written by Edward Jerningham. Although it had only a single stage performance, the published script had some success.

== Performance ==
The Welch Heiress was given a single performance at the rebuilt Drury Lane Theatre on 17 April 1795. The original cast included John Palmer as Lord Melcourt, James William Dodd as Sir Pepper Plinlimmon, William Barrymore as Mr Fashion, Thomas Hollingsworth as Taffy, John Bannister as Mr Phrensy, Richard Suett as Cautious, Robert Palmer as Mr Fancy, James Aickin as Steward, Elizabeth Farren as Lady Bellair, Jane Pope as Lady Plinlimmon and Dorothea Jordan as Miss Plinlimmon. When objections were raised to it, the play was withdrawn, but a revised version was published soon afterwards in which the characters of the Steward and Cautious were not retained.

== Plot ==
Lord Melcourt is engaged to marry an heiress for the sake of her money and the naïve and romantic Miss Plinlimmon is puzzled by the fact that his behaviour does not live up to her expectations of the ideal lover. In fact he does not care for the girl's liveliness and eventually breaks off the engagement, whereupon his friend Mr Fashion takes his place.

A farcical subplot involves Mr Phrensy, a writer who cannot make the world agree that he is a genius. Even the false news of his death in the papers does not lead to a revival of his reputation and he therefore plans to have a second item published, announcing that he died while visiting Melcourt for the wedding. Meanwhile he masquerades as a friend of Phrensy's, raising subscriptions for an edition of his collected works.

== Reception ==
Jerningham’s revised text went through four editions in three years. The play is in the Restoration style, where the names of characters suggest their role: the quick-tempered Sir Pepper Plinlimmon, for example; Classical Phrensy, the dramatic poet; and Mr Fancy, the painter. A contemporary reviewer was reminded by the book of John Vanbrugh's "A Journey to London", but the play was given a generally critical reception mixed with some grudging praise. The Analytical Review found it "more a conversation piece than a comedy", echoing The Monthly Review's suggestion that it was "a play without a plot" and sometimes bordering on the offensive.

== Bibliography ==
- Hogan, C.B (ed.) The London Stage, 1660–1800: Volume V. Southern Illinois University Press, 1968.
- Jerningham, Edward. The Welch Heiress, 18th Century Collections Online.
- Nicoll, Allardyce. A History of English Drama 1660–1900: Volume III, Cambridge University Press, 2009.
