= False Colours (1793 play) =

1793 play

- Written by: Edward Morris
- Original language: English
- Genre: Comedy
- Setting: Cumberland, present day

Premiere
- Date premiered: 3 April 1793
- Place premiered: Theatre Royal, Haymarket, London

False Colours is a 1793 comedy play by the British writer Edward Morris. It premiered at the Theatre Royal, Haymarket in London on 3 April 1793. The original cast included Richard Suett as Lord Visage, Thomas King as Sir Paul Panick, Richard Wroughton as Sir Harry Cecil, William Barrymore as Captain Montague, John Bannister as Grotesque, Robert Palmer as Subtle, Ralph Wewitzer as Tony, Walter Maddocks as Alfred, Jane Pope as Lady Panick, Elizabeth Farren as Constance, Charlotte Goodall as Harriet and Elizabeth Heard as Lucy.

== Bibliography ==
- Greene, John C. Theatre in Dublin, 1745-1820: A Calendar of Performances, Volume 6. Lexington Books, 2011.
- Nicoll, Allardyce. A History of English Drama 1660–1900: Volume III. Cambridge University Press, 2009.
- Hogan, C.B (ed.) The London Stage, 1660–1800: Volume V. Southern Illinois University Press, 1968.
