= Hear Both Sides =

1803 play

- Written by: Thomas Holcroft
- Original language: English
- Genre: Comedy

Premiere
- Date premiered: 29 January 1803
- Place premiered: Theatre Royal, Drury Lane, London

Hear Both Sides is an 1803 comedy play by the British writer Thomas Holcroft.

The original Drury Lane cast included William Dowton as Fairfax, John Bannister as Transit, Charles Kemble as Headlong, Richard Suett as Sir Charles Aspell, Richard Wroughton as Stewart, Alexander Webb as Sir Luke Lostall, Thomas Hollingsworth as Robert, Ralph Wewitzer as Bailiff, Jane Pope as Caroline and Dorothea Jordan as Eliza.

== Bibliography ==
- Nicoll, Allardyce. A History of Early Nineteenth Century Drama 1800-1850. Cambridge University Press, 2009.
