= The Man of Ten Thousand =

1796 play

- Original language: English
- Written by: Thomas Holcroft
- Genre: Comedy

Premiere
- Date: 23 January 1796
- Place: Theatre Royal, Drury Lane, London

The Man of Ten Thousand is a 1796 comedy play by the British writer Thomas Holcroft.

The original Drury Lane cast featured William Barrymore as Sir Pertinax Pitiful, John Palmer as Lord Laroon, Charles Kemble as Dorington, John Bannister as Hairbrain, James William Dodd as Curfew, Richard Suett as Consol, Robert Palmer as Major Rampart, Ralph Wewitzer as Herbert, James Aickin as Hudson, Walter Maddocks as Thomas, John Phillimore as Clerk, Jane Pope as Lady Taunton, Maria Gibbs as Annabel and Elizabeth Farren as Olivia.

== Bibliography ==
- Nicoll, Allardyce. A History of English Drama 1660–1900: Volume III. Cambridge University Press, 2009.
- Hogan, C.B (ed.) The London Stage, 1660–1800: Volume V. Southern Illinois University Press, 1968.
