= A Word for Nature =

- Written by: Richard Cumberland
- Original language: English
- Genre: Comedy

Premiere
- Date premiered: 5 December 1798
- Place premiered: Theatre Royal, Drury Lane, London

A Word for Nature is a 1798 comedy play by the British writer Richard Cumberland. It is also known by the alternative title of The Passive Husband.

The original Drury Lane cast included James Aickin as Lord Glenadry, Richard Suett as Sir Toby Truckle, William Barrymore as Clifton, John Bannister as Leonard, Robert Palmer as Starling, William Dowton as Runic and Jane Pope as Lady Truckle.

== Bibliography ==
- Nicoll, Allardyce. A History of English Drama 1660–1900: Volume III. Cambridge University Press, 2009.
- Hogan, C.B (ed.) The London Stage, 1660–1800: Volume V. Southern Illinois University Press, 1968.
