= Aurelio and Miranda =

1798 play

- Written by: James Boaden
- Original language: English
- Genre: Drama

Premiere
- Date premiered: 29 December 1798
- Place premiered: Theatre Royal, Drury Lane, London

Aurelio and Miranda is a 1798 play by the British writer James Boaden, inspired by Matthew Gregory Lewis 1796 novel The Monk. It premiered at the Theatre Royal, Drury Lane on 29 December 1798. The original cast included John Philip Kemble as Aurelio, Sarah Siddons as Miranda, William Barrymore as Raymond, Charles Kemble as Lorenzo, John Bannister as Christoval, Walter Maddocks as Hilario, Ralph Wewitzer as Pedro, Jane Powell as Agnes, Charlotte Tidswell as St. Agatha, Maria Bland as Zingarella, Sarah Sparks as Leonella and Elizabeth Heard as Antonia.

== Bibliography ==
- Greene, John C. Theatre in Dublin, 1745-1820: A Calendar of Performances, Volume 6. Lexington Books, 2011.
- Nicoll, Allardyce. A History of English Drama 1660–1900: Volume III. Cambridge University Press, 2009.
- Hogan, C.B (ed.) The London Stage, 1660–1800: Volume V. Southern Illinois University Press, 1968.
