= The Vindictive Man =

1806 play

- Original language: English
- Written by: Thomas Holcroft
- Genre: Comedy

Premiere
- Date: 20 November 1806
- Place: Theatre Royal, Drury Lane, London

The Vindictive Man is an 1806 comedy play by the British writer Thomas Holcroft.

It premiered at the Theatre Royal, Drury Lane in London. The original cast included Robert William Elliston as Anson, William Barrymore as Colonel Anson, Henry Siddons as Frederick, George Bartley as Charles, William Dowton as Cheshire John, Ralph Wewitzer as Abrahams, Charles Mathews as Blunt, Alexander Webb as Servant, Sarah Harlowe as Harriet and Harriet Siddons as Emily.

== Bibliography ==
- Nicoll, Allardyce. A History of Early Nineteenth Century Drama 1800-1850. Cambridge University Press, 2009.
