= The Inquisitor (play) =

1798 play

- Original language: English
- Written by: Thomas Holcroft
- Genre: Drama

Premiere
- Date: 23 June 1798
- Place: Theatre Royal, Haymarket, London

The Inquisitor is a 1798 play by the British writer Thomas Holcroft. It was inspired by the 1775 play Diego und Leonore by Johann August Unzer. It premiered at the Theatre Royal, Haymarket in London on 23 June 1798. The original cast included James Aickin as The Patriarch, Henry Erskine Johnston as Alberto, William Barrymore as Francisco, Charles Kemble as Fernando, Robert Palmer as Lelio, Thomas Caulfield as Alguazil, Maria Theresa Kemble as Leonora, Elizabeth Heard as Violante and Sarah Harlowe as Licia.

== Bibliography ==
- Garnai, Amy. Thomas Holcroft’s Revolutionary Drama: Reception and Afterlives. Rutgers University Press, 2023.
- Greene, John C. Theatre in Dublin, 1745-1820: A Calendar of Performances, Volume 6. Lexington Books, 2011.
- Nicoll, Allardyce. A History of English Drama 1660–1900: Volume III. Cambridge University Press, 2009.
- Hogan, C.B (ed.) The London Stage, 1660–1800: Volume V. Southern Illinois University Press, 1968.
