= Seduction (Holcroft play) =

- Written by: Thomas Holcroft
- Original language: English
- Genre: Comedy

Premiere
- Date premiered: 12 March 1787
- Place premiered: Theatre Royal, Drury Lane, London

Seduction is a 1787 comedy play by the British writer Thomas Holcroft.

The original Drury Lane cast included Thomas King as Mr Wilmot, John Philip Kemble as Lord Morden, James Aickin as General Burland, John Palmer as Sir Frederic Fashion, Jane Pope as Mrs Modely, Priscilla Breretton as Emily, Sarah Maria Wilson as Harriet, Charlotte Tidswell as Mrs Pinup and Elizabeth Farren as Lady Morden.

== Bibliography ==
- Nicoll, Allardyce. A History of English Drama 1660–1900: Volume III. Cambridge University Press, 2009.
- Hogan, C.B (ed.) The London Stage, 1660–1800: Volume V. Southern Illinois University Press, 1968.
