= Esther Brand (actress) =

British actress

- Occupation: Actor
- Years active: 1745-1772

Esther Brand (also known as Esther Hamilton, Esther Bland and Esther Sweeney) (fl. 1745–1772) was a British actress. She was a dramatic actress, but had a very good sense of humour. She was disliked by George Anne Bellamy, who nicknamed her "Tripe". She relied on charity towards the end of her life and was the reason for the founding of the Drury Lane Theatrical Fund. Brand would marry three times and would die destitute in London.

== Life and career ==
She debuted on stage at Covent Garden Theatre on 12 December 1745 playing Queen Isabel in Henry V. She married a fellow actor with the surname Brand. She performed alongside David Garrick in 1746 playing Regan in King Lear, Anne Neville in Richard III, Emilia in Othello, and Dorinda in Strategem.

In 1748 she moved to Dublin where she performed at the Smock Alley Theatre. She returned to London in 1752 to perform at Covent Garden as Clarinda in Suspicious Husband. She would perform at Covent Garden for the next ten years. In 1753, she performed as Queen Elizabeth in Earl of Essex. The part was written for Brand. She returned as Emilia in Othello, once more, in 1754. Her career ended at Covent Garden because new management did not like her and released her out of her contract early. Her husband, Mr. Brand, died, and she remarried a Mr. Hamilton. He would take advantage of her financial security and is accused of having robbed her of 2,000 pounds.

After leaving Covent Garden, she moved back to Dublin. She remarried for a third time, taking on the surname Sweeney. He is also believed to have taken advantage of her wealth. She was discovered by Tate Wilkinson, who saw her performing in a poorly received ensemble of Romeo and Juliet. Wilkinson invited her to York, where she performed in 1772. Her final performance was on 11 April 1772, in York.

She returned to London, destitute. The Drury Lane Theatrical Fund was created due to her impoverished situation, since she was no longer employed at the theaters to receive pensions. She worked as the wardrobe manager at the Richmond Theatre until her death.
