= Vortigern and Rowena =

Play written by William Henry Ireland

- Original language: English
- Written by: William Henry Ireland
- Genre: Historical

Premiere
- Date: 2 April 1796
- Place: Theatre Royal, Drury Lane, London

Vortigern and Rowena, or Vortigern, an Historical Play, is a play that was touted as a newly-discovered work by William Shakespeare when it first appeared in 1796. It was eventually revealed to be a Shakespeare hoax, the product of prominent forger William Henry Ireland and part of his wider series of forgeries. Its first performance was on 2 April 1796, when it was ridiculed by the audience. Its titular protagonists, Vortigern and Rowena, are figures from Britain's traditional history.

== History ==
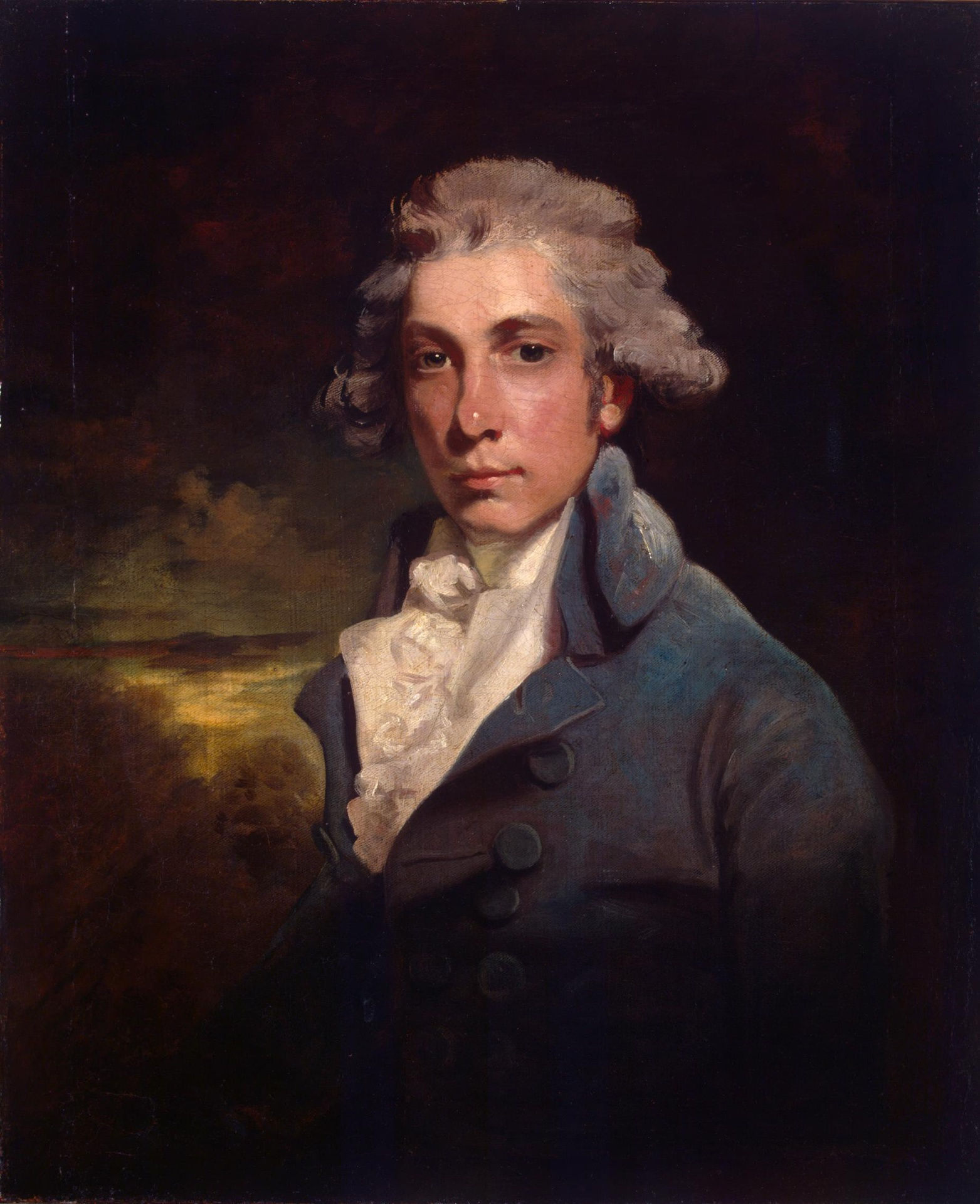
Richard Brinsley Sheridan, the playwright and manager of Drury Lane who staged the play.

Ireland had produced several earlier documents he claimed represented the writings of Shakespeare, but Vortigern and Rowena was the first play he attempted. He shortly followed it with a forged Henry II. He had announced his "discovery" of the lost play as early as 26 December 1794 but did not show his father a manuscript until March 1795. He also provided a purported correspondence between Shakespeare and a printer explaining why the play was unpublished, as well as a deed accounting for how it came to be in hands of the Irelands. According to the deed, Shakespeare had willed all the manuscripts to an ancestor of the Irelands, also named William Henry Ireland, who had saved him from drowning. Years later, Ireland explained that he came up with this story to establish his right to the manuscripts in case a descendant of the bard might claim them.

Hearing of a newly-recovered "lost" Shakespeare play, Irish playwright Richard Brinsley Sheridan purchased the rights to the first production at Drury Lane Theatre in London for 300 pounds and the promise of half the revenues to Ireland's family. After reading the play, Sheridan noted its relative simplicity compared to Shakespeare's known works. Actor John Philip Kemble, the manager of Drury Lane, who would play the title role in the play's only production, had serious doubts about Vortigern's authenticity. Kemble's sister, Sarah Siddons, who had been cast as the title female role, dropped out one week before the scheduled opening for unknown reasons, though it is suspected that Kemble had successfully turned the famous actress against the work as well. Irish Shakespearean scholar Edmond Malone published An Inquiry into the Authenticity of Certain Miscellaneous Papers and Legal Instruments on 21 March 1796, about the authenticity of Vortigern and the other documents "discovered" by Ireland. Siddons' role of Edmunda was taken by Mrs Powell when it opened on 2 April 1796. The play did have its supporters; Henry James Pye and James Bland Burgess wrote prologues for it, while Robert Merry wrote an epilogue.

When Vortigern and Rowena opened on 2 April 1796 Kemble used the chance to hint at his opinion by repeating Vortigern's line "and when this solemn mockery is o'er", and the play was derided by the audience. It was not performed again until 2008. Some early critics accused William Henry Ireland's father Samuel of the forgery, though William assumed responsibility in two printed confessions. Samuel himself continued to regard the play as authentic and edited it in 1799, including a foreword in which he attacked Malone's findings and denounced the "illiberal and injurious treatment" he had received. Nevertheless, neither of the Ireland's reputations recovered from the fiasco, and William eventually moved to France, where he lived for several decades. He tried to publish Vortigern and Rowena as his own work when he returned to England in 1832, but met with little success.

== Characters ==
- Constantius – King of Britain
- Aurelius – A Brother of Constantius
- Uter – A Brother of Constantius
- Vortigern – Adviser to Constantius
- Wortimerus – A Son of Vortigern
- Catagrinus – A Son of Vortigern
- Pascentius – A Son of Vortigern
- Hengist – Leader of the Saxon Mercenaries
- Horsus – Brother of Hengist
- Fool
- Servant
- Page
- Barons, Officers, Guards, &c., &c.
- Edmunda – Wife of Vortigern
- Flavia – Daughter of Vortigern, Ambrosius' Lover
- Rowena – Daughter of Hengist
- Attendants on Edmunda

=== Original cast ===
The original 1796 Drury Lane cast included John Philip Kemble as Vortigern, Robert Bensley as Constantius, William Barrymore as Aurelius, Thomas Caulfield as Uter, John Whitfield as Wortimerus, Charles Kemble as Pascentius, Robert Benson as Hengist, Thomas King as Fool, Vincent De Camp as Servant, Dorothea Jordan as Flavia, Jane Powell as Edmunda, Charlotte Tidswell and Elizabeth Heard as attendants. Charles Dignum, George Frederick Cooke, Samuel Thomas Russell and John Hayman Packer appeared in additional roles of the entertainment.

== Synopsis ==
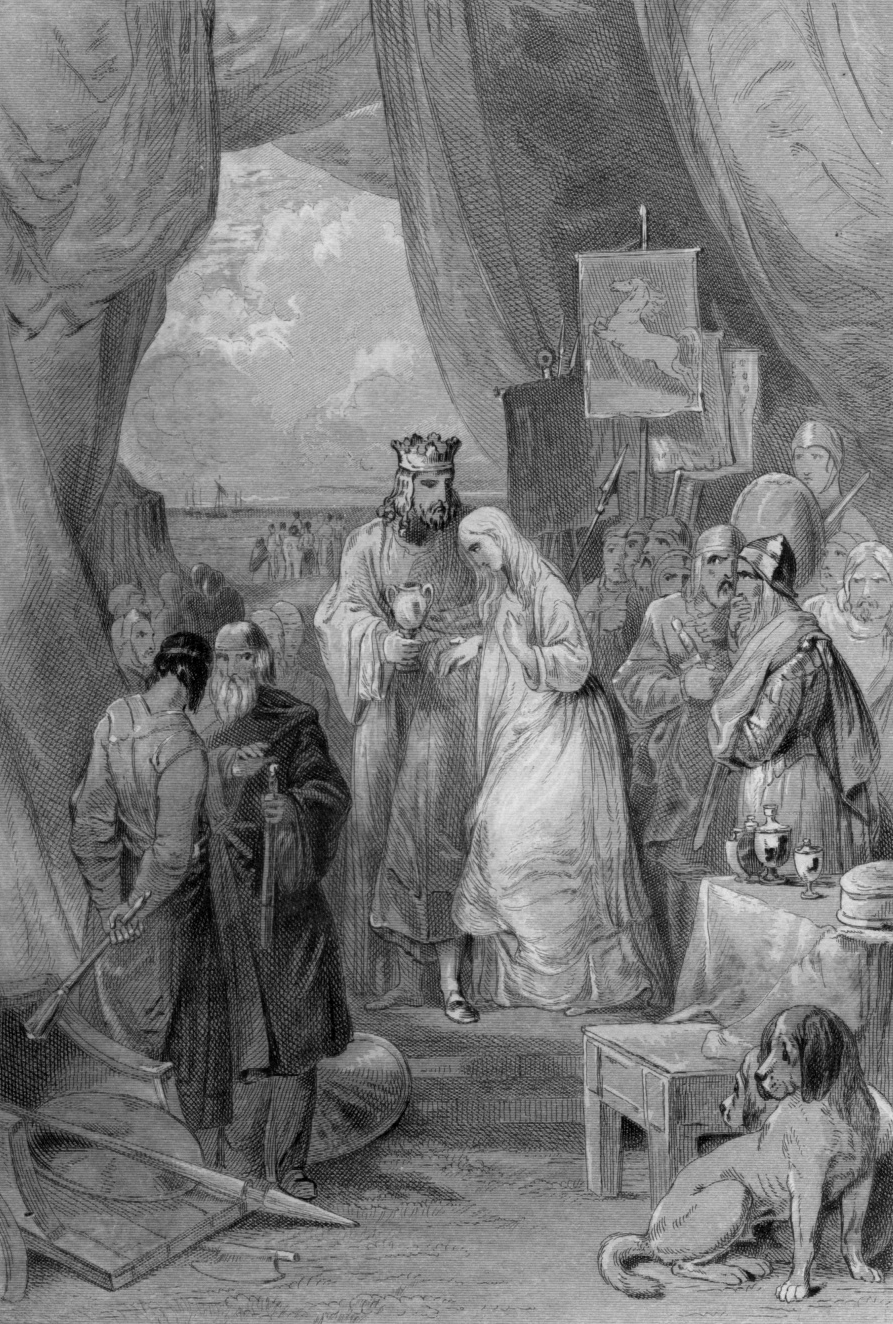
A nineteenth century depiction of the protagonists Vortigern and Rowena.

The story begins as the King of the Britons Constantius offers half his crown to his adviser Vortigern for his loyal service. Vortigern immediately plots the king's murder to take the crown for himself. Meanwhile, the court Fool warns two of Vortigern's children, Pascentius and Flavia, of the bad times ahead and the three of them leave the court with Flavia in drag. Constantius' sons Aurelius (Ambrosius Aurelianus) and Uter (Uther Pendragon), studying in Rome, receive word of Vortigern's treachery and go to Scotland to raise an army against their father's killer. In response Vortigern summons an army of Saxons, led by Hengist and Horsus, to defend him from the Scots. He falls in love with Hengist's beautiful daughter Rowena, and proclaims her his queen, much to the chagrin of his wife Edmunda and his two remaining sons, Wortimerus (Vortimer) and Catagrinus (Catigern), who flee. Vortigern's family eventually all join Aurelius and Uter's army, and Aurelius and Flavia declare their mutual love. In the end the Saxons are routed and Aurelius defeats Vortigern but spares his life, and then marries Flavia. The final speech is delivered by the Fool, who admits that the play is not very tragic, as "none save bad do fall, which draws no tear".

== Sources ==
Like other apocryphal plays attributed to Shakespeare, The Birth of Merlin and Locrine, Vortigern and Rowena takes the Matter of Britain as its subject, drawing especially from Geoffrey of Monmouth's Historia Regum Britanniae and Raphael Holinshed's Chronicle, the same source used by Shakespeare. Shakespeare used Britain's mythical history in several of his plays, including King Lear and Cymbeline, based on the stories of Leir of Britain and Cunobelinus, respectively. The play is essentially a pastiche of Shakespeare, with Vortigern serving as a Macbeth figure; other Shakespearean elements include the use of Holinshead and Flavia's cross-dressing.

== Modern revival ==
The play experienced a comedic revival by the Pembroke Players at the Pembroke College New Cellars, Cambridge, on 19 November 2008. The production was directed by Pembroke third-year Alexander Whiscombe, and starred David Harrap in the title role with Eystein Thanisch as Aurelius. The American Shakespeare Center in Staunton, Virginia included the play as part of its Staged Reading Series in November 2013.
