= Love's Frailties =

1794 play

- Written by: Thomas Holcroft
- Original language: English
- Genre: Comedy

Premiere
- Date premiered: 5 February 1794
- Place premiered: Covent Garden Theatre, London

Love's Frailties is a 1794 comedy play by the British writer Thomas Holcroft.

The original Covent Garden cast included William Thomas Lewis as Mr Muscadel, John Quick as Sir Gregory Oldwort, Joseph George Holman as Charles Seymour, Joseph Shepherd Munden as Mr Craig Campbell, Charles Farley as James, Jane Pope as Lady Fancourt and Isabella Mattocks as Nanette.

== Bibliography ==
- Nicoll, Allardyce. A History of English Drama 1660–1900: Volume III. Cambridge University Press, 2009.
- Hogan, C.B (ed.) The London Stage, 1660–1800: Volume V. Southern Illinois University Press, 1968.
