= He's Much to Blame =

1798 play

- Original language: English
- Written by: Thomas Holcroft
- Genre: Comedy

Premiere
- Date: 13 February 1798
- Place: Covent Garden Theatre, London

He's Much to Blame is a 1798 comedy play by the British writer Thomas Holcroft.

The original Covent Garden cast included William Thomas Lewis as Sir George Versatile, John Quick as Lord Vibrate, Alexander Pope as Mr Delaval, Charles Murray as Doctor Gosterman, James Thompson as Master of the Hotel, Jane Pope as Maria, Julia Betterton as Lady Jane and Isabella Mattocks as Lady Vibrate.

== Bibliography ==
- Nicoll, Allardyce. A History of English Drama 1660–1900: Volume III. Cambridge University Press, 2009.
- Hogan, C.B (ed.) The London Stage, 1660–1800: Volume V. Southern Illinois University Press, 1968.
