= Indiscretion (play) =

1800 play

- Original language: English
- Written by: Prince Hoare
- Genre: Comedy

Premiere
- Date: 10 May 1800
- Place: Theatre Royal, Drury Lane, London

Indiscretion is an 1800 comedy play by the British writer Prince Hoare.

The original Drury Lane cast included Thomas King as Sir Marmaduke Maxim, John Bannister as Burly, William Barrymore as Clermont, Robert Palmer as Frederic, Charles Holland as Gaylove, Ralph Wewitzer as Lounge, Alexander Webb as Francis, Montague Talbot as Algernon, Jane Pope as Victoria and Dorothea Jordan as Julia.

== Bibliography ==
- Hogan, C.B (ed.) The London Stage, 1660–1800: Volume V. Southern Illinois University Press, 1968.
- Nicoll, Allardyce. A History of Early Nineteenth Century Drama 1800-1850. Cambridge University Press, 2009.
