= The Captives (Delap play) =

Play by John Delap

- Original language: English
- Written by: John Delap
- Genre: Tragedy

Premiere
- Date: 9 March 1786
- Place: Theatre Royal, Drury Lane

The Captives is a 1786 tragedy by the British writer John Delap.

The original Drury Lane cast included William 'Gentleman' Smith as Erragon, Robert Bensley as Hilladon, William Barrymore as Connal, John Philip Kemble as Everalin, Charlotte Tidswell as Virgin, Fanny Kemble as Minla and Sarah Siddons as Malvina.

== Bibliography ==
- Nicoll, Allardyce. A History of English Drama 1660-1900: Volume III. Cambridge University Press, 2009.
- Hogan, C.B (ed.) The London Stage, 1660-1800: Volume V. Southern Illinois University Press, 1968.
