= The East Indian =

1799 play

- Original language: English
- Written by: Matthew Lewis
- Genre: Comedy

Premiere
- Date: 22 April 1799
- Place: Theatre Royal, Drury Lane, London

The East Indian is a 1799 comedy play by the British writer Matthew Lewis. It premiered at the Theatre Royal, Drury Lane on 22 April 1799. It was partly inspired by characters from Frances Burney's Cecilia while the playbill advertised it as being inspired by the 1790 play Die Indianer in England by August von Kotzebue. The original Drury Lane cast included Robert Palmer as Lord Listless, William Barrymore as Modish, John Philip Kemble as Rivers, Charles Kemble as Beauchamp, James Aickin as Walsingham, Ralph Wewitzer as Friponeau, Thomas Hollingsworth as Squeez'em, John Bannister as Frank, Jane Powell as Mrs. Ormond, Dorothea Jordan as Zorayda and Charlotte Tidswell as Mrs. Blaball. Lewis had written the play several years earlier, and it was published in 1800 by John Bell.

== Bibliography ==
- Hogan, C.B (ed.) The London Stage, 1660–1800: Volume V. Southern Illinois University Press, 1968.
- Irwin, Joseph James. M. G. "Monk" Lewis. Twayne Publishers, 1976.
- Parisian, Catherine M. Frances Burney's Cecilia: A Publishing History. Routledge, 2016.
