= Drury Lane Theatrical Fund =

Benevolent fund in the United Kingdom

The Drury Lane Theatrical Fund (DLTF) is a benevolent fund for established in 1766 by members of the Theatre Royal in London, England, "for the relief and support of such performers and other persons belonging to the said theater, as, through age, infirmity, or accident, should be obliged to retire from the Stage".

The fund was established by John Johnstone, David Garrick and others, and received benefactions, such as from Sarah Harlowe, subscriptions from performers, and the proceeds of benefit plays. By 1776, it had a capital base of £3,400, and owned a house situated in Drury Lane, let at a yearly rent of £50. The fund was established as a charity by the Drury Lane Theatre Act 1776.

The fund continues into the 21st century; Graham Bickley is a director; previous officeholders include John Pritt Harley and Edmund Kean.

Amongst its pensioners have been:

- Esther Brand
- Joseph Grimaldi
- Sarah Harlowe

== See also ==
- Drury Lane
- Theatre Royal, Drury Lane
