= Thomas Sedgwick Whalley =

Thomas Sedgwick Whalley (1746–1828) was an English cleric, poet and traveller.

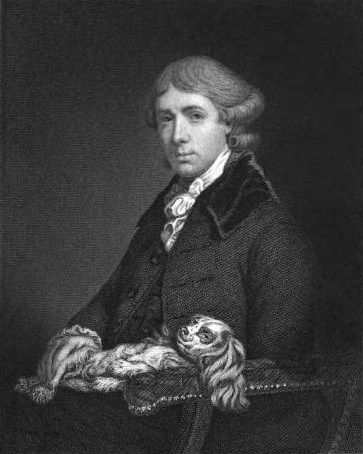
Thomas Sedgwick Whalley

== Life ==
Born in Cambridge, he was the third son of John Whalley, Master of Peterhouse, Cambridge, who married the only child of Francis Squire, canon and chancellor of Wells Cathedral; his mother died at Winscombe Court, Somerset, on 14 September 1803, aged 96. He was educated at St John's College, Cambridge, matriculating in 1763, graduating B.A. in 1767, M.A. in 1774, and in the Church of England being ordained deacon in 1770 and priest in 1772.

In March 1772 Edmund Keene, Bishop of Ely, presented Whalley to the rectory of Hagworthingham in the Lincolnshire fens, considered an unhealthy location; and made it a condition that he should never reside there. For over 50 years the duties were discharged by a curate. About 1825 Whalley built a parsonage-house for the benefice. He was appointed on 22 August 1777 to the prebendal stall of Combe (13) in Wells Cathedral, and retained it until 1826.

About 1776 Whalley purchased the centre house in the Crescent at Bath and entertained there and at Langford Court. He associated with the set around Anna, Lady Miller at Bath Easton, and wrote verses for her. Frances Burney described him in her diary as "immensely tall, thin and handsome, but affected, delicate, and sentimentally pathetic". In the summer of 1783, for financial reasons, he and his wife broke up their establishments in England and went abroad. Langford Court, after being let for many years, was sold in 1804. Whalley spent the spring and winter for a long period in southern France, Italy, Switzerland, and Belgium. At Paris in 1783, Whalley's appearance drew from Marie-Antoinette the compliment of "Le bel Anglais". He often spent the summer at Mendip Lodge (Langford Cottage), on the Mendip hills, where the grounds had grottos and terrace walks. Sarah Siddons visited him there.

Whalley was awarded a DD from the University of Edinburgh on 10 July 1808. Next winter he bought a house in Baker Street, London, and for some years lived there in great style. After the peace of 1814, he went abroad again. On his return in 1818, he purchased the centre house in Portland Place, Bath.

In 1825 Whalley bought the lease of a house at Clifton, and in 1828 he left England, for the last time. A few weeks after his arrival at La Flèche in France he died there of old age, on 3 September 1828, and was buried in the consecrated ground of the Roman Catholic church, a sarcophagus of dark slate with Latin inscription marking the spot.

== Patron of painting ==
He was a patron of painting; a picture of The Woodman, by Barker of Bath, was painted for him, and, at his request, Sir Thomas Lawrence made a crayon drawing of Cecilia Siddons, his god-daughter.

== Works ==
Whalley kept journals of his continental experiences. Two volumes were edited in 1863 by Hill Wickham, rector of Horsington. They contain letters from Hester Piozzi, Sarah Siddons, and Anna Seward (lengthy). His other writings included:

- Edwy and Edilda [anon.]; a poetic tale in five parts, 1779; republished in 1794, with six engravings by a "young lady" (the daughter of Lady Langham).
- The Castle of Montval, a tragedy in five acts, 1781; 2nd edit., with a dedication to Mrs. Siddons, 1799; it was played at the Theatre Royal, Drury Lane in 1799.
- The Fatal Kiss, a poem [anon.], 1781; in the style of Aphra Behn, according to the Monthly Review.
- Verses addressed to Mrs. Siddons on her being engaged at Drury Lane Theatre, 1782.
- Mont Blanc, a poem, 1788.
- Poems and Translations, circa 1797. This was assigned to him in Literary Memoirs (1798).
- Kenneth and Fenella, a legendary tale, 1809.

Hannah More was a neighbour in the Mendips. Whalley supported her action over the school at Blagdon in an anonymous pamphlet, Animadversions on the Curate of Blagdon's Three Publications, 1802.

== Family ==
Whalley married, on 6 January 1774, Elizabeth, only child of Edward Jones of Langford Court in Burrington parish, Somerset, and widow of John Withers Sherwood, with whom he obtained a large fortune. She died on 8 December 1801. In May 1803 he married a Miss Heathcote, a lady of property in Wiltshire; she died at Southbroom House, near Devizes, on 10 or 11 October 1807. In 1813 he married the widow of General Horneck (thought to be Charles Horneck who died at Bath on 8 April 1804). He discovered that she was heavily in debt, and they agreed to separate. She received from Whalley a settlement and a house in Catherine Place, Bath.

== Notes ==
Attribution

This article incorporates text from a publication now in the public domain: Lee, Sidney, ed. (1899). "Whalley, Thomas Sedgwick". Dictionary of National Biography. Vol. 60. London: Smith, Elder & Co.
