= John Delap =

British writer

John Delap (1725–1812) was an English churchman and academic, known as a poet and dramatist.

== Life ==
The son of John Delap, of Spilsby in Lincolnshire, he entered Trinity College, Cambridge, but migrated to Magdalene College, and was admitted pensioner on 15 March 1743. He took the degrees of B.A. in 1747, M.A. in 1750, and D.D. in 1762, and was described on the last occasion as of Trinity College. On 30 December 1748 he was elected to a fellowship at Magdalene.

Delap was ordained in the Church of England, and was once curate to William Mason. The united livings of Iford and Kingston near Lewes in Sussex were conferred on him in 1765, and he became rector of Woollavington in 1774. But he lived at South Street, Lewes, where he died in 1812, aged 87. Delap used to visit Henry and Hester Thrale in Brighton or Tunbridge Wells, so knew Samuel Johnson and Fanny Burney, who found his conversation onerous- Johnson for Delap's obsession with his health, and Burney for the manner in which, despite being "commonly and naturally grave, silent, and absent", Delap would "work... threadbare" any subject raised in conversation on which he had anything to say.

== Works ==
Delap's first work was Marcellus, a Monody, 1751, inspired by the death of Frederick, Prince of Wales, inscribed to his widow. It was succeeded by a number of elegies (1760); two which may have been among those were in George Pearch's Collection of Poems. His thesis for his divinity degree (12 April 1762) was published in 1763, Mundi perpetuus administrator Christus.

The tragedy Hecuba by Delap was produced at Drury Lane Theatre on 11 December 1761, when the prologue, written by Robert Lloyd, was spoken by David Garrick, who also wrote the epilogue. It was printed anonymously in 1762. Delap wanted Garrick to produce of a tragedy entitled Panthea, in vain. Delap addressed a long letter to him in 1762 in favour of a new composition, The Royal Suppliants; it was accepted, but not acted until 17 Feb. 1781, when it ran for ten nights at Drury Lane, and was published with a dedication to Henry Temple, 2nd Viscount Palmerston. In 1774 Garrick refused the Royal Exiles. A tragedy The Captives by Delap, was staged at Drury Lane on 9 March 1786, was acted three times, and was published in the same year. An unacted play Gunilda was published in 1786.

Delap wrote further verse:

- An Elegy on the Death of the Duke of Rutland, 1788;
- Sedition, an Ode occasioned by his Majesty's late Proclamation, 1792; and
- The Lord of Nile, an Elegy, 1799.

Four unacted plays in one volume of Dramatic Poems: Gunilda, Usurper, Matilda, and Abdalla, then appeared in 1803.
