= John Williams (satirist) =

English poet, satirist, journalist and miscellaneous writer

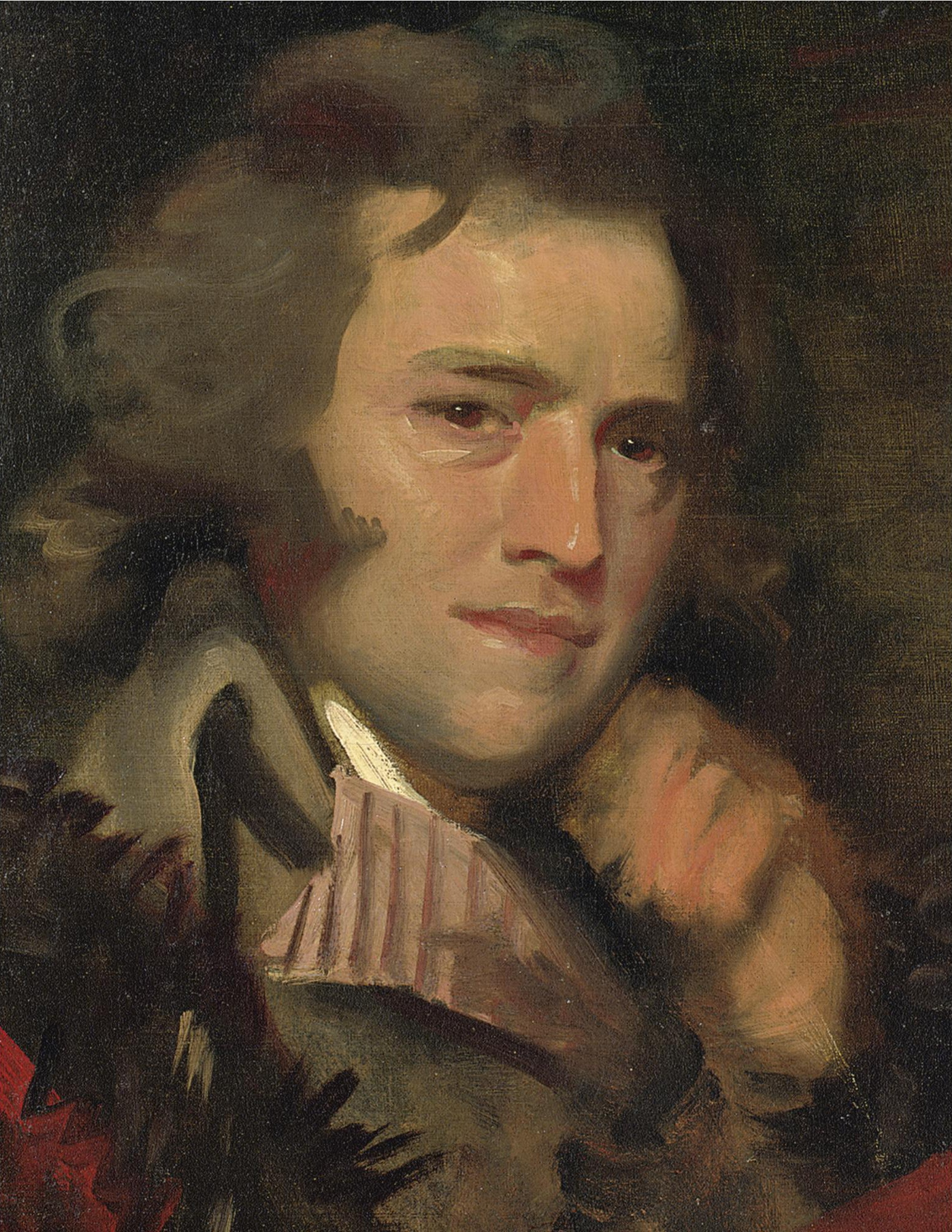
Anthony Pasquin (Mather Brown, ca 1790)

John Williams (1761–1818) was an English poet, satirist, journalist and miscellaneous writer, best known by the pseudonym of Anthony Pasquin.

== Life ==
He was born in London on 28 April 1761, and was sent in 1771 to Merchant Taylors' School. There he was beaten for an epigram on Mr. Knox, the third master. At the age of seventeen he was placed with a painter, but he gave up art to become an author and translator. When he was about eighteen he wrote a defence of David Garrick against William Kenrick, earning Garrick's friendship.

About two years later he went to Ireland, and during his time in Dublin edited several periodical publications. He attacked the government in the Volunteers' Journal during the administration of the Duke of Rutland, a prosecution was started against him in 1784, and he was obliged to decamp, leaving the printers to face the judgment.

The same year (1784) he was associated with Henry Bate Dudley in the Morning Herald. A violent quarrel broke out between them, and Williams wrote a satire on his antagonist, for which he was prosecuted, though the action did not proceed. In 1787 Williams accompanied his friend Pilon to France, and on his return he started a paper called The Brighton Guide. He next settled at Bath, Somerset, but again left in a hurry.

For some years he contributed influential theatrical criticism to some of the London newspapers. In 1797 he appeared in the Court of King's Bench as plaintiff in an action against Robert Faulder, the bookseller, for a libel contained in William Gifford's poem The Baviad. In one of the notes Gifford, speaking of Williams, observed that ‘he was so lost to every sense of decency and shame that his acquaintance was infamy and his touch poison.’ In this cause the plaintiff was nonsuited, based the proof that was given of his having himself grossly libelled every respectable character in the kingdom, from the sovereign down to the lowest of his subjects. Lloyd Kenyon, 1st Baron Kenyon, who tried the case, commended Gifford.

Williams emigrated to America shortly afterwards, and edited a New York newspaper called The Federalist. He died a poor man of typhus fever in Brooklyn, on 23 November 1818.
