= Charles Lee Lewes =

English actor (1740–1803)

Charles Lee Lewes (1740 – 13 July 1803) was an English actor.

== Biography ==
He was born the son of a hosier in London. After attending a school at Ambleside he returned to London, where he found employment as a postman. In about 1760 he went on the stage in the provinces, and some three years later began to appear in minor parts at Covent Garden Theatre. His first role of importance was that of Young Marlow in She Stoops to Conquer, at its production of that comedy in 1773, when he delivered an epilogue specially written for him by Goldsmith.

He remained a member of the Covent Garden company until 1783, appearing in many parts, among which were Fag in The Rivals, which he created, and Sir Anthony Absolute in the same comedy. In 1783 he removed to Drury Lane, where he assumed the Shakespearian rôles of Touchstone, Lucio, and Falstaff. In 1787 he left London for Edinburgh, where he gave recitations, including Cowper's "John Gilpin". For a short time in 1792 Lewes assisted Stephen Kemble in the management of the Dundee Repertory Theatre; in the following year he went to Dublin, but he was financially unsuccessful and suffered imprisonment for debt. He employed his time in compiling his memoirs, published after his death by his son. He was also the author of some dramatic sketches. Lewes was three times married; the philosopher George Henry Lewes was his grandson.

== Works ==
- Comic Sketches (London: H. D. Symonds, 1804)
- Memoirs (London: Richard Phillips, 1805)

== Family ==
Charles Lee Lewes was also the name of George Henry Lewes' eldest son, who curated his father's extensive library upon the latter's death in 1878.
