= Mary Berry (writer, born 1763) =

English writer (1763–1852)

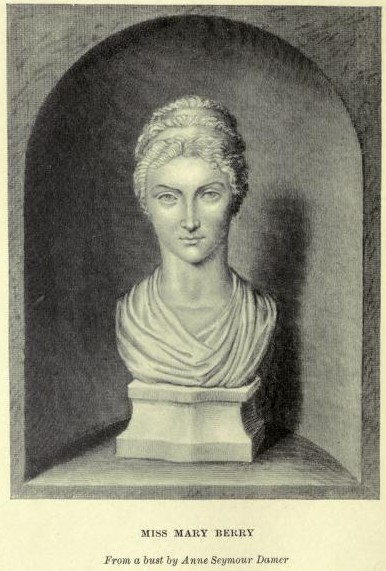
- From a bust of Mary Berry created by Anne Seymour Damer
- Born: 16 March 1763; Kirkbridge, North Yorkshire, England
- Died: 20 November 1852 (aged 89)

Mary Berry (16 March 1763 – 20 November 1852) was an English non-fiction writer born in Kirkbridge, North Yorkshire. She is best known for her letters and journals, namely Social Life in England and France from the French Revolution, published in 1831, and Journals and Correspondence, published after her death in 1865. Berry became notable through her association with close friend Horace Walpole, whose literary collection she, along with her sister and father, inherited.

== Early life ==
Berry was born in Kirkbridge, North Yorkshire on 16 March 1763. Her younger sister Agnes, who proved to be Mary's closest confidant during her life, was born fourteen months later on 29 May 1764.

Their father, Robert Berry, was the nephew of a successful Scottish merchant named Ferguson, who amassed £300,000 in London in mid-life and bought an estate at Raith in Fife. As the older son of Ferguson's sister, he began working at his uncle's counting-house in Broad Street, Austin Friars. In 1762, he married his distant cousin, a Miss Seaton. After giving birth to Mary and Agnes, she and their third child died three years later, in 1767, during childbirth.

Following their mother's death, the two girls were cared for by their grandmother, Mrs. Seaton, at Askham in Yorkshire. They were moved to the College House in Chiswick in 1770. After their governess at Chiswick married in 1776, the two girls were self-educated. Their religious instruction consisted of Mary reading aloud a Psalm to her grandmother every morning, and one of the Saturday papers from the Spectator every Sunday.

In 1781, the uncle, Ferguson, died at age 93. He left the estate of Raith and most of his money to Robert's younger brother, William, who changed his name to Ferguson and provided an annuity to Robert. In 1783, Robert Berry and his two young daughters travelled abroad to Holland, Switzerland and Italy. Mary assumed the role of protective mother to her sister, and a guide and monitor to her father.

== Adulthood ==
Mary Berry began writing Journals and Correspondence while in Florence in 1783, though she would not complete the writing until 70 years later. After a long stay in Italy, her tour was completed by a return home through France to England in June 1786.

Berry and her sister Agnes had a remarkable association with Horace Walpole. They first met him in the winter of 1788, when he was then more than 70 years old. A letter he wrote in October 1788 related how: “he had just then willingly yielded himself up to their witcheries on meeting them at the house of his friend Lady Herries, wife of the banker in St. James's Street”. Walpole developed a deep fondness for the two girls, lavishing them with endearments and compliments. In his letters, Walpole spoke of both in terms of the strongest affection and endearment, in one instance addressing them as his "twin wives". He wrote books solely for their pleasure and dedicated other writings to them. It was solely for their amusement that he wrote his Reminiscences of the Courts of George I and II (1789). He established the sisters at Teddington in 1789, and two years later, in 1791, he prevailed upon them to move into Little Strawberry Hill, a house previously known as Cliveden, the abode of his friend Kitty Clive, the famous actress. They lived there for many years.

George Walpole, died in 1791 and his titles and estate were passed to his uncle Horace. Horace became the 4th Earl of Orford. "There is a tradition handed down by Lord Lansdowne", says the Edinburgh Review, "that he (Walpole) was ready to go through the formal ceremony of marriage with either sister, to make sure of their society and confer rank and fortune on the family - he had the power of charging the Orford estate with a jointure of £2,000 a year.” This did not occur.

In 1779, Mary's hand had been sought in marriage by a Mr Bowman and she wrote long afterwards that she had "suffered as people do" at sixteen "from what, wisely disapproved of, I resisted and dropped."

General Charles O'Hara, governor of Gibraltar, had met Berry in 1784 in Italy, and was engaged to her before leaving England for Gibraltar in November 1795. Berry had been reluctant to leave England immediately as his bride. This led to their gradual estrangement and ultimately the breaking off of their engagement at the end of April 1796.

Walpole died on 2 March 1797 and left both women £4,000 and Little Strawberry Hill House, where they lived. He also bequeathed to Robert, Mary, and Agnes Berry his printed works and a box containing manuscripts, to be published at their discretion.

In 1802 Berry went to Paris and, during her stay, she was presented to Napoleon in the palace of the Tuileries. Returning to France with her sister and father later in the year, she went on to Nice, Switzerland and Germany, returning England in September 1803.

== Literary work ==
In 1798, Mary published the five volumes of the Works of Horace Walpole from the manuscripts Walpole had left the Berry's. She advertised the work as edited by her father, Robert, but in reality Mary performed most of the work, except a brief passage in the preface that refers to herself.

Berry then wrote a five-act comedy titled Fashionable Friends under Walpole’s name. Berry and her father and sister performed the play at Strawberry Hill, Walpole's residence, until the performance was moved to Drury Lane Theatre in May 1802. The play failed after three nights due to its "lax morality".

Other works she published include Walpole’s the Mysterious Mother and another of her own plays, a farce called The Martins, set down in a manuscript list of her writings, which was never produced either in print or on the stage.^{[3]}

In 1810, Berry published four volumes of the letters of Madame du Deffand to Horace Walpole, written between 1766 and 1780, which she annotated herself, as well as those de Deffand wrote to Voltaire between 1759 and 1775. She received £200 for this work.

On 18 May 1817, Robert Berry died, leaving the sisters with very little income. In 1819, Mary Berry brought out Some Account of the Life of Rachel Wriothesley, Lady Russell, followed by a series of Letters from Lady Russell to her husband, Lord William Russell, from 1672 to 1682, together with some Miscellaneous Letters to and from Lady Russell. The work was published from the originals, owned by the Duke of Devonshire.

Berry published the first volume of her most famous work, A Comparative View of the Social Life of England and France from the Restoration of Charles the Second to the French Revolution, in 1828; the second volume, Social Life in England and France from the French Revolution in 1789 to that of July 1830, appeared in March 1831. It was reissued as a collected whole in the complete edition of her Works in 1844, with a new title, England and France: a comparative View of the Social Condition of both Countries alongside Fashionable Friends and her other writings.

A collection of Berry’s works and letters were published posthumously in 1865, titled Extracts from the Journals and Correspondence of Miss Berry from 1783 to 1852, edited by Lady Theresa Lewis.

== Death ==
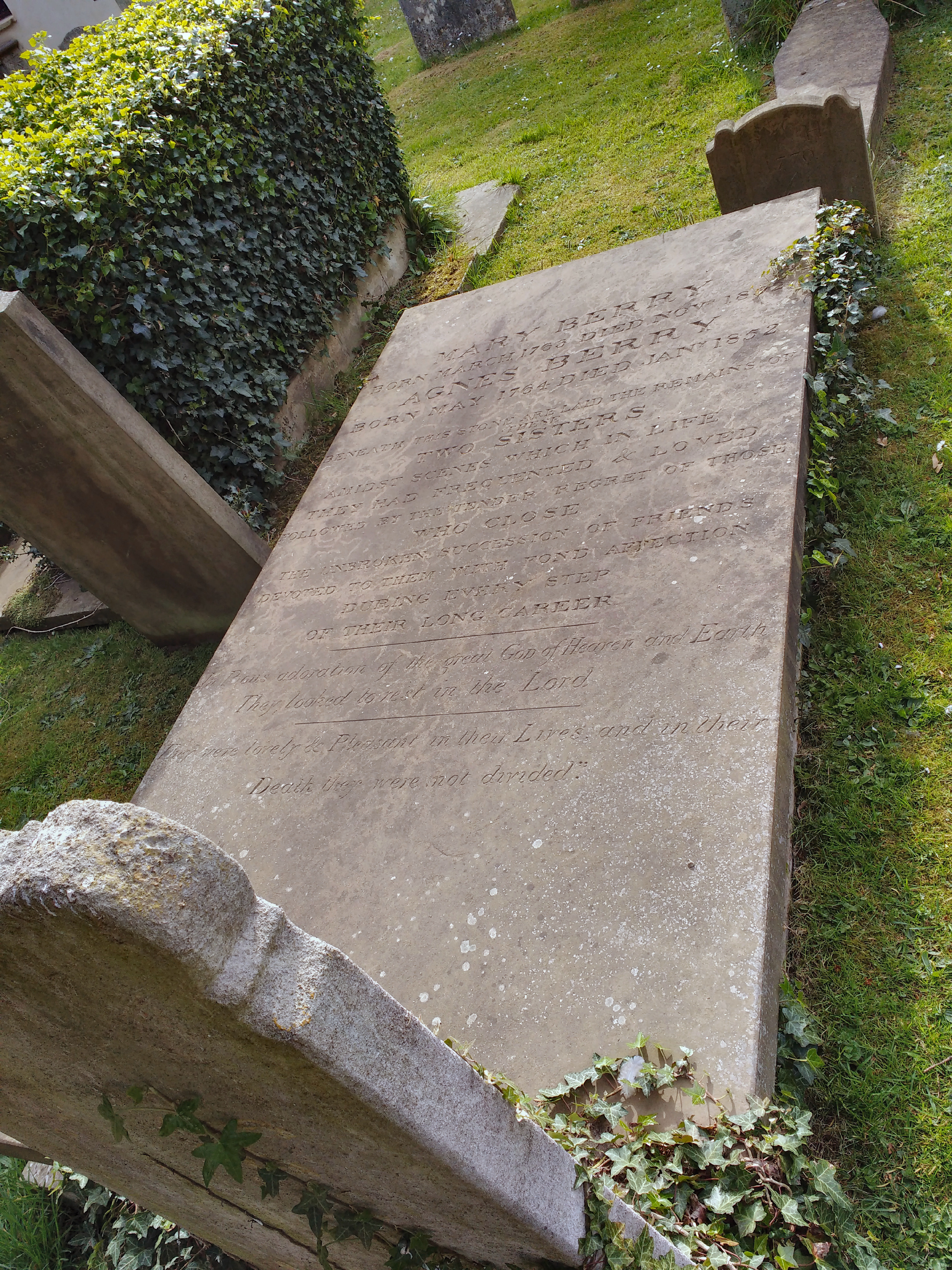
St Peter's Church, Petersham

During her life Berry suffered from only one serious illness, a near-fatal attack of bilious fever in 1825. She died of old age around midnight on 20 November 1852 at age 89. Her sister, Agnes, had died in January of the same year. Both are buried in the churchyard of St Peter's Church, Petersham.
