= Thomas Holcroft =

English dramatist and poet (1745–1809)

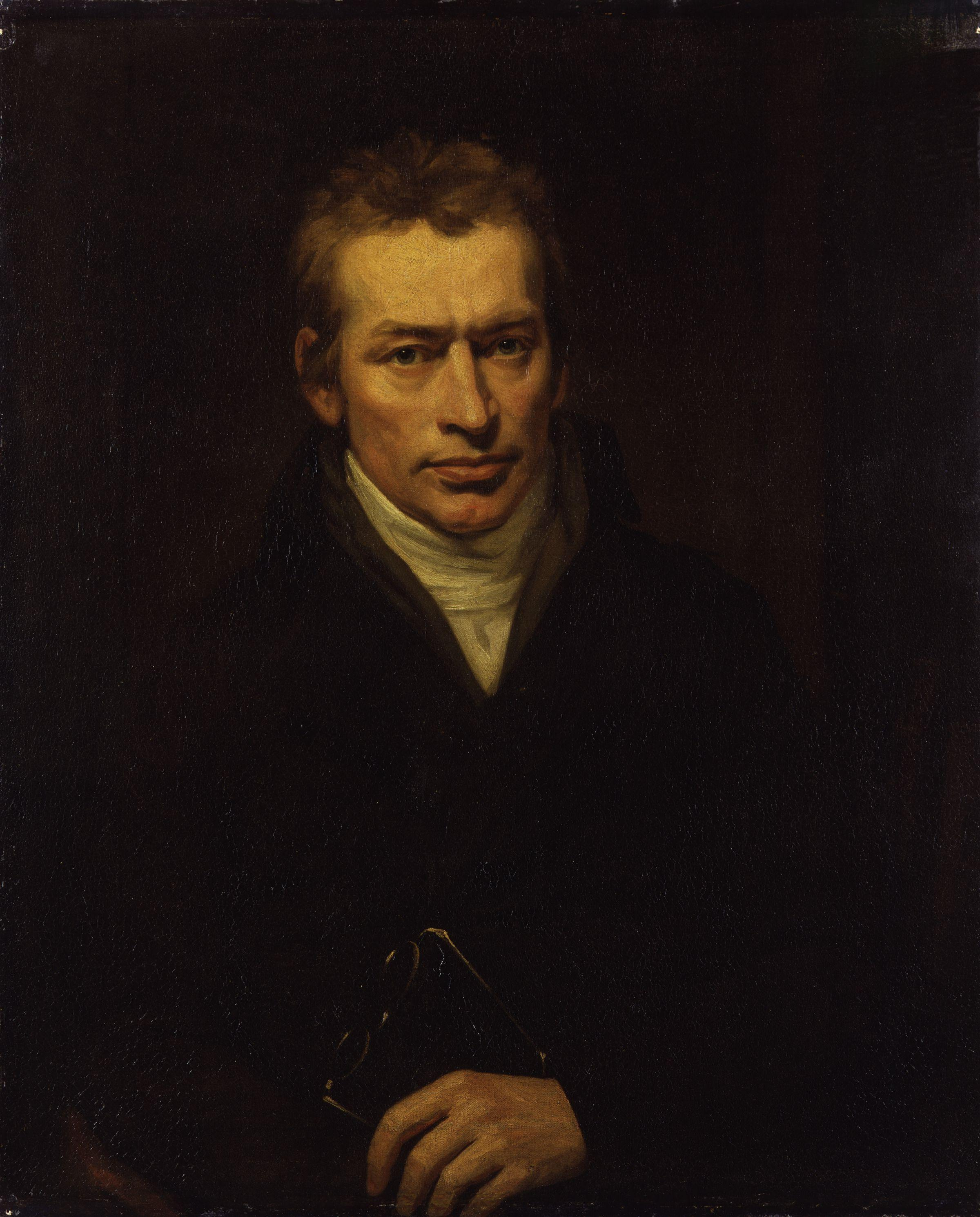
- Portrait, oil on canvas, of Thomas Holcroft (1745–1809) by John Opie (1761–1807)
- Born: 10 December 1745; Orange Court, Leicester Fields, London
- Died: 23 March 1809 (aged 63)
- Occupation: Dramatist
- Years active: 1778-1802

Thomas Holcroft (10 December 1745 – 23 March 1809) was an English dramatist, miscellanist, poet, novelist and translator. He was sympathetic to the early ideas of the French Revolution and helped Thomas Paine to publish the first part of The Rights of Man.

== Early life ==
Holcroft was born in Orange Court, Leicester Fields, London. His father had a shoemaker's shop and kept riding horses for hire, but he fell into difficulties and was reduced to hawking as a pedlar. The son accompanied his parents on their travels. He obtained work as a stable boy at Newmarket, at the stables of Hon. Richard Vernon, where he spent his evenings chiefly on miscellaneous reading and the study of music. He gradually obtained a knowledge of French, German and Italian.

When Holcroft's job at the stables came to an end, he returned to assist his father, who had resumed his trade of shoemaker in London. Around 1765, he became a teacher in a small school in Liverpool. However, he failed in an attempt to set up a private school, and instead became the prompter in a Dublin theatre. He went on to act in various strolling companies until 1778, when he produced the play The Crisis; or, Love and Famine, at Drury Lane. Duplicity followed in 1781.

== Literary and political career ==
Two years later Holcroft went to Paris as correspondent of the Morning Herald. Here he attended the performances of Beaumarchais's Mariage de Figaro until he had memorized the whole. His translation of it, with the title The Follies of the Day, was produced at Drury Lane in 1784. His comedy The Road to Ruin, his most successful play, was produced in 1792; a revival in 1873 ran for 118 nights.

His novels include Alwyn (1780), an account, largely autobiographical, of a strolling comedian, Anna St. Ives (the first British Jacobin novel, published in 1792), The Adventures of Hugh Trevor (1794–1797) and Bryan Perdue (1801). He also wrote Travels from Hamburg through Westphalia, Holland and the Netherlands to Paris, some volumes of verse, and translations from French and German. One of these was Letters Between Frederic II and M. De Voltaire (1789).

Sympathetic to the early ideals of the French Revolution, Holcroft assisted in publishing the first part of Thomas Paine's The Rights of Man in 1791. He joined the Society for Constitutional Information (SCI) in 1792 and was appointed a member of a liaison committee to work with the LCS in early 1794. As a result of his activism, Holcroft was indicted in the autumn of 1794 for high treason and held in Newgate Prison whilst three other treason trials proceeded. In early December 1794 Holcroft was discharged without trial after those cases, against London Corresponding Society secretary Thomas Hardy, and SCI figure John Horne Tooke, resulted in acquittals.

As one of what Secretary of War William Windham called "acquitted felons", Holcroft's post-arrest reputation meant that his plays achieved little success after 1795, although he was instrumental in bringing melodrama to Britain at the end of the decade with his Deaf and Dumb (1801) and A Tale of Mystery (1802, an unacknowledged translation of de Pixerécourt's Cœlina, ou, l'enfant du mystère). Despite a modicum of success with A Tale of Mystery, the remainder of the decade was marked by unsuccessful attempts to return to the public eye. He died in 1809, not long after a deathbed reconciliation with his closest friend from the 1790s (lately estranged), William Godwin. His Memoirs written by Himself and continued down to the Time of his Death, from his Diary, Notes and other Papers, by William Hazlitt, appeared in 1816, and was reprinted, in a slightly abridged form, in 1852. Questions have been raised about the accuracy of sections of Hazlitt's account of Holcroft's life. He appears to have regarded writing it as a chore, referring to it as the "Life Everlasting" and taking sections of it from far-fetched incidents in Holcroft's novel Alwyn.

== Personal life ==
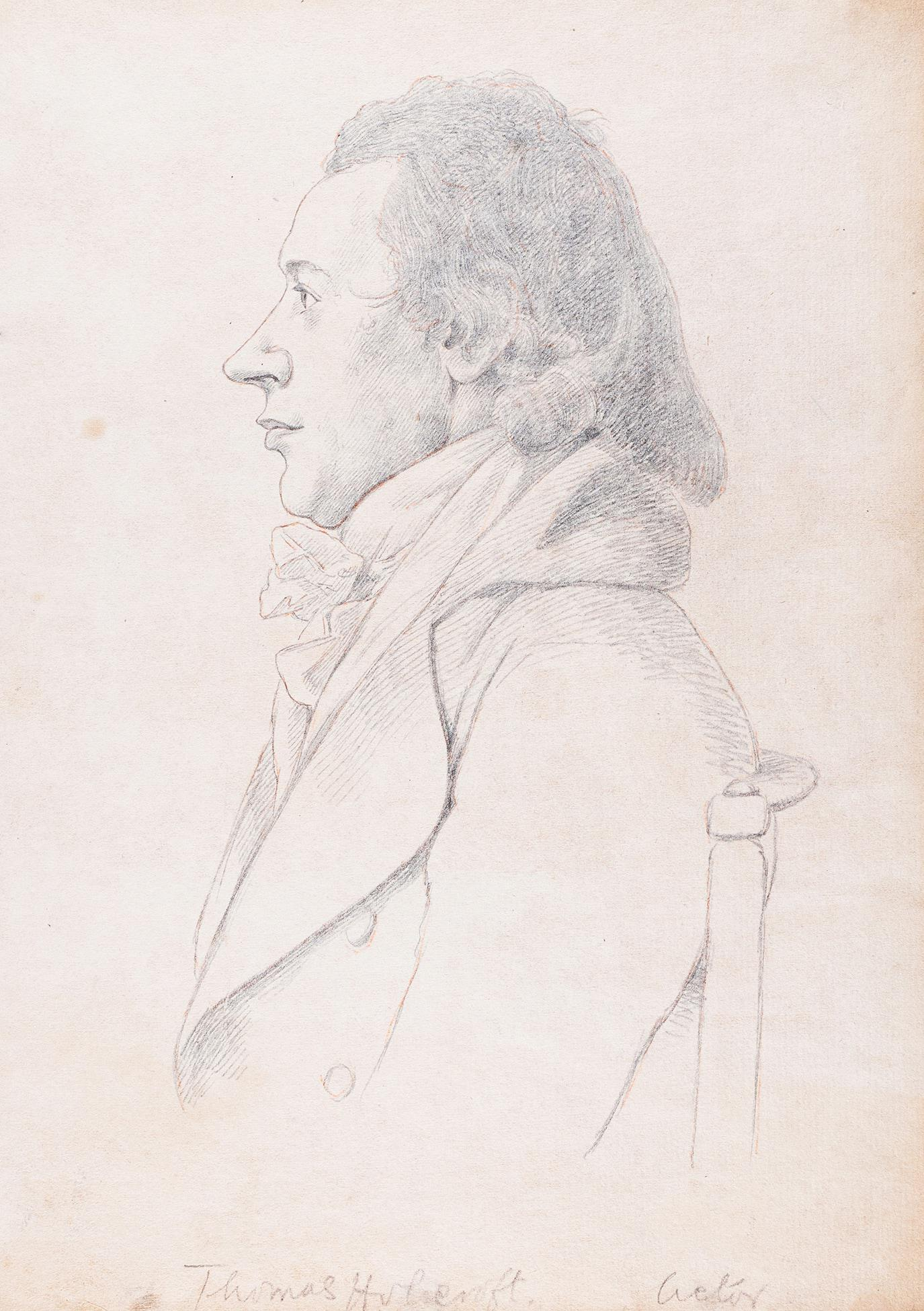
'Thomas Holcroft' - William Daniell after George Dance the Younger, chalk and pencil drawing

Thomas Holcroft married four times.

From his first wife, whom he married around 1765 and whose name is unknown, he had a daughter Ann (1766–1841), who in 1797 married Colonel William Tooke Harwood (1757–1824), a close associate of John Horne Tooke (1736–1812) and a fervent follower of Joanna Southcott (1750–1814).

In 1772 Holcroft married Matilda Tipler from Nottingham and had with her two children: a son William (1773–1789), who being only sixteen, committed suicide while attempting to escape to the West Indies after robbing his father of £40 (Memoirs, pp. 140–142), and a daughter Sophia (1775–1850), who in 1794 married William Cole, a merchant from Exeter. She resided later at Hamburg, and in 1805, after Cole's death, was married to Georges Danton's cousin Georges Nicholas Mergez (1772–1846), a general in the Napoleonic army.

In 1778, three years after the death of his second wife, Holcroft married Diana Robinson, who died in 1780 after giving birth to a daughter Fanny Margaretta (1780–1844). Fanny Holcroft was the author of the noted Romantic anti-slavery poem, "The Negro" (1797), as well as novels such as Fortitude and Frailty (1817) and The Wife and the Lover (1813–14). From 1805 to 1806, she also translated seven plays (from German, Italian, and Spanish) for her father's "Theatrical Recorder" and later wrote a melodrama of her own.

After nine years as a widower, Holcroft married his fourth wife, Louisa Mercier (1779–1853), in March 1799. She was the daughter of a longstanding friend, Charles-André Mercier, brother of the French dramatist Louis-Sébastien Mercier (1740–1814). From this marriage came four sons and two daughters. The daughter Louisa (1801–1869) became the wife of Carlyle's friend John Badams (Carlyle, Reminiscences, ed. C. E. Norton, 1887, i., pp. 93–95) in 1828; after Badam's death (1833), she in 1835 married Barham Cole Mergez, her half-sister's Sophia son from her second marriage who in 1846 inherited the title "baron" from his father. The son Thomas Holcroft Jr. (1803–1852) was a clerk in the House of Commons and spent several years in India, before becoming a journalist in 1822, who some time was Paris correspondent for the Morning Herald and secretary of the Asiatic Society. The widowed Louisa Mercier Holcroft remarried James Kenney (1780–1849), the dramatist, in 1812 and became the mother of three sons and three daughters.

== Selected plays ==
- Duplicity (1781)
- Seduction (1787)
- The German Hotel (1790)
- The School for Arrogance (1791)
- The Road to Ruin (1792)
- Love's Frailties (1794)
- The Deserted Daughter (1795)
- The Force of Ridicule (1796)
- The Man of Ten Thousand (1796)
- The Inquisitor (1797)
- He's Much to Blame (1798)
- Knave or Not? (1798)
- Hear Both Sides (1803)
- The Vindictive Man (1806)
