= Richard "Dicky" Suett =

English comedian

Richard Suett
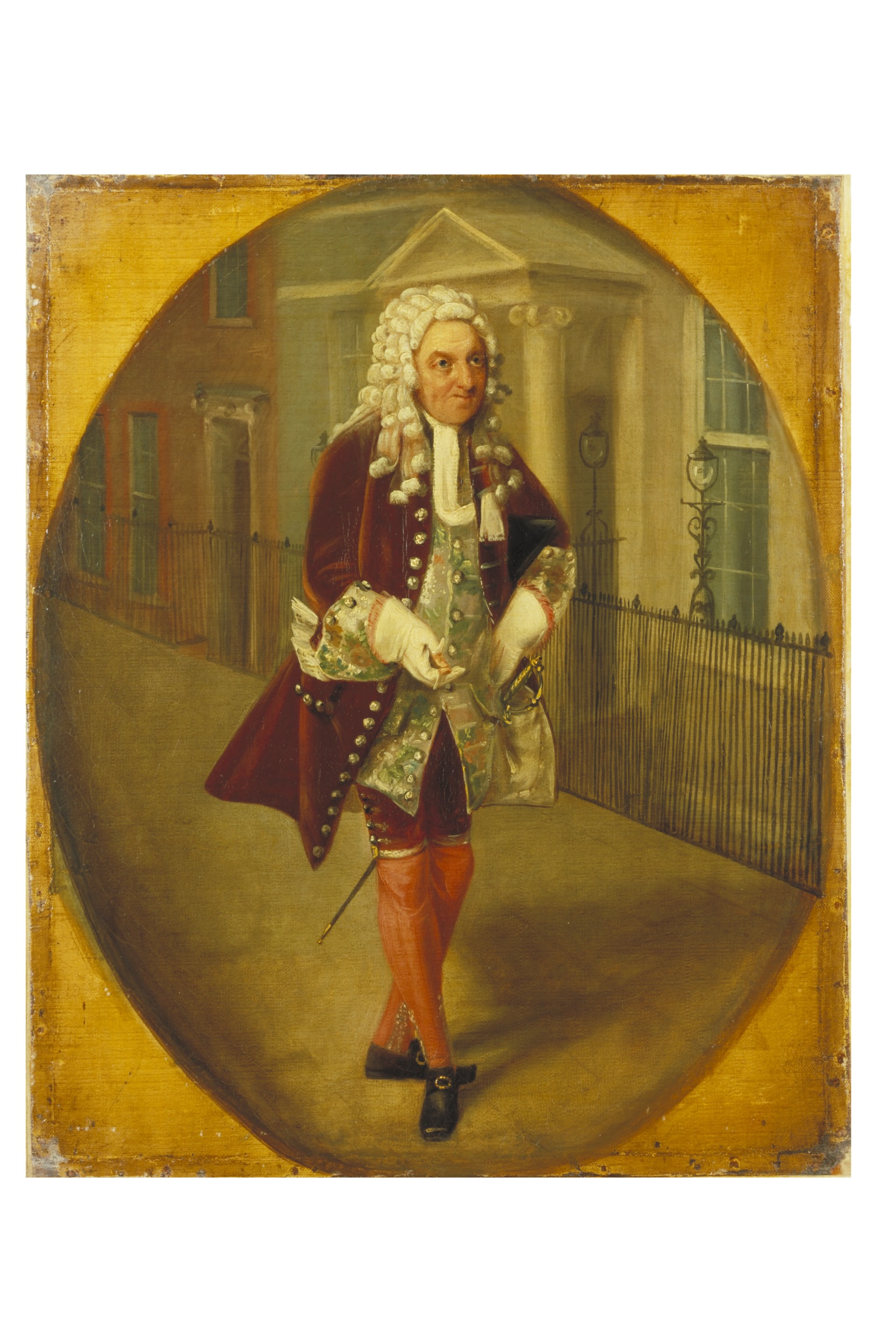
- Born: 1755; London, England, Great Britain
- Died: 6 July 1805 (aged 49–50)
- Other name: Dicky
- Occupations: Actor, comedian

Richard Suett (1755 – 6 July 1805) was an English comedian who was George III's favourite Shakespearean clown, and star at the Theatre Royal, Drury Lane for twenty-five years.

== Early life ==
Suett was born in Chelsea in 1755, and at ten years of age entered the choir at Westminster Abbey as a pupil of Benjamin Cooke. In 1769, he sang at the Ranelagh Gardens, the Grotto Garden, and at Marylebone Gardens, and was in May 1770 employed by Foote at the Haymarket in some juvenile and unnoted parts. On 24 July 1771 at that house Master Suett was the original Cupid in 'Dido,' a comic opera assigned to Thomas Bridges. Charles Bannister then obtained for him an engagement on the York circuit with Tate Wilkinson, with whom he remained as singer and second low comedian for nine years, at the largest salary Wilkinson ever paid. His first appearance was made on 22 November 1771 in Hull, where he sang a once favourite song, 'Chloe's my myrtle and Jenny's my rose.' Wilkinson thought highly of him, calling him his pupil, speaking of him as about the age of 17, known only from having sung one season at Ranelagh, and pronounced him the possessor of 'a most unpromising pair of legs.' Suett proved 'of real importance' to Wilkinson; at the close of this engagement a further engagement for two years, with a penalty of £100 for forfeiture, was drawn up. On finding, however, that Suett had handsome offers from Linley for Drury Lane, Wilkinson generously destroyed the bond.

== At Drury Lane ==
Suett's first appearance at Drury Lane took place in October 1780 as Ralph in the 'Maid of the Well.' On 27 December he created a most favourable impression as the original Moll Flagon in Burgoyne's 'Lord of the Manor.' On 9 March 1781 he was the first Metaphor in Andrews's 'Dissipation,' and he was seen during the season as Tipple in Bates's 'Flitch of Bacon.' In Jackman's farce 'Divorce,' 10 November, he was the original Tom; on 13 December the original Piano in Tickell's successful opera, the 'Carnival of Venice;' and on 18 May 1782 the original Carbine in Pilon's 'Fair American.' He also played Squire Richard in The Provoked Husband, Waitwell in the 'Way of the World,' and Hobbinol in the 'Capricious Lovers.' From the records of 1782–3 his name is absent. On 14 November 1783 it reappeared to Marrall in 'A New Way to pay Old Debts.' Suett also played the Puritan in 'Duke and no Duke,' and Grizzle in 'Tom Thumb,' with one or two insignificant original parts in no less insignificant operas, for which his voice, impaired by dissipation, gradually unfitted him. To 1784–5 belong Filch in 'The Beggar's Opera,' Lord Froth in the 'Double Dealer,' Binnacle in the 'Fair Quaker,' Clown in 'Winter's Tale,' and Sir Wilful Witwould in the 'Way of the World.' He was also the original Sir Ephraim Rupee in T. Dibdin's 'Liberty Hall' on 8 February 1785. To the following seasons are assigned the Clown in 'Twelfth Night,' and Blister in the 'Virgin Unmasked.' Many similar parts were assigned him, including Robin in the 'Waterman,' Dumps in the 'Natural Son,' Lord Plausible in the 'Plain Dealer,' Snip in 'Harlequin's Invasion,' Allscrap in the 'Heiress,' Trappanti, Mungo, First Gravedigger, Gibbet in the 'Beaux' Stratagem,' Diggory in 'All the World's a Stage,' Colonel Oldboy in the 'School for Fathers,' Obediah in the 'Committee,' Moneytrap in The Confederacy Launcelot Gobbo, Doctor Bilioso (an original part) in Cobb's 'Doctor and Apothecary,' 25 October 1788, Gardiner in 'King Henry VIII,' Oliver (an original part) in Cumberland's 'Impostors,' 26 January 1789, Bartholo in 'Follies of a Day,' Muckworm in 'Honest Yorkshireman,' Touchstone, Pistol in 'King Henry V,' Booze in 'Belphegor,' Solomon in the 'Quaker,' Thurio in 'Two Gentlemen of Verona,' Old Hardcastle, and Mawworm. He was on 16 April 1790 the original Endless in 'No Song no Supper,' and on 1 January 1791 the original Yuseph in Cobb's 'The Siege of Belgrade'.

== Later career ==
When Drury Lane was demolished, Suett in 1791–2 accompanied the company to the Haymarket Opera-house, where during two seasons he played many insignificant original parts, besides appearing as Sancho in 'Love makes a Man,' Tipkin in the 'Tender Husband,' Thrifty in The Cheats of Scapin, Old Gobbo, Foresight in 'Love for Love,' Sir Felix Friendly in the 'Agreeable Surprise,' and Label (an original part) in Hoare's 'Prize' on 11 March 1793. On 29 June he made, as the original Whimmy in O'Keeffe's The London Hermit, his first traceable appearance at the little house in the Haymarket. A winter season at the same house under Colman followed, and Suett, besides playing Obediah Prim and Bullock, was on 1 October 1793 the first Apathy in Morton's 'Children in the Wood,' and on 16 December the first Dicky Gossip, a barber, in Hoare's 'My Grandmother.' On the reopening of Drury Lane in the spring of 1794 Suett played a Witch in 'Macbeth,' and was on 8 May 1794 the original Jabal, a part in which he scored highly, in Cumberland's 'Jew.' In Kemble's 'Lodoiska,' on 9 June, he was the first Varbel.

Suett remained at Drury Lane until his death, although he appeared each summer down to 1803 at the Haymarket.

== Roles and reputation ==
His parts were mainly confined to Shakespearean clowns and other characters principally belonging to low comedy. Some few might perhaps be put in another category. The Shakespearean parts assigned him included Clown in 'Measure for Measure,' Polonius, Peter in 'Romeo and Juliet,' Dogberry, Trinculo, Sir Andrew Aguecheek, and Shallow in the 'Merry Wives of Windsor.' Other roles of interest were Don Pedro in the 'Wonder,' Don Jerome in the 'Duenna,' Crabtree, Antonio in 'Follies of a Day,' Silky in 'The Road to Ruin,' Don Manuel in She Would and She Would Not and Sir Robert Bramble in The Poor Gentleman Out of many original parts taken between 1794 and 1805 the following deserve record: Robin Gray in Arnold's ‘Auld Robin Gray,’ Haymarket, 29 July 1794; Weazel in Cumberland's ‘Wheel of Fortune,’ Drury Lane, 28 February 1795; Fustian in the younger Colman's ‘New Hay at the Old Market,’ Haymarket, 9 June 1795. In the famous production at Drury Lane of Colman's ‘Iron Chest,’ 12 March 1796, Suett was Samson. In the ‘Will’ by Reynolds, 19 April 1797, he was Realize. His great original part of Daniel Dowlas, alias Lord Duberly, in The Heir at Law, was played at the Haymarket on 15 July 1797. On 24 May 1799 at Drury Lane he played Diego, a short comic part, on the first appearance of Sheridan's Pizarro, and nearly damned the piece; the part was promptly cancelled. On 1 February 1800 Suett was, at Drury Lane, the first Baron Piffleberg in ‘Of Age to-morrow,’ adapted from Kotzebue by T. Dibdin; on 15 July, at the Haymarket, the first Steinberg in C. Kemble's ‘Point of Honour;’ and on 2 September the first Deputy Bull in the ‘Review’ of Arthur Griffenhoof (George Colman the younger). On 24 February 1801, at Drury Lane, he was the original Dominique in Holcroft's adaptation ‘Deaf and Dumb.’ On 10 June 1805 he played at Drury Lane Lampedo in the ‘Honeymoon,’ the last part in which his name can be traced. He died on 6 July at a small public-house in Denzell Street, Clare Market, and was buried in St. Paul's churchyard, on the north side. A son, Theophilus Suett, was a good musician, and was cast for Samson in ‘The Iron Chest’ at Covent Garden on 23 April 1799. The part, however, was taken by his father, who appears to have made on that occasion his only appearance at that house.

Suett followed in the wake of William Parsons (1736–1795). A story is told that Parsons, being unwell, could not play his part of Alderman Uniform in Miles Peter Andrews's 'Dissipation,' which had been commanded by the king. On being told of this fact, George III said that Suett would be able to play it. This Suett did with so much success that he became the 'understudy' of Parsons, whose delicate health furnished him with many opportunities. Suett was not accepted as the equal of Parsons. In a like fashion Charles Mathews, who succeeded Suett, was held his inferior. Suett, however, was not difficult to imitate, and Mathews frequently caught his tone. Among Suett's best parts were Moll Flagon, Tipple, Apathy, Dicky Gossip, the drunken Porter in 'Feudal Times,' and Weazel in Cumberland's 'Wheel of Fortune.' The last was much admired by Kemble, who, discussing Suett's death, said to Kelly: ‘Penruddock has lost a powerful ally in Suett; I have acted the part with many Weazels, and good ones too, but none of them could work up my passions to the pitch Suett did; he had a comical, impertinent way of thrusting his head into my face, which called forth all my irritable sensations’ (Genest, vii. 654). Suett depended a good deal upon make-up, at which he was an adept. He was given to distorting his features, and saying more than was allotted him. William Hazlitt called him 'the delightful old croaker, the everlasting Dicky Gossip of the stage.' O'Keeffe declared that he was 'the most natural actor of his time,' and Leigh Hunt speaks of him as 'the very personification of weak whimsicality, with a laugh like a peal of giggles.' It is, however, on the praise of Lamb that Suett's reputation rests. Lamb declares him 'the Robin Goodfellow of the stage. He came into trouble all things with a welcome perplexity, himself no whit troubled for the matter. He was known, like Puck, by his note, "Ha! ha! ha!" sometimes deepening to "Ho! ho! ho!" … Thousands of hearts yet respond to the chuckling O La! of Dickey Suett … He drolled upon the stock of these two syllables richer than the cuckoo … Shakespeare foresaw him when he framed his fools and jesters. They have all the true Suett stamp, a loose and shambling gait, a slippery tongue, this last the ready midwife to a without-pain delivered jest, in words light as air, venting truths deep as the centre, with idlest rhymes tagging conceit when busiest, singing with Lear in "The Tempest," or Sir Toby at the buttery-hatch.'

Suett, who lived latterly at Chelsea, was fond of low company, and used to spend much time in public-houses. He was a good singer and story-teller in social circles. His breakfast-table was always garnished with bottles of rum and brandy, and he frequently used, it is said, to qualify himself for his work on the stage by getting drunk. Stories told concerning Suett's wit are not convincing. He played, however, with some humour upon his own follies and vices.

== Portraits ==
The Mathews collection of pictures in the Garrick Club has three portraits of Suett by Dewilde—one in ordinary dress, a second as Endless in 'No Song no Supper,' and a third as Fustian in 'Sylvester Dangerwood' to the Dangerwood of Bannister. A portrait by Dewilde, engraved by Cawthorne, is in the National Art Library, South Kensington.

== Notes and references ==
- Genest's Account of the English Stage
- Gilliland's Dramatic Mirror
- Oxberry's Dramatic Biography
- Monthly Mirror, various years
- Georgian Era;
- Kelly's Reminiscences
- O'Keeffe's Recollections
- Lamb's Essays
- Leigh Hunt's Dramatic Essays
- Hazlitt's Dramatic Essays
- Clark Russell's Representative Actors
- Marshall's Catalogue of Engraved National Portraits
- Doran's Annals of the Stage, ed. Low
- Thespian Dictionary
- Tate Wilkinson's Wandering Patentee
- Mathews's Table Talk

Attribution

This article incorporates text from a publication now in the public domain: Lee, Sidney, ed. (1898). "Suett, Richard". Dictionary of National Biography. Vol. 55. London: Smith, Elder & Co.
