= Leather Bottle, Earlsfield =

Pub in Earlsfield, London

Coordinates: 51.436843°N 0.187270°W

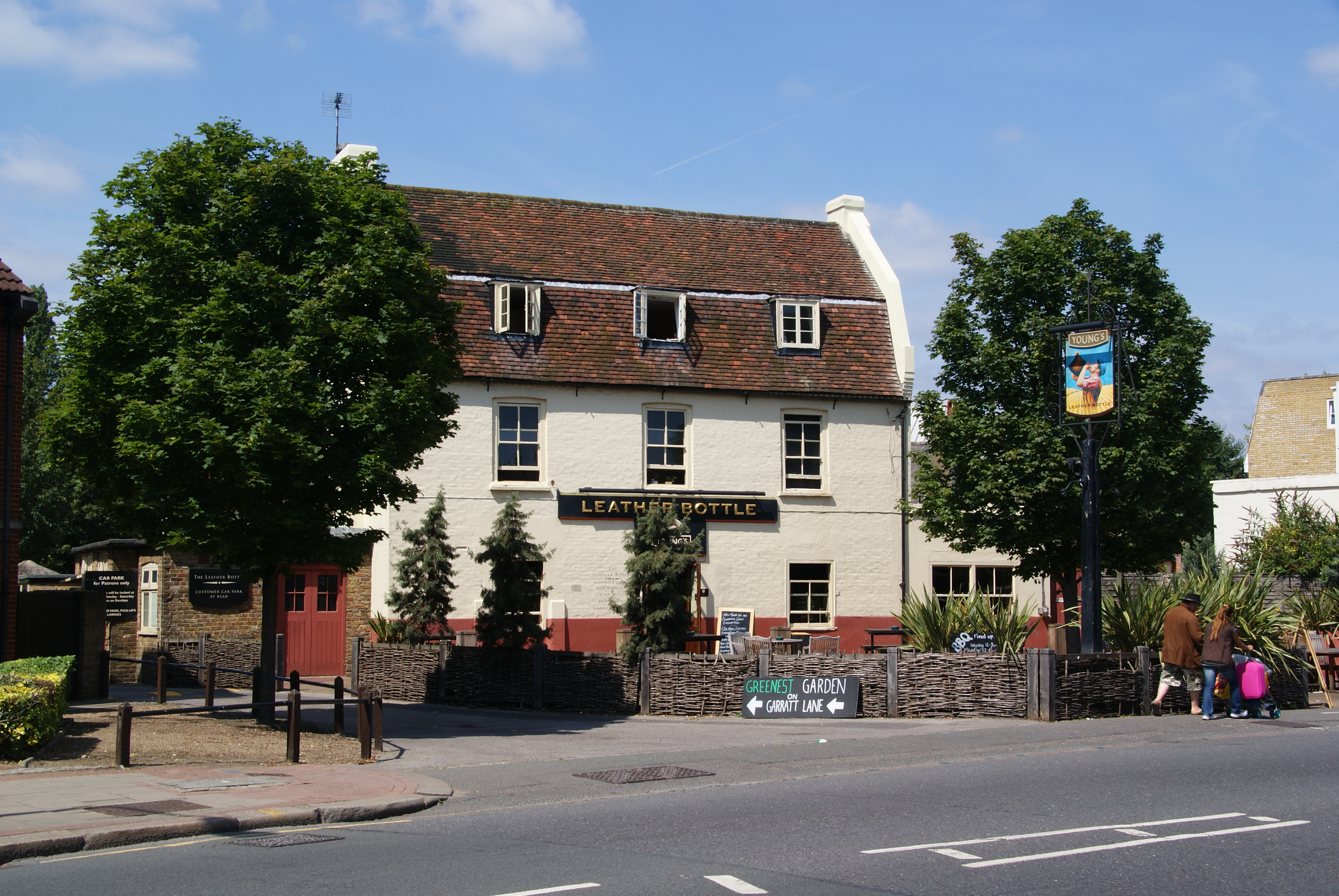
The Leather Bottle, Earlsfield

The Leather Bottle is a pub at 538 Garratt Lane, Earlsfield, London SW17.

It is a Grade II listed building, built in the early 18th century. The introduction to Samuel Foote's play The Mayor of Garratt mentions the pub, describing Earlsfield's mock Garrat Elections of the 18th century as having been founded by "a party of watermen, belonging to Wandsworth, dining at the Leather Bottle". It is currently operated by Young's.
