= Altab Ali Park =

Small park in London, England

Coordinates: 51.5162°N 0.0685°W

Altab Ali park
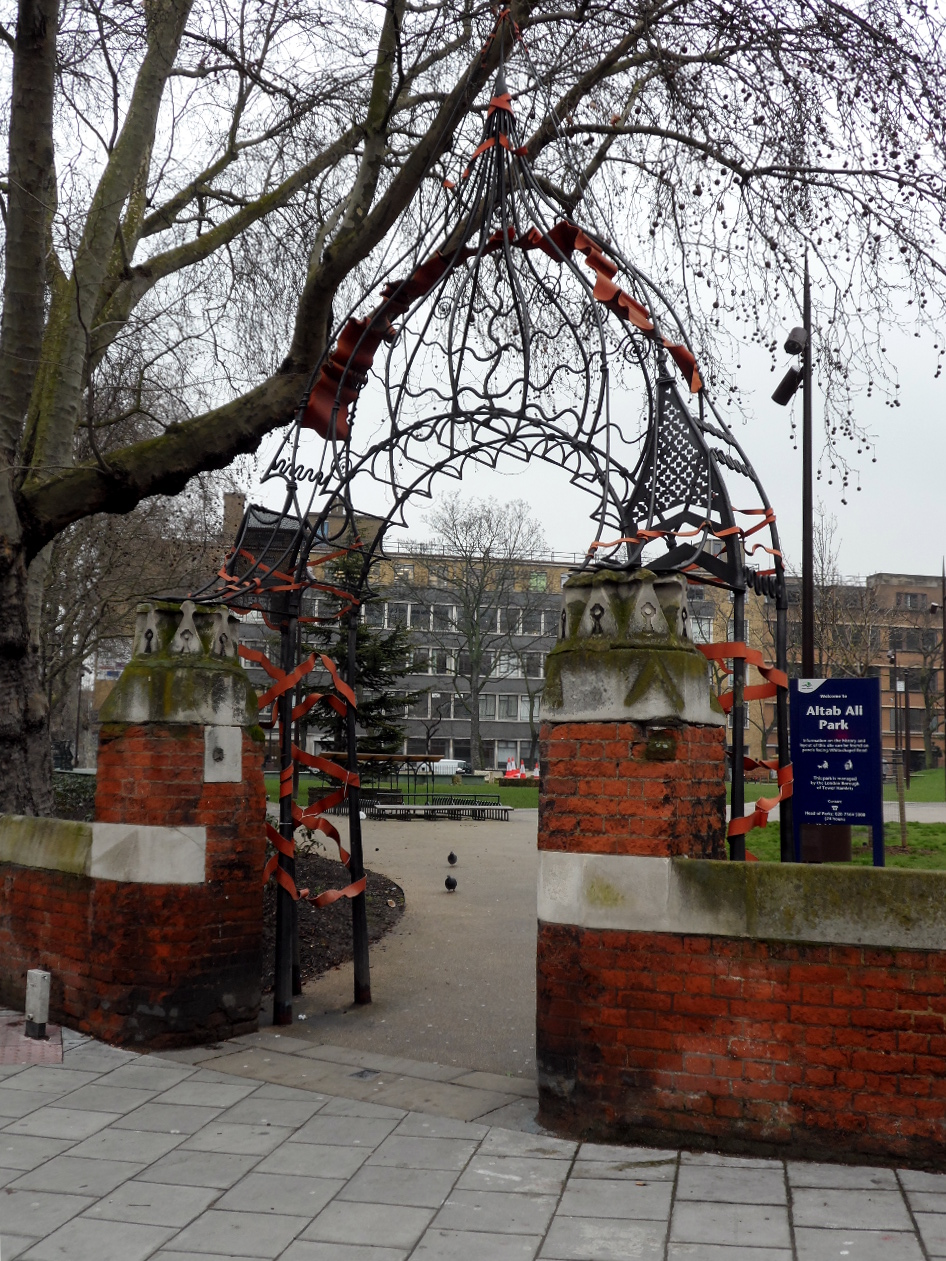
- Entrance to the park

- Location within the United Kingdom
- Type: Urban park
- Location: Whitechapel, United Kingdom
- Operator: Tower Hamlets
- Open: All year

Altab Ali Park is a small park on the Whitechapel Road, in Whitechapel, London. Formerly known as St Mary's Park, it is the site of the old 14th-century, once whitewashed church, St Mary Matfelon, from which Whitechapel gets its name.

St Mary's was badly damaged by enemy action in 1940, during The Blitz, and subsequently demolished. Little remains of the old church, other than the floor plan and some graves. Those buried in former churchyard include Richard Parker, Richard Brandon, Sir John Cass, and "Sir" Jeffrey Dunstan, "Mayor of Garratt".

The park was renamed Altab Ali Park in 1998 in memory of Altab Ali, a 24-year-old British Bangladeshi leather clothing worker, who was murdered on 4 May 1978, in the adjacent Adler Street, by three teenage boys as he walked home from work. Ali's murder was one of the many racist attacks that occurred in the area at that time. At the entrance to the park is an arch created by David Petersen, developed as a memorial to Altab Ali and other victims of racist attacks. The arch incorporates a complex Bengali and European style pattern, meant to show the merging of different cultures in East London.

Along the path down the centre of the park were letters spelling out "The shade of my tree is offered to those who come and go fleetingly", a fragment of a poem by Bengali poet Rabindranath Tagore. They were removed during landscaping in 2011.

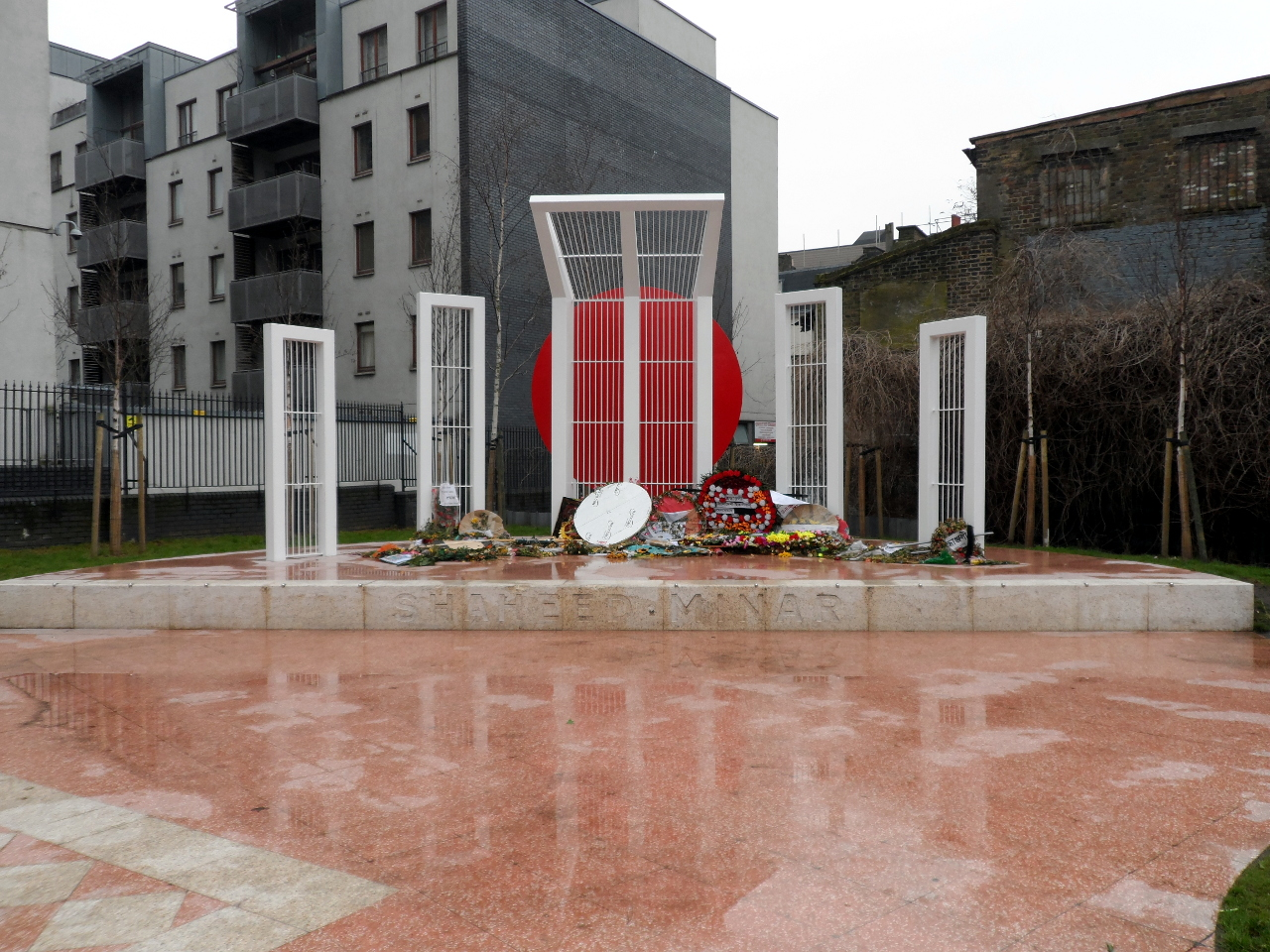
Replica of the Shaheed Minar monument

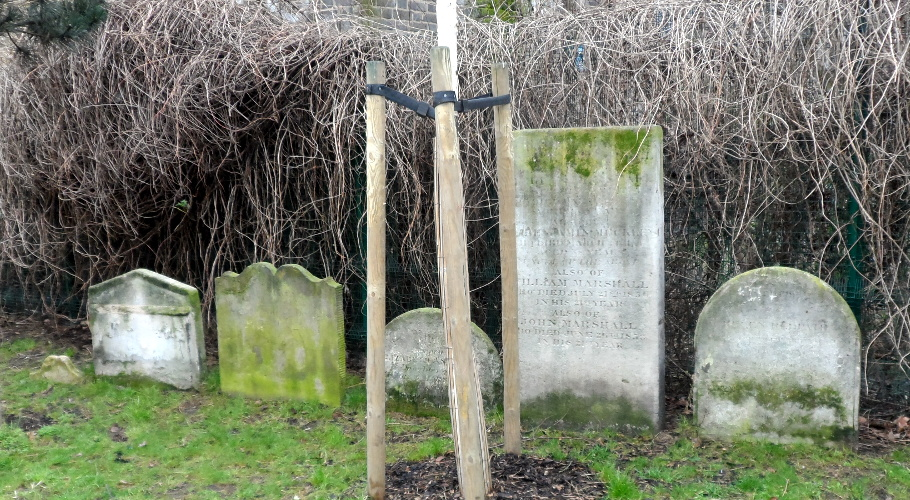
Gravestones

The Shaheed Minar, which commemorates the Bengali language movement, stands in the southwest corner of Altab Ali Park. The monument is a smaller replica of the one in Dhaka, Bangladesh, and symbolises a mother and her martyred sons. It was unveiled by the Speaker of the Bangladesh National Parliament, Humayun Rashid Choudhury, in February 1999.

The nearest London Underground station is Aldgate East on the District and Hammersmith & City lines.
