= Waggle =

Waggle may refer to:

- Waggle (video gaming), a pejorative term for a player's movement of their video game controller
- Waggle dance, a term used for a particular figure-eight dance of the honey bee
- Waggle Dance beer, a brand produced by Wells & Young's Brewery

== See also ==
- Bootleg play, also known as waggle play, a tactic in American football
