= Samuel Thomas Russell =

English actor and stage manager

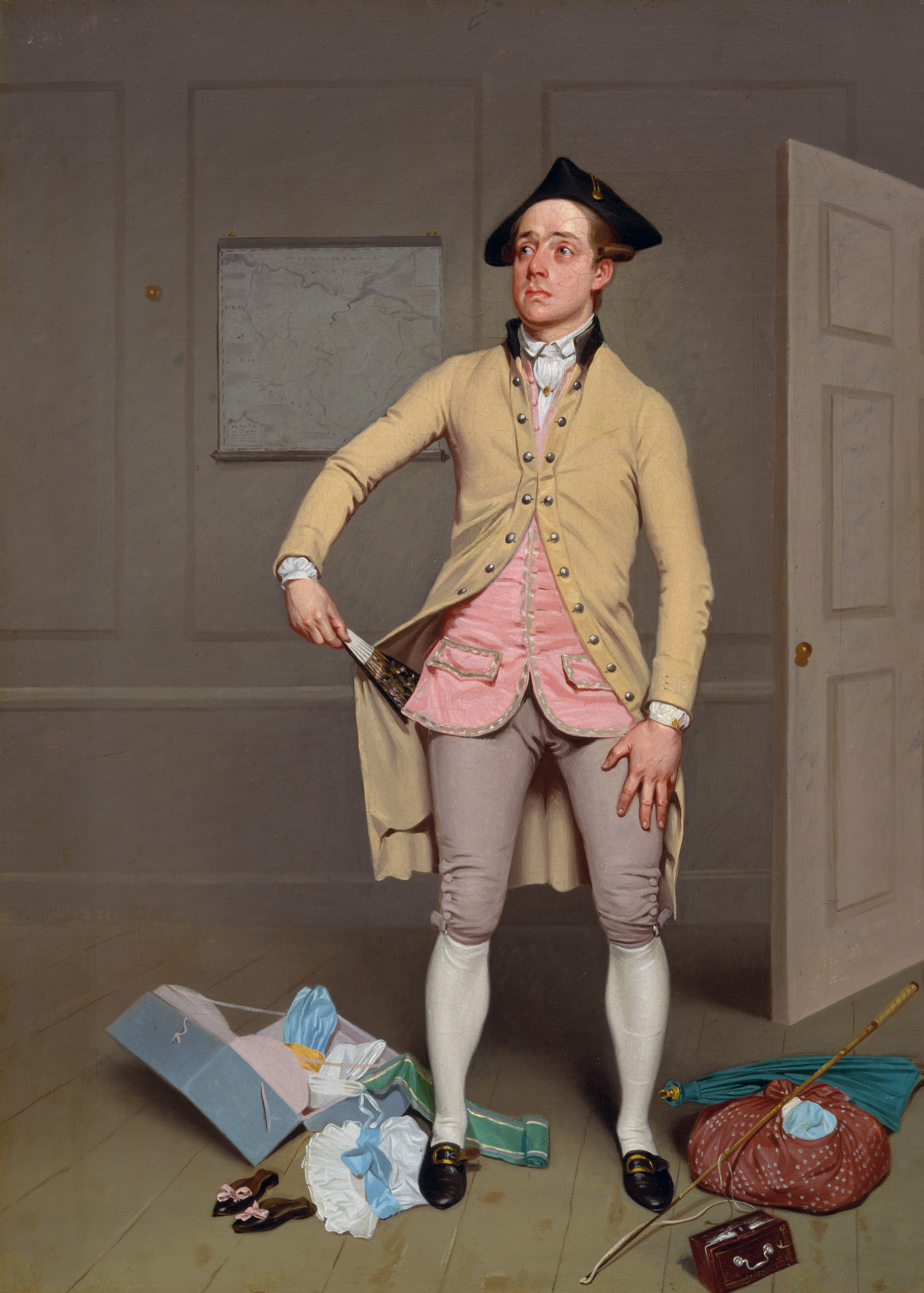
Russell as Jerry Sneak in The Mayor of Garratt. Painting by Samuel De Wilde.

Samuel Thomas Russell (1766 – 25 February 1845) was an English actor and stage manager. He appeared many times at Drury Lane and at the Haymarket. His most famous role was Jerry Sneak in The Mayor of Garratt.

== Life ==
Russell, the son of Samuel Russell, a country actor, was born in London. As a child he acted juvenile parts in the country, and in 1782 at the "Royal Circus and Equestrian Philharmonic", opened by Charles Dibdin and Charles Hughes on the spot subsequently occupied by the Surrey Theatre. He was one of the youthful performers, and, it is reported, spoke an opening address.

About 1790 he was playing leading business with a "sharing company" at Eastbourne. In Dover in 1791 he married Ann Mate, whose father was a printer, actor and manager and proprietor of the theatre. At Margate, where he acted, his father was a member of the company, and was famous for his Jerry Sneak in Samuel Foote's The Mayor of Garratt, the traditions of which he had inherited from Thomas Weston, the original exponent. The attention of the Prince of Wales was drawn by Captain Charles Morris in 1795 to this impersonation. On the recommendation of the prince, Russell's father was engaged for Drury Lane. The son, however, was, through a trick, as is said, engaged instead.

=== Engagement at Drury Lane ===
Russell appeared accordingly at Drury Lane, in September 1795, as Charles Surface in Sheridan's The School for Scandal and Fribble in David Garrick's Miss in Her Teens. The performance is unchronicled by John Genest, whose first mention of Russell is on 6 October as Humphrey Grizzle in Prince Hoare's Three and the Deuce. Though disapproving of Russell's Charles Surface, the prince commended his Fribble. Russell made a success, in May 1796, in an original part unnamed in an anonymous farce called Alive and Merry, unprinted. On 2 June he took, jointly with Robert Palmer, a benefit performance. The pieces were Hamlet and Follies of a Day; what Russell played is unknown. These were his only recorded appearances at this time. During the summer months he took the Richmond Theatre, at which he played leading business, and he also acted as a star in the country.

In April 1797 he was, at Drury Lane, the first Robert in Frederick Reynolds's The Will. He also played Valentia in Elizabeth Inchbald's The Child of Nature. Tattle in William Congreve's Love for Love was assigned him in November, and in June 1798 he was the original Jeremy Jumps in John O'Keeffe's unprinted Nosegay of Weeds, or Old Servants in New Places. Lord Trinket in George Colman's The Jealous Wife and Saville in Thomas King's Will and no Will were given the following season, and he was, in May 1799, the original Sir Charles Careless in First Faults, by Maria Theresa Kemble.

=== Stage manager ===
In 1812 Russell was stage manager at the Surrey under Robert William Elliston, and he was subsequently stage manager at the Olympic Theatre, playing "all lines from Jerry Sneak and Peter Pastoral to Rover and Joseph Surface". From 1814 to 1818 he appeared in several plays at the Haymarket, including George Farquhar's The Beaux' Stratagem, as Archer.

In the autumn of 1819 he was appointed by Elliston stage manager at Drury Lane, and appeared there in several plays, notably in February 1820 as Leopold in The Siege of Belgrade for the first appearance of Madame Vestris on the English stage.

=== Later years ===
From this time his name, never frequent in the London bills, disappears from them. During eight or ten years he managed the Brighton Theatre. In 1837 and 1838 he was stage manager at the Haymarket, and in the latter year became, under Alfred Bunn, stage manager for a second period at Drury Lane. In 1840 he played at Her Majesty's Theatre his great part of Jerry Sneak to William Dowton's Major Sturgeon. At the Haymarket he took a benefit in 1842. Russell was supposed to be a well-to-do man. The proceeds of his benefit were, however, misused by a dishonest broker, and he was reduced to poverty. He died at Gravesend, in the house of a daughter, on 25 February 1845. He was twice married, and left three daughters.
