= Spotted Horse, Putney =

Pub in London

Coordinates: 51.4626502°N 0.2185847°W

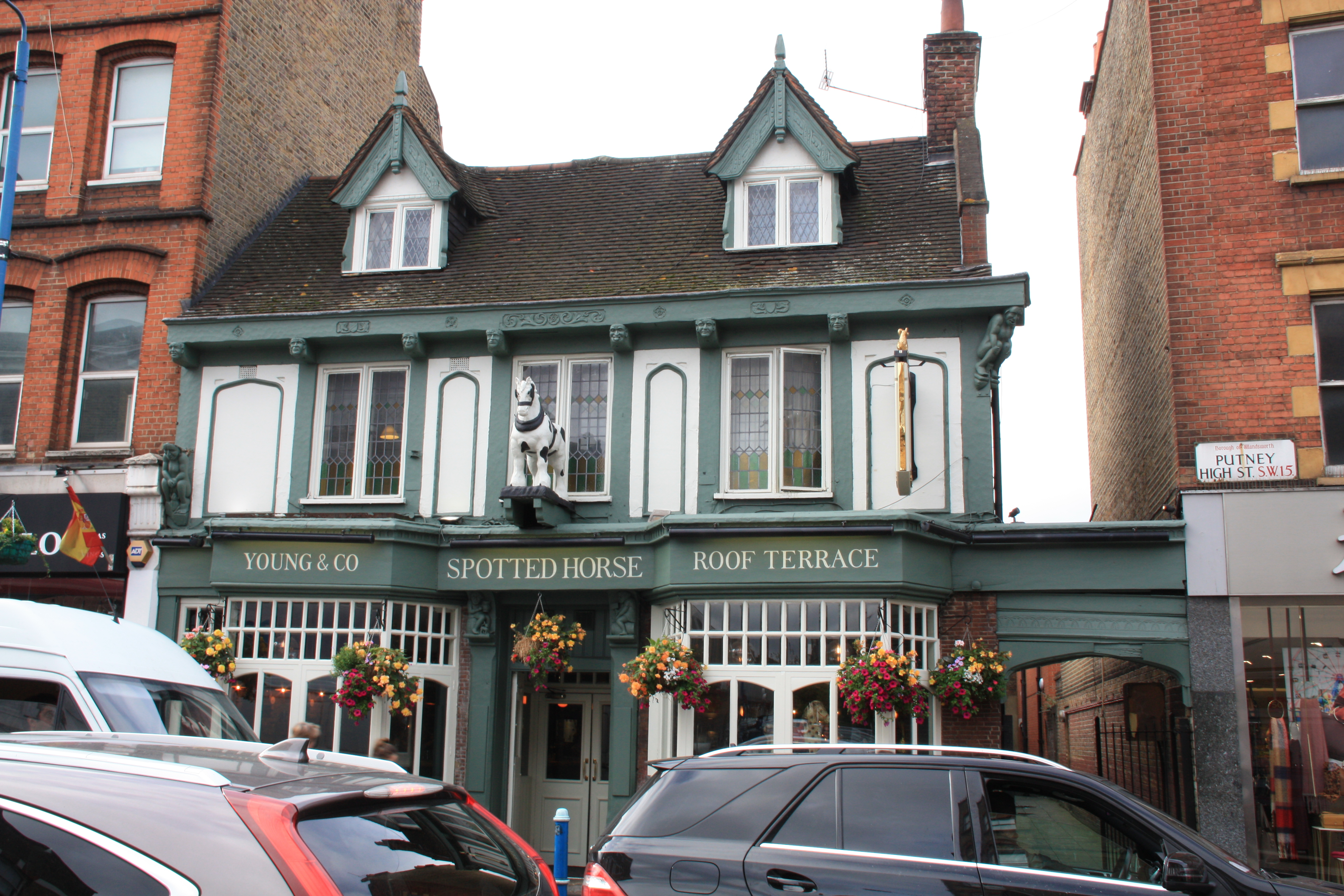
- Spotted Horse frontage, Putney High Street

Restaurant information
- Food type: Pub
- Location: Putney, London Borough of Wandsworth, UK

The Spotted Horse is an historic pub in Putney, in the London Borough of Wandsworth.

== History ==
The pub opened in the 18th century and was one of Young's founding pubs. It has an open fire and was remodelled in Edwardian period and in the early 2000s, with a piebald horse model over its entrance, but this is not seen in image of the pub in the 1920s. In the 2010s a roof bar was added with further refurbishment, it was a finalist in the 2018 Casual Dining Awards for ‘Best Designed Pub/Bar of the year".

The pub was a clandestine meeting place for Klaus Fuchs and his Soviet handler, Aleksandr Feklisov, in 1949.

== Management ==
The pub is managed by Young & Co and used to have beer delivered from the Ram Brewery in Wandsworth by shire horse.
