= Samuel De Wilde =

English painter

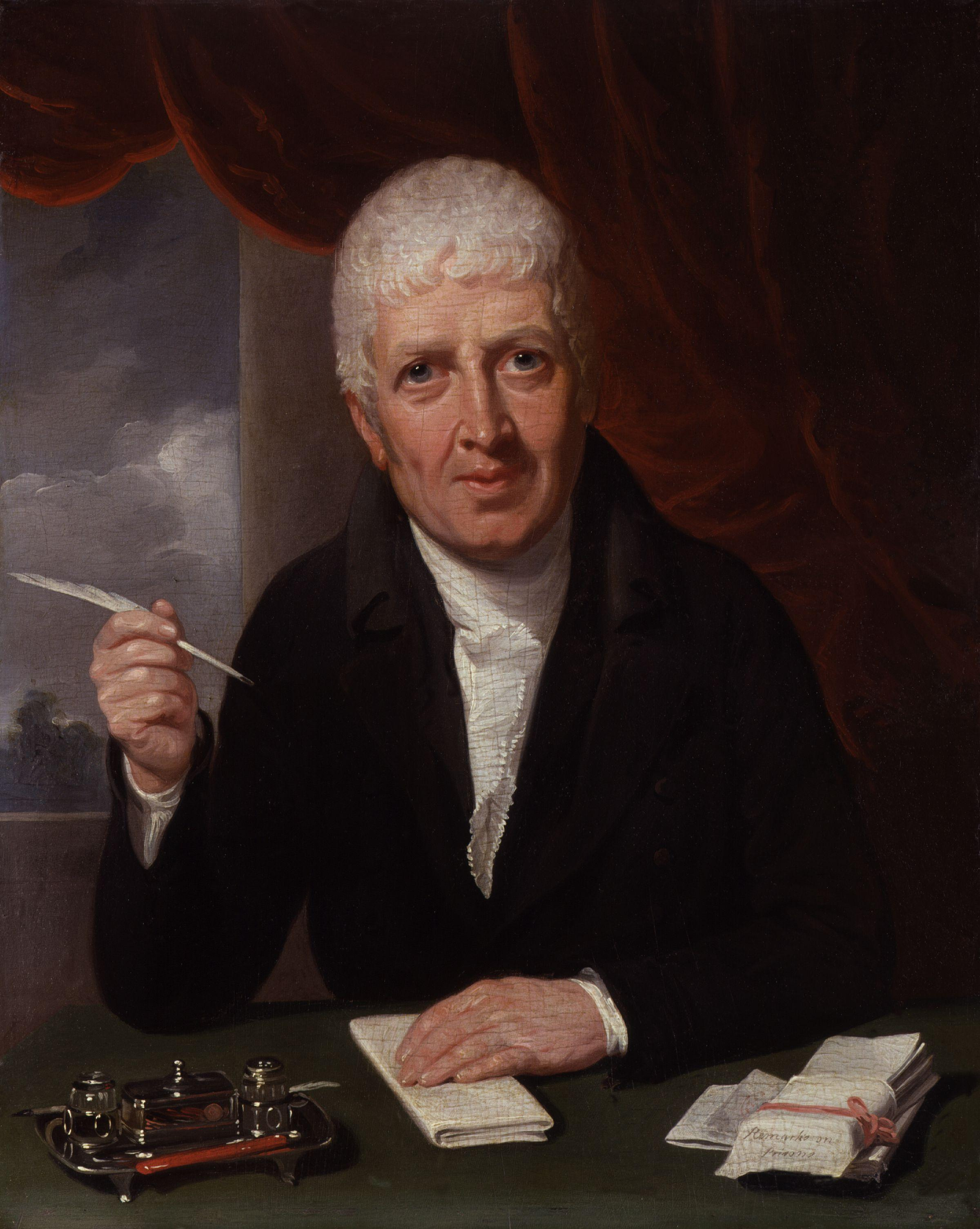
James Neild (Samuel De Wilde)

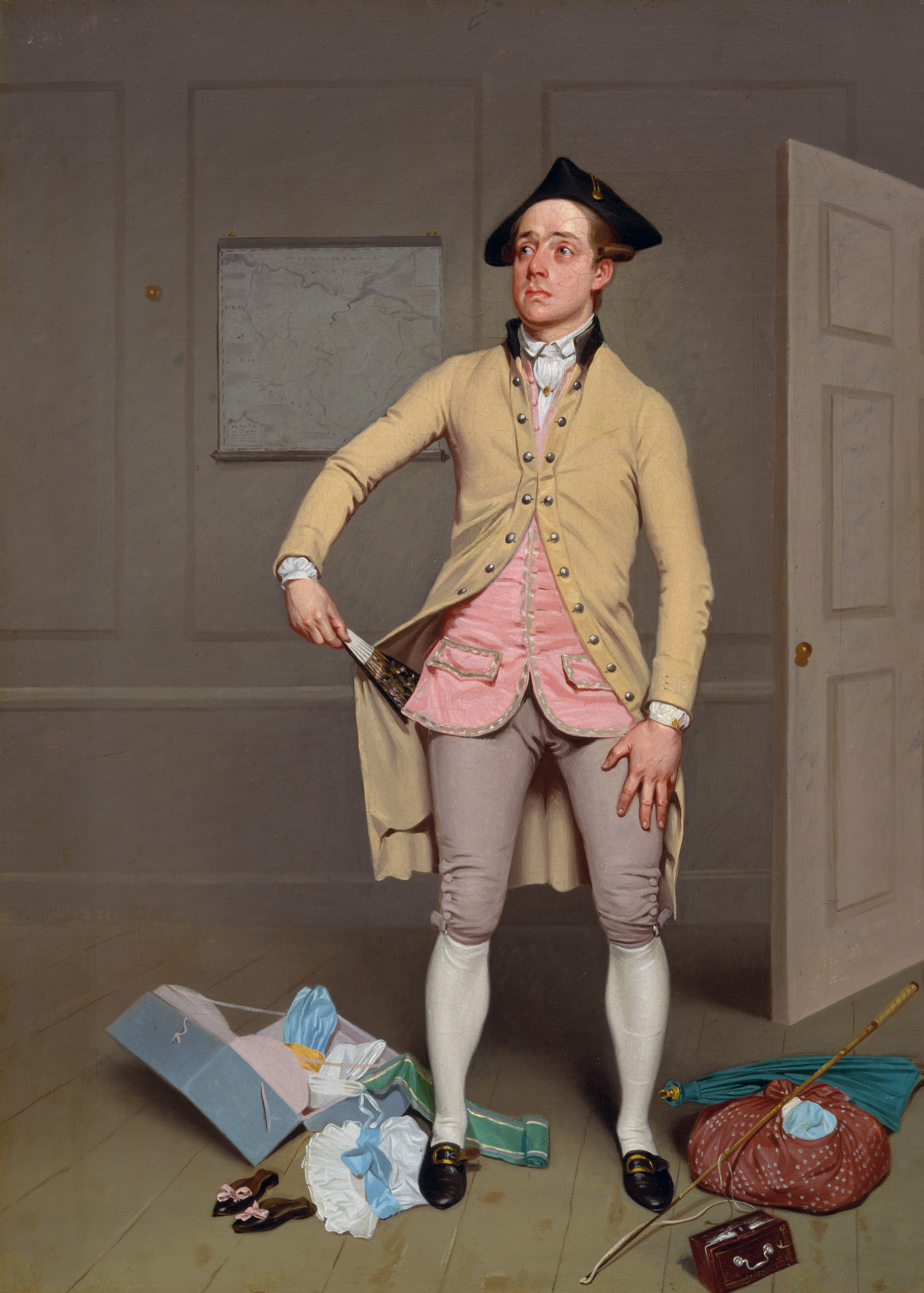
Samuel Thomas Russell (1766–1845) as Jerry Sneak in The Mayor of Garratt, a play by Samuel Foote (Samuel De Wilde, 1810)

Samuel De Wilde (1751 – 19 January 1832), born and died in London, was a portrait painter and etcher of Dutch descent famous for his theatrical paintings. He was the leading painter of actors and actresses between 1770 and 1820. He lived in Clarendon Square, Somers Town.

De Wilde was baptised in London on 28 July 1751, the son of a Dutch joiner who had settled there by 1748. He was apprenticed to his godfather, Samuel Haworth, a joiner in London, but left after five years and enrolled at the Royal Academy Schools from 1769. He exhibited small portraits at the Society of Artists (1776–1778) and at the Royal Academy (from 1778). His career in theatrical portraiture began when he was employed by John Bell as portraitist for his publication British Theatre, a series that ran from 1791 until 1795. He became well known for his theatrical portraiture, which he exhibited at the Royal Academy from 1792 until 1821. At his studio in Drury Lane many actors and actresses came to sit for him and his theatrical portraits appeared in numerous publications, including the Monthly Mirror, John Cawthorn's Minor British Theatre and William Oxberry's New English Drama. The bulk of his work is in pencil or watercolour.
