= Garratt Lane =

Street in London

Coordinates: 51.4392°N 0.1868°W

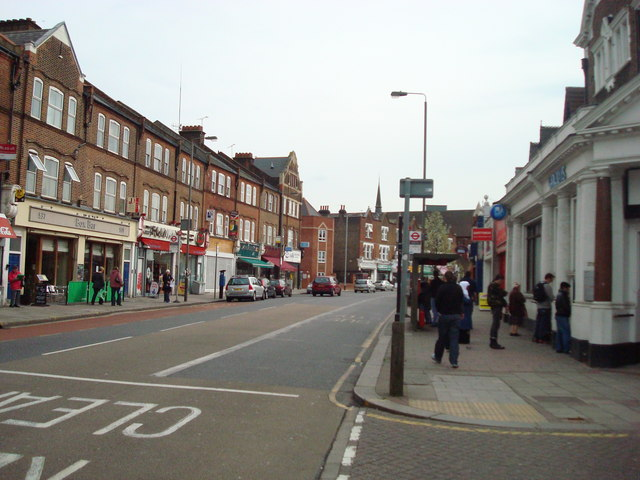
Garratt Lane in 2008

Garratt Lane is a long street (numbered to 1085) in the London Borough of Wandsworth, part of the A217 road. It connects Wandsworth High Street to Tooting Broadway and is approximately 4 kilometres (2.5 miles) long. It passes through the Earlsfield and Summerstown neighbourhoods which were fields of Wandsworth before their development in the late 19th century.

== Description ==
Land use along Garratt Lane is a mix of commercial and residential. In the north, Southside Wandsworth is a suburban shopping centre situated amongst other retail and local services. Heading south, the stretch between Allfarthing Lane and Burntwood Lane is mainly diverse shophouses, including a few professional services, and the southern portion is mainly residential, although around Summerstown there are a few light industries, access to Wimbledon Stadium (now Plough Lane, home of AFC Wimbledon) and Streatham Cemetery.

The southernmost part of Garratt Lane is unusual in that two parallel streets exchanged names. The original Garratt Lane was a narrower street than Garratt Terrace, which was the main connection to Tooting Broadway. Many people mistakenly called it Garratt Lane, so it was agreed to exchange the names.

The south-east end of Garratt Lane, running from the junction with Fountain Road and Upper Tooting Road, was previously called Defoe Road.

== Garrat Elections ==
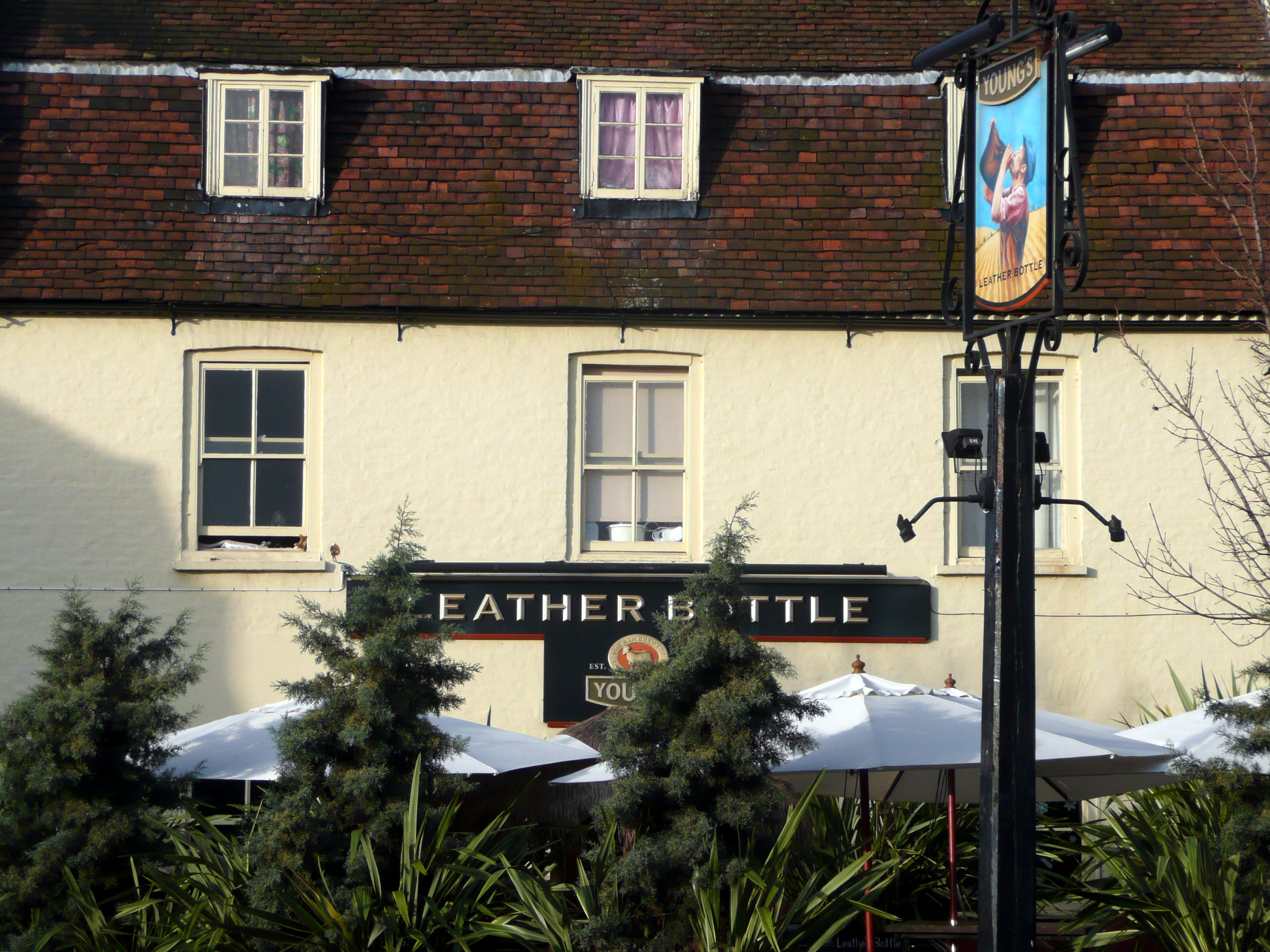
The Leather Bottle, Earlsfield

Most large public houses have survived along Garratt Lane, including The Old Sergeant and the Leather Bottle, both of which date to the 18th century. The latter figured in the mock Garrat Elections of the late 18th century, which were featured in the play The Mayor of Garratt by Samuel Foote.

== Transportation ==
Garratt Lane is one of three major north–south routes in south-west Inner London, i.e. between the Lambeth/Southwark south bank areas and the gradual widening and receiving of local roads to the arterial A3, west of Wandsworth. The Lane follows a bank of the River Wandle so has quite a consistent rise as with the parallel A218 on the higher, western bank. Industries grew up in the 18th and 19th centuries along this east bank, which led to its prominence. A 1741 map of Rocque shows a road with a near identical orientation, which strongly implies the road had early origins. A 1786 map shows and names Garratt Lane running approximately on its present route. This map also shows two lanes that intersect named: Half Farthing (now Allfarthing) and Burnt Wood (now Burntwood). The sub-settlement on its length was Garratt Green, Wandsworth.

In 1803 the first commercial railway in Britain was opened along much of the northern section. This was the Surrey Iron Railway which connected the Thames at Wandsworth with these industries, and those in Merton and Croydon. No sign remains of the railway which was horse-drawn.

Public transport in the form of horse buses was placed on the street in the latter part of the 19th century, and in 1903 the London County Council (LCC) extended and electrified the tramways. The trams started at the Thames near Westminster and went west and southwest on three route, one through Clapham Junction to Wandsworth, another through Brixton to Streatham, and one through Balham to Wimbledon. The routes through Garratt Lane connected all three with the focal point being Tooting.

When the London Passenger Transport Board was formed in 1933 to control all of London's transport, route 12 (from Tooting to London Bridge via Wandsworth & Battersea) and route 30 (from Tooting to Shepherd's Bush via Putney) ran the length of Garratt Lane. These routes were transformed to trolleybus (612 and 630) routes in 1937 with conversion to bus service in the 1960s (No 44 & 220 (later replaced by the 270) respectively) as London's tram services were discontinued. Garratt Lane is served along its length by TfL bus routes 44, 77, and 270. Routes G1, 155, 264, 280 and 493 serve the southern end, with the G1 continuing to Battersea via St George's Hospital and Burntwood Lane, and the remainder terminating at St George's Hospital. Routes 28 and 220 terminate at Southside Wandsworth at the northern end of Garratt Lane.

The South West Main Line serves Garratt Lane at Earlsfield and the nearest London Underground station is Tooting Broadway, just opposite the south end of Garratt Lane at the junction of the A24 and A217.

== Buildings listed by the Borough ==
There are four listed properties on Garratt Lane:

- The Old Court House near Wandsworth High Street is set back from Garratt Lane by a small public garden. It held the Wandsworth Museum until 2008, when it was converted into a public library.
- St Andrews Church is in Earlsfield and is the Church of England parish church
- The Leather Bottle Public House, at Summers Green, has historic connections. It is documented as being in existence in 1745, but is probably older. Its appearance has changed little over the last 150 years. One of the engravings by Valentine Green, shows election of a Mayor of Garratt (1781) in front of the Leather Bottle.
- St Clement Danes Almshouses is also known as Diprose Lodge. It is within a walled estate in Earlsfield. The Almshouses are now owned and operated by the Borough of Merton.

== Local history plaques ==
- The Corruganza Boxmakers whose strike in 1908 was a key moment in the struggle for women’s rights in the workplace in the Burtop Estate, 582-590A Garratt Lane
- Location of the longest continuous trade at 476 Garratt Lane
- Marc Bolan's teenage residence in Summerstown at 646 Garratt Lane
- Sidney Lewis (1903-1969), the youngest British soldier First World War at 934 Garratt Lane
