= Ursula Booth =

British stage actress

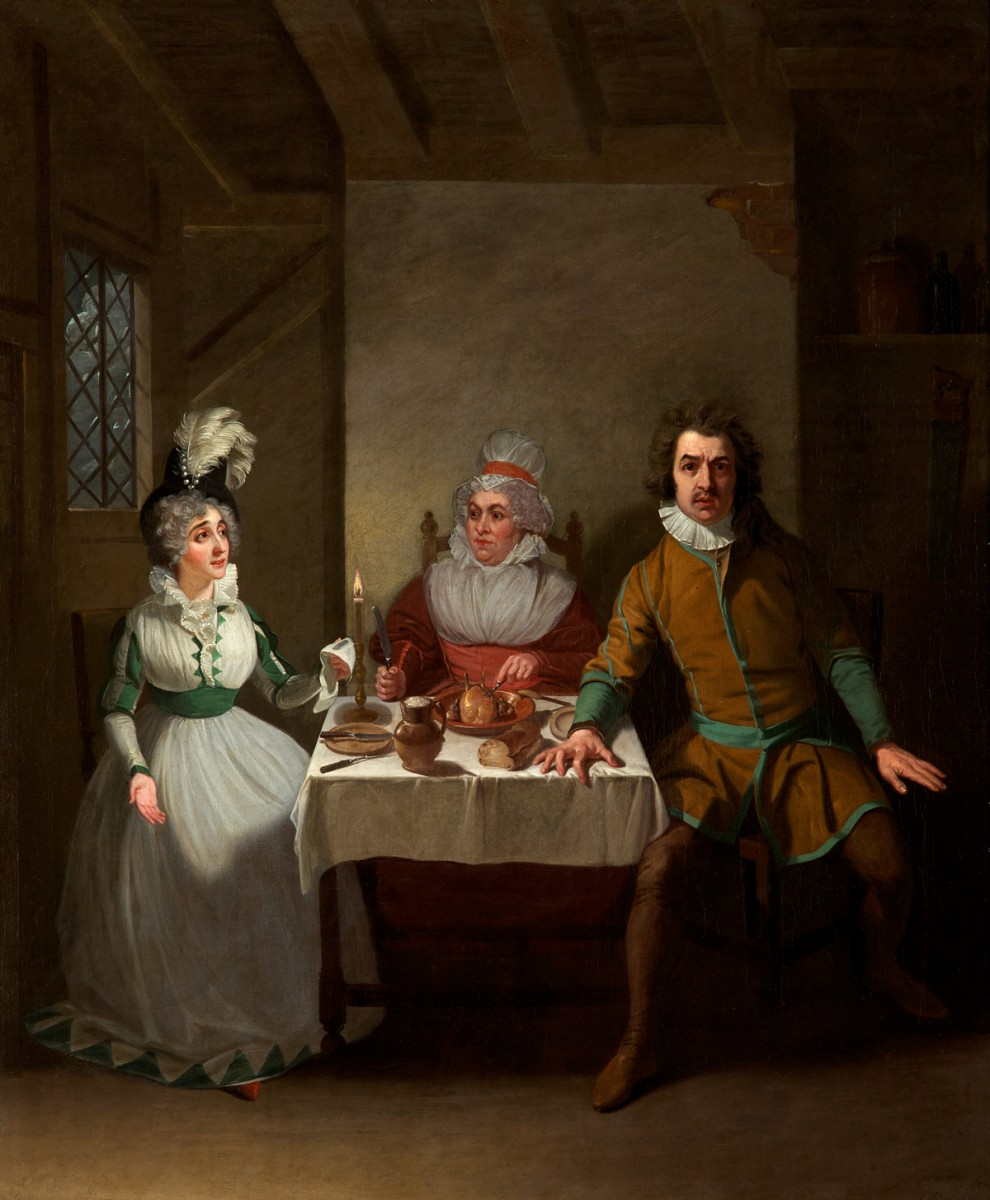
- Bland, Booth, and Bannister in 'The Children in the Wood' by Morton, Haymarket Theatre, 1793 by Samuel de Wilde
- Born: 1740
- Died: August 1803 (aged 62–63)
- Occupation: Stage actor

Ursula Agnes Booth (1740–1803) was a British stage actress of the eighteenth century. She first appeared at the Theatre Royal, Covent Garden in London on 1 November 1775, but at the season switched to the rival Theatre Royal, Drury Lane and remained a part of the company for the next twenty years under the management of Richard Brinsley Sheridan. She specialised in character roles of older woman. She also appeared in the summers at the Haymarket. Her husband John Booth was the resident tailor at Drury Lane. She was the mother of the actress Elizabeth Field who married the actor William Wallack and was therefore the grandmother of James William Wallack and Henry John Wallack.

== Selected roles ==
- Mrs Goodison in The Jew by Richard Cumberland (1794)
- Mrs Rigid in The Will by Frederick Reynolds (1797)

== Bibliography ==
- Bratton, Jacqueline S. New Readings in Theatre History. Cambridge University Press, 2003.
- Highfill, Philip H, Burnim, Kalman A. & Langhans, Edward A. A Biographical Dictionary of Actors, Actresses, Musicians, Dancers, Managers and Other Stage Personnel in London, 1660–1800, Volume 2. SIU Press, 1973.
