= Sambrook's Brewery =

Brewery in Wandsworth, London

Coordinates: 51.470050°N 0.176121°W

- Type: Brewery
- Industry: Alcoholic beverage
- Founded: 2008
- Founder: Duncan Sambrook
- Headquarters: Wandsworth; London, SW18; United Kingdom
- Products: Beer
- Number of employees: 10-50
- Website: sambrooksbrewery.co.uk

Sambrook's Brewery is a British brewery, based in Wandsworth, London. The location is the oldest continually brewing site in the UK.

Founded in 2008 by former City accountant Duncan Sambrook in nearby Battersea, the brewery was among the first wave of new London breweries in the early 21st century.

The brewery specialises in traditional cask ale and bottle and keg beers, many of them named after local landmarks in south-west London. Its flagship bitter Wandle is named after the River Wandle and has won several awards, including World's Best Bitter (pale beers up to 5% ABV) at the 2012 World Beer Awards.

Since relocating to Wandsworth in 2020–2021, Sambrook's has brewed on the former Young's Ram Brewery site, which local heritage bodies promote as the UK's oldest continuously brewing location, with origins in the sixteenth century.

== History ==
Sambrooks started brewing in Battersea 2008. It was founded by Duncan Sambrook, who had been an accountant for Deloitte, with support from David Welsh, the former owner of the Ringwood Brewery.

In July 2019, Sambrook's announced plans to relocate from Battersea to the former Young's Ram Brewery site in Wandsworth, as part of the Ram Quarter redevelopment on the River Wandle. The project included a new brewhouse, taproom, visitor centre and brewery museum on a site where commercial brewing had taken place for several centuries.

Work on the new brewery was delayed by the COVID-19 pandemic, but brewing eventually transferred from Battersea to Wandsworth in late 2020. The taproom and visitor centre opened to the public in 2021, on the brewery's fifteenth anniversary. The redevelopment retained historic brewery buildings and incorporated a small heritage centre.

At the Ram Quarter Sambrook's works with long-serving brewer John Hatch, who kept small-scale brewing going on the site after Young's closure in 2006.

Hatch leads regular tours that combine tutored tastings with visits to the heritage centre, where displays highlight the Ram Brewery's history and its role in London's beer culture.

== Brewery and facilities ==
The Wandsworth brewery operates from restored Victorian-era buildings within the Ram Quarter complex, alongside residential and retail units. Sambrook's describes its mission as maintaining and celebrating London's cask-ale brewing tradition, focusing on British malt and hop varieties and classic beer styles.

Sambrook's Taproom, housed on the Ram Quarter site, serves the brewery's core and seasonal beers alongside Neapolitan pizza and other food, and hosts events such as live music, sports screenings and beer festivals. The brewery runs an annual "Beer by the River" week, a festival at the Ram Quarter featuring guest breweries, music and comedy. The heritage centre, developed in partnership with local cultural organisations, displays brewing artefacts and memorabilia from the former Young's brewery and from Sambrook's own history.

== Beers ==
From its inception, Sambrook's has focused on traditional British ales brewed with a modern approach, with many of its beers named after features of south-west London such as local rivers, railway junctions and industrial landmarks. Wandle, a 3.8% ABV pale bitter named for the River Wandle, has been the brewery's flagship beer since 2008.

In 2019 the brewery's Russian Imperial Stout received a gold medal at the World Beer Awards.

=== List of beers ===
- Wandle Ale
- Junction Ale
- Powerhouse Porter
- Pumphouse Pale Ale
- Lavender Hill
- Russian Imperial Stout
- Session Pale Ale
- Pagoda Pilsner
- Block Party IPA
- Stand Easy Non alcoholic Pale Ale

== See also ==
- Beer in England
