= Wells & Co =

Vertically integrated British regional brewer

Coordinates: 52.1313°N 0.4822°W

Wells & Co.
- Industry: Hospitality industry and alcoholic beverages
- Founded: 1876
- Founder: Charles Wells
- Headquarters: Bedford, England
- Key people: Peter Wells, Paul Wells
- Products: Public houses and beer
- Revenue: £225.1 million
- Divisions: Charles Wells Brewery (formerly Wells & Young's Brewery), Charles Wells Pub Company, John Bull Pub Company, Cockburn and Campbell Wines, Apostrophe Pubs, and Pizza, Pots and Pints.

Wells & Co. (formerly Charles Wells Ltd) is the holding company of the Charles Wells Brewery and Pub Company (a pub chain). Charles Wells Ltd was founded in 1876 by Charles Wells in Bedford, England.

The Charles Wells Pub Company controls over 200 leased and tenanted public houses in England. The company also directly owns and manages 13 pubs in France (under the name John Bull Pub Company) and several managed houses in England under the Apostrophe Pubs and Pizza, Pots and Pints brands.

Charles Wells sold its Bedford based brewery and most of its beer brands to Marston's in May 2017, for £55 million. Brands sold to them included Young's, Courage and McEwan's beers, along with contract beers, such as Kirin Ichiban and UK distribution rights to Estrella, Erdinger, Founders Brewing Company, Devil's Peak Brewing Company and Small Town Brewery. Charles Wells did, however, retain its Charlie Wells brands.

== History ==
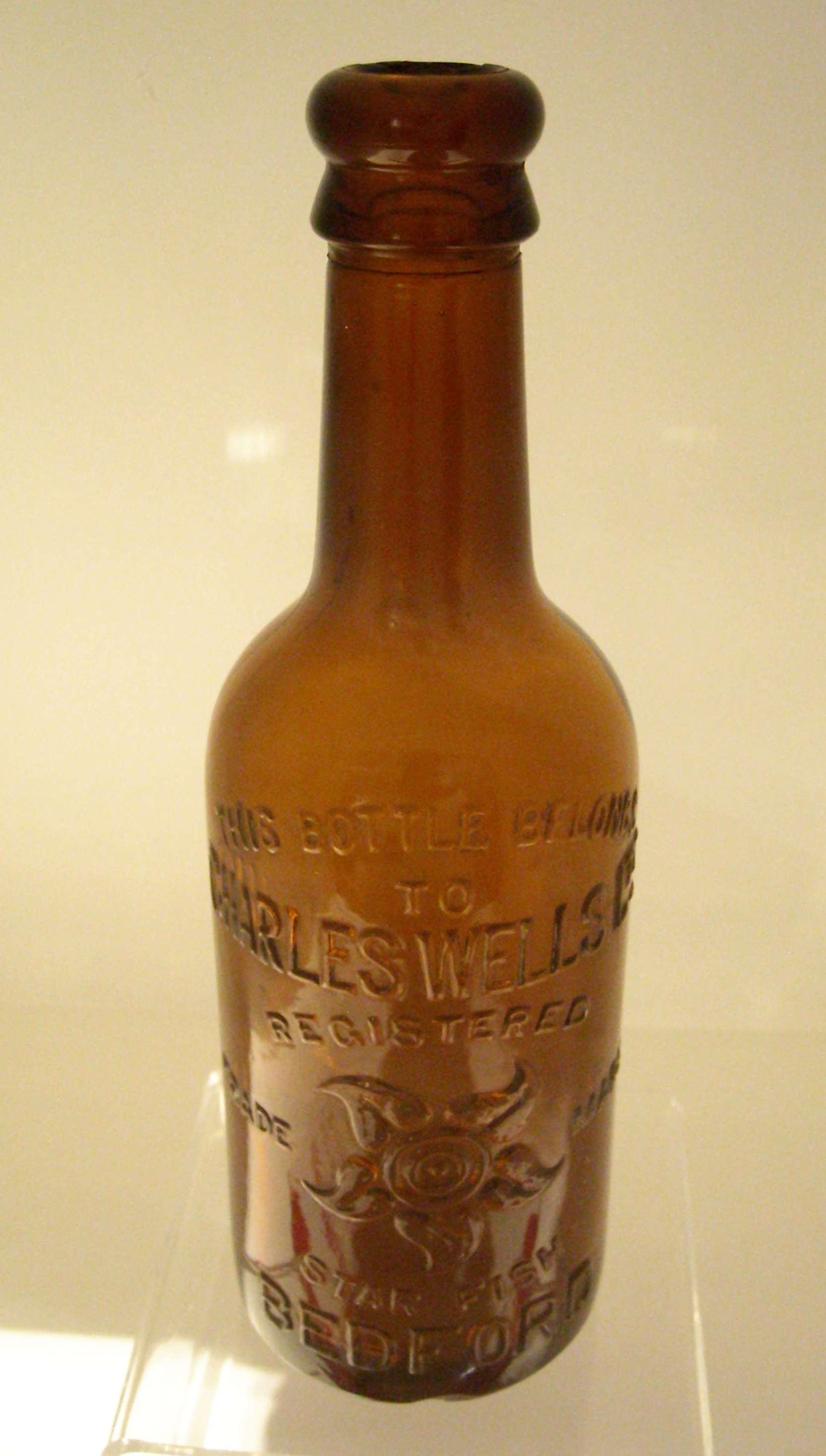
Late 19th / early 20th century beer bottle with old Charles Wells starfish trademark, on display at The Higgins.

Charles Wells Ltd (also known as Charles Wells Brewery and Pub Company, and previously as Charles Wells Family Brewery) was founded by Charles Wells in 1876. In 1875, a 2¼-acre site came to auction on the banks of the River Ouse as it ran through Bedford. This site contained both a coal depot and a brew house; included in the price were 35 pubs, mainly in Bedford and the surrounding area.

Wells thought that beer would always be in demand, and with the help of his father-in-law he purchased the site and began work to turn the small brew house into a fully fledged brewery which could serve the county.

As water is an essential ingredient for any beer, Wells believed that good quality water is vital to create the best beer. In 1902, Wells climbed a local hill a couple of miles from the brewery and sank his own well to tap into an underground reservoir of water, purified through layers of chalk and limestone. All beers to this day, both their own and under licence, are made with the certified mineral water drawn from this well.

By 1976, exactly 100 years since the company was established, the brewing operation moved from the Horne Lane site to a new site, the Eagle Brewery on Havelock Street. The move came about due to an increased demand for the company's beers, spurred on by a deal with Red Stripe brewery Desnoes & Geddes. This offered the company the chance to install the most up-to-date brewing equipment, and a state of the art bottling line.

The company is still in the family's hands, with the fifth generation coming into the business. There are currently six members of the family who work within the company, serving the Charles Wells Brewery, Charles Wells Pub Company, and John Bull Pub Company. Charles Wells Pub Company has an estate of more than 200 pubs predominantly based across the Eastern and Northern Home Counties regions, while Charles Wells beers are distributed through both the Charles Wells and Young's pub estates, as well as through various free houses

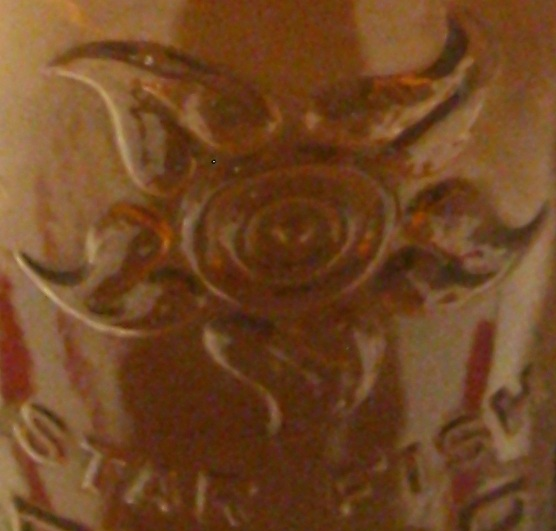
"STAR FISH" art from Charles Wells Ltd bottle

== Charles Wells ==
Charles Wells, after whom the company is named, was born in Bedford in 1842; he left school at the age of 14 and ran away to sea by boarding the frigate 'Devonshire' which was bound for India. In the late 1860s, Wells was promoted to Chief Officer when he fell in love with and proposed to a Josephine Grimbley. Unfortunately, his prospective father-in-law put paid to his plans when he announced that no daughter of his would marry a man who would be away at sea for months at a time. And so Wells, desperate to marry his sweetheart, left his seafaring career and in 1876 established the Charles Wells Family Brewery to provide beer for the local population of Bedfordshire.

== Charles Wells Pub Company ==
The Charles Wells Pub Company was formed as a distinct pub estate for Charles Wells Ltd when the parent company merged its brewing operations with London's Young's Brewery to form Wells & Young's Brewery. The pub company controls over 200 houses, all run on tenancy or lease agreements, and declared an operating profit of £6 million in December 2008. In 2013 the pub company announced its move into managed houses, with the first site set to open in 2014.

The company has become well known for the support it gives to its licensees and won the title of Pub Company of the Year (tenanted/leased 200+) at The Publican Awards for two years running – in 2009 and 2010. Charles Wells also won The Retention Award at the Springboard Awards for Excellence 2010 and 2012 and Best Recruitment Initiative in 2011 in recognition of its work in recruiting, training and supporting licensees. A further accolade was achieved at The Publican Awards 2014 when Charles Wells won the Best Pub Operations Team category for companies operating over 50 sites.

== Wells & Young's ==
On 23 May 2006 the company announced that it was to form a new joint venture brewing company with the Young & Co's brewery, who moved their brewing production from the Ram Brewery in Wandsworth. The firm was called Wells & Young's Brewing Co Ltd, with Charles Wells having a 60% stake and Young & Co 40%, it went into operation on 2 October 2006. In 2011, Charles Wells purchased Young's 40% share, moving the company into the sole ownership of Charles Wells of Bedford. Wells & Young's was responsible for brewing, distributing and marketing Charles Wells and Young & Co's brands at the Brewery in Bedford.

Further acquisition in 2011 saw the company buy McEwan's and Younger's beers as well as the Courage beers, extending its portfolio more widely across the UK.

In early 2015, the company went back to its roots and now trades as Charles Wells, once again, reuniting the different arms of the business under its founding name.

In May 2017, the company announced that it was selling the brewery and wine business to Marston's Brewery together with the Bombardier and McEwan's brands and rights to the Young's brands. It said it would set up a separate brewery in Bedford to brew Charles Wells-branded beers in two years' time.

== New brewery - Brewpoint ==
After the sale of its Eagle Brewery and most of its beer brands to Marston's, Charles Wells said that while it would now be focussing more on the pub side of its business, it would also build a small brewery in Bedford to produce beers exclusively for its own pub estate. The new brewery is called Brewpoint.The new brewery was completed in July 2020.
