= Jeffrey Dunstan =

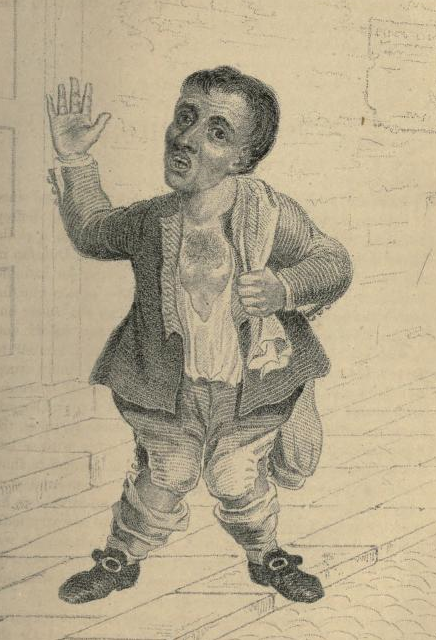
- Born: c. 1759
- Died: 1797

Jeffrey Dunstan (1759?–1797) was a second-hand wig seller in the West End of London who was the elected "mayor" of Garrat from 1785 to 1796, becoming a notable figure of his time.

== Life ==
Dunstan was a foundling, and as such was reared in the parish workhouse of St. Dunstan's-in-the-East. At the age of twelve he was apprenticed to a greengrocer, but ran away to Birmingham, where he worked in factories. After his return to London in 1776, his chief occupation was that of buying old wigs. His extraordinary appearance, and the droll way in which he clapped his hands to his mouth and called "old wigs", always used to attract a crowd of people after him in the streets. On the death of "Sir" John Harper in 1785, Dunstan was elected mayor of Garrat and began to be called "Sir" Jeffrey Dunstan.

The custom of the Garrat elections seems to have had its origin in a petty act of local injustice. Certain encroachments on Garrat Common, situated between Wandsworth and Tooting in Surrey, led to the formation of an association of the inhabitants for the protection of their rights. The head of this association was called the mayor, and one of the rules was that he should be re-chosen after every general election. The public soon entered into the joke, the mock election became highly popular, and the most eccentric characters were brought forward as candidates.

The popularity of the entertainment is sufficiently attested by the following entry in the 'Gentleman's Magazine' under 25 July 1781:

The septennial mock-election for Garrat was held this day, and upwards of fifty thousand persons were on that ludicrous occasion assembled at Wandsworth.

While Sir Richard Phillips relates that:

at the two last elections I was told that the road within a mile of Wandsworth was so blocked up by vehicles, that none could move backward or forward during many hours; and that the candidates, dressed like chimney-sweepers on May-day, or in the mock-fashion of the period, were brought to the hustings in the carriages of peers, drawn by six horses, the owners themselves condescending to become their drivers!

Possessing a large fund of vulgar wit, Sir Jeffrey was the most popular of the candidates who ever appeared on the Garrett hustings. He was successful at three successive elections, but in 1796 was ousted from his office by "Sir" Harry Dimsdale, a muffin-seller and dealer in tinware. This was the last election which took place at Garrett, though an unsuccessful attempt to revive the custom was made some thirty years after.

In Charles Lamb's Reminiscence of Sir Jeffery Dunstan, reference is made to the attempt to bring Dunstan out on the Haymarket stage, in the part of Dr. Last.

The announcement drew a crowded house; but notwithstanding infinite tutoring—by Foote or Garrick, I forget which—when the curtain drew up, the heart of Sir Jeffery failed, and he faultered on, and made nothing of his part, till the hisses of the house at last in very kindness dismissed him from the boards. Great as his parliamentary eloquence had shown itself; brilliantly as his off-hand sallies had sparkled on a hustings; they here totally failed him.

Dunstan appeared on some trade tokens issued by Thomas Hall, Taxidermist of City Road Finsbury. The tokens were issued in 1795 in connection with Halls trade as a taxidermist and his exhibition of stuffed animals at his home in City Road dubbed the Finsbury Museum.

The tokens commemorated the fact that Hall had employed Dunstan as a huckster at his exhibits at the Bartholomew Fair.

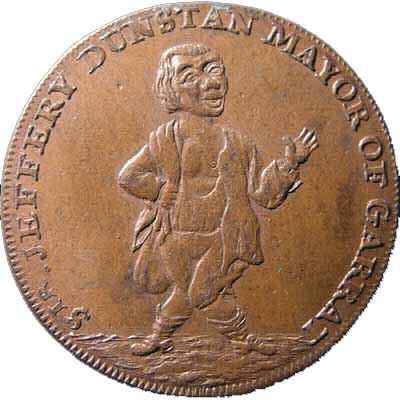
Face of Trade token issued by T.Hall, Finsbury 1795

Dunstan died in 1797, and was buried in the churchyard of St Mary Matfelon, Whitechapel. Some curious illustrations from the drawings of Valentine Green, portraying the humours of a Garrett election, will be found in the Book of Days, and portraits of Dunstan are given in Hone's Every Day Book, and Wilson's Wonderful Characters. Foote attended the election in 1761, and in 1763 produced at the theatre in the Haymarket, his comedy of The Mayor of Garret, London, 1764, octavo, which was met with great success.

Bootham Park Hospital in York holds the only known portrait of him (artist unknown).
