= The Will (play) =

1797 play

- 1822 edition
- Original language: English
- Written by: Frederick Reynolds
- Genre: Comedy
- Setting: Manderville Castle, Devon, present day

Premiere
- Date: 19 April 1797
- Place: Theatre Royal, Drury Lane, London

The Will is a 1797 comedy play by the British writer Frederick Reynolds. It premiered at the Theatre Royal, Drury Lane in London on 19 April 1797. The original cast included Thomas King as Sir Solomon Cynic, Richard Wroughton as Mandeville, John Bannister as Howard, Robert Palmer as Veritas, Richard Suett as Realize, Samuel Thomas Russell as Robert, John Hayman Packer as Old Copsley, Dorothea Jordan as Albina Mandeville, Charlotte Tidswell as Deborah, Ursula Booth as Mrs Rigid and Harriet Mellon as Cicely Copsley. The Irish premiere took place at Dublin's Crow Street Theatre on 16 December 1799.

== Bibliography ==
- Greene, John C. Theatre in Dublin, 1745-1820: A Calendar of Performances, Volume 6. Lexington Books, 2011.
- Nicoll, Allardyce. A History of English Drama 1660–1900: Volume IV. Cambridge University Press, 2009.
