= John Young (brewer) =

English brewer (1921–2006)

- Born: 7 August 1921; Winchester
- Died: 17 September 2006 (aged 85); Wisborough Green, West Sussex
- Occupation: Brewer

John Allen Young CBE (7 August 1921 in Winchester – 17 September 2006, Wisborough Green, West Sussex) was an English brewer. He was for many years chairman of the Young's Brewery in Wandsworth, working there for over 50 years.

== Early life ==
Both his father, William Allen Young and his mother, Joan Barrow Simonds, were from well-known brewing families. John was educated at the Nautical College in Pangbourne. During the Second World War, he served as a fighter pilot in the Fleet Air Arm, attaining the rank of lieutenant commander in 1945 at the age of 24. During his service in the navy, he had flown 25 different types of aircraft and landed on six aircraft carriers.. After the war he continued his education at Corpus Christi College, Cambridge, where he obtained an honours degree in economics.

He started a career in shipping, and while in Antwerp, Belgium, he met his future wife, Yvonne Lieutenant. They married in 1951.

== Career at Young's Brewery ==
In 1954, while living in West Sussex, John, together with his brothers, were needed at Young's Brewery. He settled down there and by 1964 he had become chairman of Young's, replacing his father. He remained chairman of Young's until his death in 2006, a period of 40 years. His management style was "hands-on", frequently visiting his outlet pubs and departments at the brewery. Innovation was made, but tradition was acknowledged. For example; he introduced children's rooms to many pubs.

John Young had a love for working horses and was instrumental in preventing the disappearance of Shire horses from Britain. At the brewery, he determined that local deliveries by horse drawn drays should continue into the 21st century. He was president of the London Harness Horse Parade from 1957 to 1968 and of the Greater London Horse Show 1972–74.

== Charity ==
John Young was active in charities. He was chairman of the National Hospital for Nervous Diseases in Bloomsbury. He raised a considerable amount for this and other charities. He was also governor of the National Society for Epilepsy. For this work and his activity in brewing, he was appointed a CBE in 1975, and he was made a Freeman of the City of London in 1986.

== Association with the Real Ale Movement ==
John Young became a champion in the eyes of the Real Ale Movement when he decided that Young's would continue brewing cask ale at a time when most breweries were changing to keg beer, a method considered more efficient, but according to many drinkers, less flavourful. This also resulted in a number of Young's brews being given approval by the Campaign for Real Ale (CAMRA).

== Later life and death ==
Young's Brewery was situated in the centre of Wandsworth. Brewing had taken place on the site for almost 500 years (the earliest documented evidence of brewing on the site dates from 1533), and Young's Brewery had been based there since its founding in 1831. But rising costs required the brewery to leave London, and John Young negotiated the sale of the Ram Brewery, and made an association with Wells Brewery in Bedford, to combine the companies and to have Young's beers brewed in Bedford. Brewing in Wandsworth was tapered off, so that the last beer was brewed in September 2006, the same week as John Young died of cancer. Some of the last brew was served at his funeral. The decommissioning of the site took place over the next seven months, with beer being delivered by dray in Wandsworth up until April 2007. John young was survived by his son, James, and his daughter, Ilse.

== John Young Award ==
The John Young Award was introduced by CAMRA, London branch, to celebrate the memory of Young and his impact on real ale and pubs within London.

Its purpose is to acknowledge any individual or organisation that the London branches believe has done the most for Real ale in that year, or to raise the profile of CAMRA within London.

== John Young Room ==
The John Young Room was created in 2012 to commemorate both John and the Ram Brewery. It is situated in the Old Sergeant, in Garratt Lane, Wandsworth, and is the room over the old coach house, which can be seen from the street at the right of the building. Historic photos, signs and posters are displayed on the walls and a cabinet holds smaller articles.

The Old Sergeant has existed as a licensed premises since at least 1785, when John Nash held the licence. The Young family purchased it from Earl Spencer, in 1857. Although it is typical of a small pub in a less affluent area, it was awarded as the Best Community Pub in Britain for 2012. The building has an example of a 19th-century Coach house, which is visible from the street

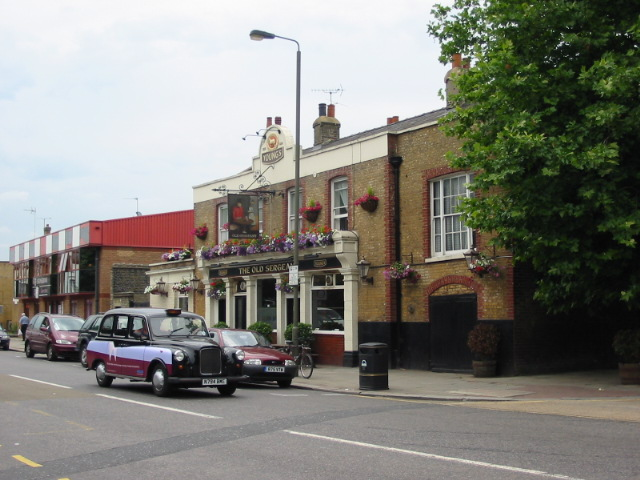

== Sources ==
- Campaign for Real Ale. "John Young Memorial Award". Campaign for Real Ale. Archived from the original on 21 February 2014.
- "The Great British Pub Awards: 2012 Winners". Archived from the original on 3 January 2014.
- Jackson, Michael (20 September 2006). "John Young: Visionary chairman for four decades of Young's brewery". The Independent. Archived from the original on 25 September 2013.
- "Master brewer John Young dies". The Daily Telegraph. 19 September 2006.
- Osborn, Helen (1991). Inn and Around London. ISBN 0951816705.
- Young, John (February 2007). Acting UP. ISBN 978-1841041674.
- Protz, Roger (20 September 2006). "John Young: At the sign of the Ram, he stuck with brewing tradition to rekindle the fortunes of his family's cask ales". The Guardian.
