= Altab Ali =

Bangladeshi man killed in the UK (1953–1978)

- আলতাব আলী
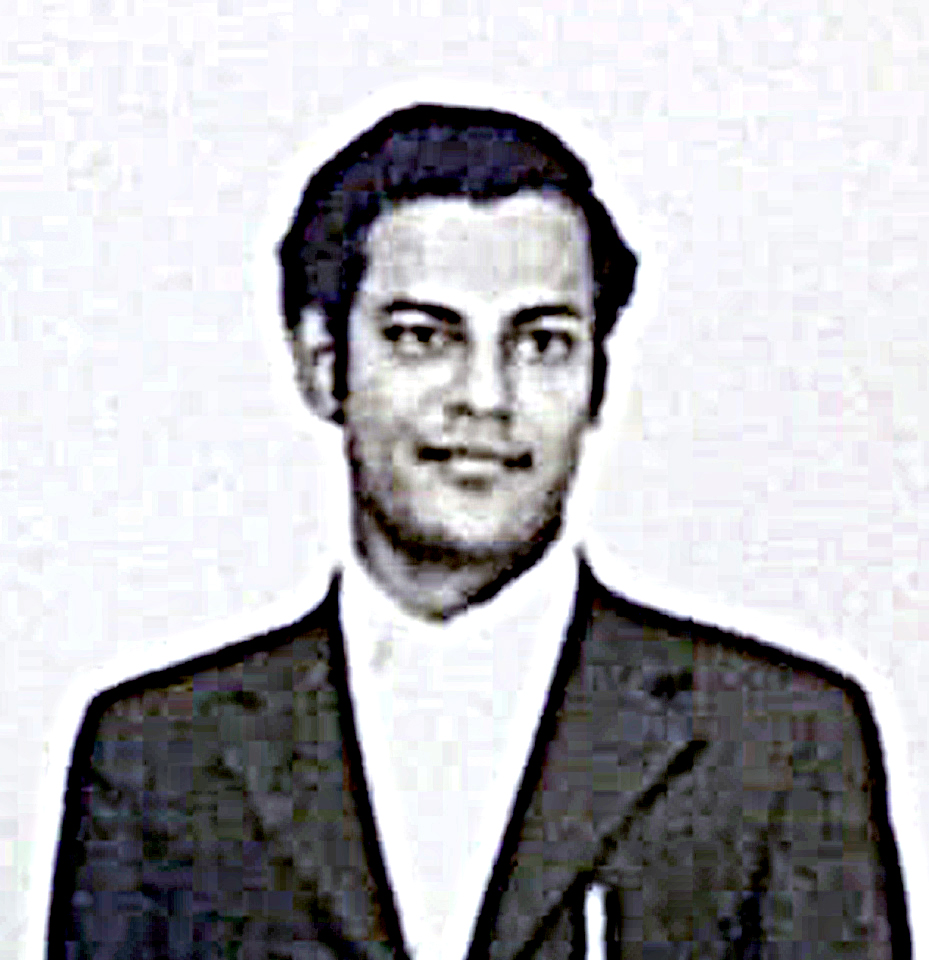
- Ali, 1974
- Born: 1953; Sylhet District, East Bengal, Pakistan
- Died: 4 May 1978 (aged 24); St Mary's Park, London, United Kingdom
- Resting place: Sylhet District, Bangladesh
- Occupation: Textile worker

Altab Ali (Bengali: আলতাব আলী; 24 October 1953 – 4 May 1978) was a Bangladeshi textile worker stabbed to death in London, in a racially motivated killing. His death sparked widespread outrage and grassroots action that helped to reduce racism against British Bangladeshis and British Asians in the United Kingdom.

== Early life ==
Ali flew from East Pakistan to London Heathrow Airport on transit to Moseley in Birmingham on 23 August 1968 with his uncle, Abdul Hashim. In 1975, he returned to Bangladesh to be married. At the time of his death, Ali was 24 and worked as a textile worker in an area off Brick Lane.

== Death ==
On 4 May 1978, a day when local elections were being held, Ali was stabbed in Adler Street, adjacent to the open space then known as St Mary's Park. He was attacked by three teenagers: Roy Arnold and Carl Ludlow were both 17 years old, the third boy was of mixed race, 16 years old and named by his surname in March 2020 as part of the Freedom of Information. He was declared dead on arrival at the Royal London Hospital. The BBC reported the murder as racially motivated and random.

== Legacy ==
Ali's death sparked protests within the area. The ethnic minorities of the area (“Bangladeshi people, Caribbean people, Indian people, Pakistani people”) collaborated to call for change. 10 days after the death, a group of protestors marched across central London in a campaign to end racism. They took the coffin of Ali to Downing Street.

In 1989, a memorial arch was built at the scene of Ali's murder, and in 1998 the park was renamed to Altab Ali Park. In 2015, it was announced that the borough of Tower Hamlets would host an annual Altab Ali Commemoration Day.
