= The Jew =

1794 play by Richard Cumberland

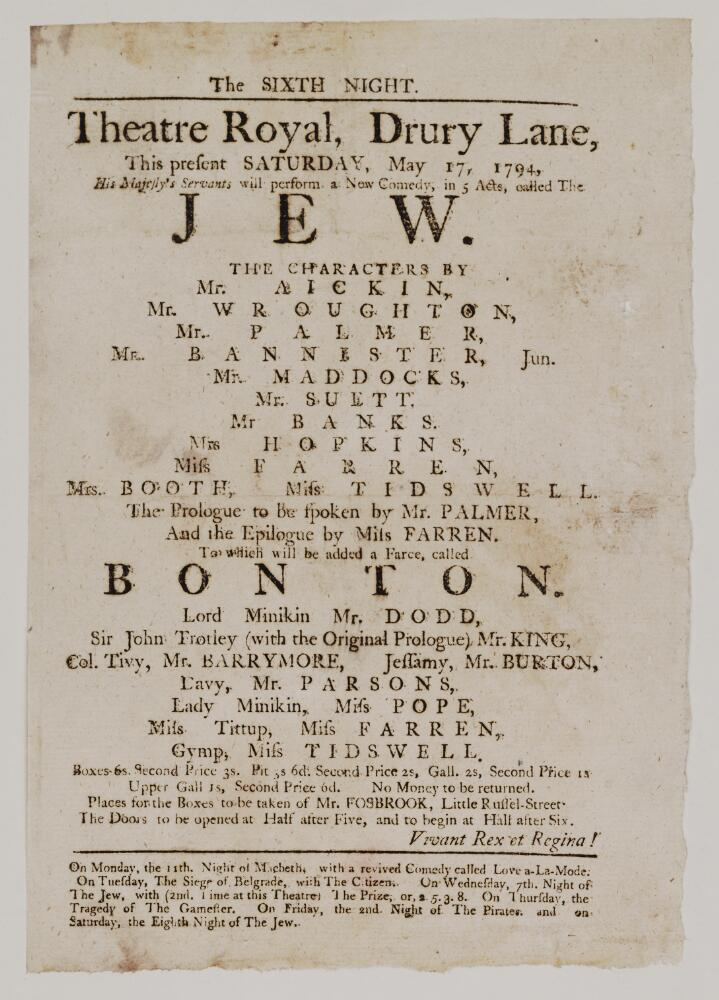
- Original language: English
- Written by: Richard Cumberland
- Genre: Comedy
- Setting: London, present day

Premiere
- Date: 8 May 1794
- Place: Theatre Royal, Drury Lane, London

The Jew is a comedy written by playwright Richard Cumberland and first presented at the Theatre Royal, Drury Lane in London on 8 May 1794. The play is notable as the first play in the English theatre to portray a Jewish moneylender as the hero of a stage production.

The anti-Jewish tradition on the English stage dates back at least to the expulsion of the Jews from England in 1290 and is exemplified by the characters of Shylock in William Shakespeare's The Merchant of Venice and Barabas in Christopher Marlowe's The Jew of Malta. In a series of articles called Observer, first published in 1785, Cumberland created a character named Abraham Abrahams who would later serve as a template for Sheva, the title character in The Jew. In one instalment of Observer, Abrahams is quoted as saying, "I verily believe the odious character of Shylock has brought little less persecution upon us, poor scattered sons of Abraham, than the Inquisition itself." A decade later, in writing The Jew, Cumberland sought to create a positive image of a Jewish man that would counteract centuries of antisemitic portraits. The tremendous success of the initial production prompted Cumberland to later write, "The benevolence of the audience assisted me in rescuing a forlorn and persecuted character, which till then had only been brought upon the stage for the unmanly purpose of being made a spectacle of contempt, and a butt for ridicule. In the success of this comedy I felt of course a greater gratification, than I had ever felt upon a like occasion."

The original London cast included James Aickin as Sir Stephan Bertram, John Palmer as Frederic, Richard Wroughton as Charles Ratcliffe, Walter Maddocks as Saunders, John Bannister as Sheva, Richard Suett as Jabal, Elizabeth Hopkins as Mrs Ratcliffe, Elizabeth Farren as Louisa Ratcliffe, Ursula Booth as Mrs Goodison, Charlotte Tidswell as Dorcas. Shortly after its London premiere, the play began to be performed in the United States, first in Boston, Philadelphia, and New York City and, later, in Richmond, Charleston, and many other cities and towns. The play was also translated into numerous languages including German, French, Hebrew, Yiddish, and Russian. The last known New York production under its original title was presented at the Bronx Free Synagogue in 1919.

== Plot ==
Charles, a young clerk employed in the counting house of the merchant Sir Stephen Bertram is fired because his sister Eliza is romantically involved with Sir Stephen's son, Frederick (who is also Charles's best friend). Unknown to both Sir Stephen and Charles, Frederick and Eliza have already been secretly married. To help his now unemployed friend financially, Frederick seeks to borrow money from a Jewish moneylender named Sheva, who Frederick assumes is a merciless and stingy miser. Sheva is actually a very kind man and a sympathetic listener. When he realises that Charles is the son of "Don Carlos", a soldier who once rescued him from an angry mob in Cádiz, Spain, he decides to give Frederick the money to help his friend, and secretly invests money in Eliza's name to demonstrate to Sir Stephen that Eliza is a worthy wife for his son. Charles, however, is stubbornly proud and, when he learns that Frederick has secretly married his sister, he challenges his friend to a duel. Their sword fight ends quickly when Charles receives a minor cut on his wrist and, after the truth about Sheva's generous gift is revealed, everything ends happily.

== Characters ==
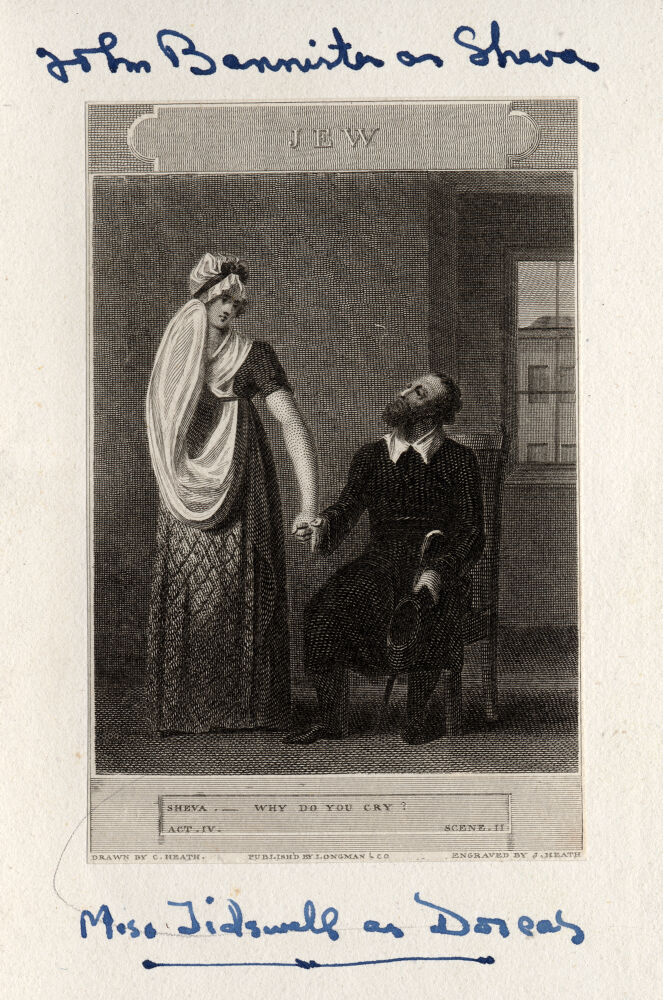
John Bannister as Sheva and Charlotte Tidswell as Dorcas

- Sheva – A moneylender who hides his benevolence beneath the mask of a miser
- Sir Stephen Bertram – A British merchant
- Frederick Bertram – Sir Stephen's son
- Saunders – Sir Stephen's assistant
- Charles Ratcliffe – A clerk in Sir Stephen's counting-house
- Elizabeth (Eliza) Ratcliffe – Sister to Charles and wife to Frederick
- Mrs. Ratcliffe – Mother to Charles and Eliza
- Dorcas – A Jewish woman, servant to Sheva and mother to Jabal/Jacob
- Jabal – A young Jewish boy, very thin and always hungry (renamed Jacob in Sheva, the Benevolent)
- Mrs. Goodison – A neighbour and friend to Sheva
- Waiter – A waiter in a local tavern (changed to a Serving Girl in Sheva, the Benevolent)
