= Wells & Young's Brewery =

Brewery formed by a merger of Charles Wells Ltd and Young's Brewery

Wells & Young's Brewing Company
- Industry: Brewing
- Founded: 2006
- Defunct: 2017
- Successors: Wells & Co; Marston's
- Headquarters: Bedford, England
- Products: Beer

Wells & Young's Brewery was formed in 2006 from a merger of the brewing operations of Charles Wells Ltd and Young's Brewery. Charles Wells initially had a 60% stake and Young's 40%. In 2011, Charles Wells took full control when it bought Young's 40% stake. Wells & Young's is now responsible for brewing, distributing and marketing Charles Wells' and Young & Co's brands at the Eagle Brewery in Bedford.

At the beginning of 2007, Wells and Young's made its first big investment and bought the Courage brands which included Courage Best and Courage Directors.

As well as brewing its own brands, the brewery contract brews other beers including Kirin Ichiban and Estrella Damm.

As well as selling its beers to Charles Wells and the Young's pubs, Wells and Young's supplies free trade and other pubs, as well as supermarkets. The company also distributes its products to the US, Canada, Russia, Japan, Europe and Australia.

Following a rebrand in 2015, the company traded as Charles Wells again, reuniting the different arms of the business under its founding name.

In 2017, Charles Wells sold the brewery and wine business to Marston's Brewery together with the Bombardier, McEwan's and Young's brands. The former Wells Brewery was renamed the Eagle Brewery by Marston's and in 2019 Young's rebranded its Bitter and Special as London Original and London Special respectively.

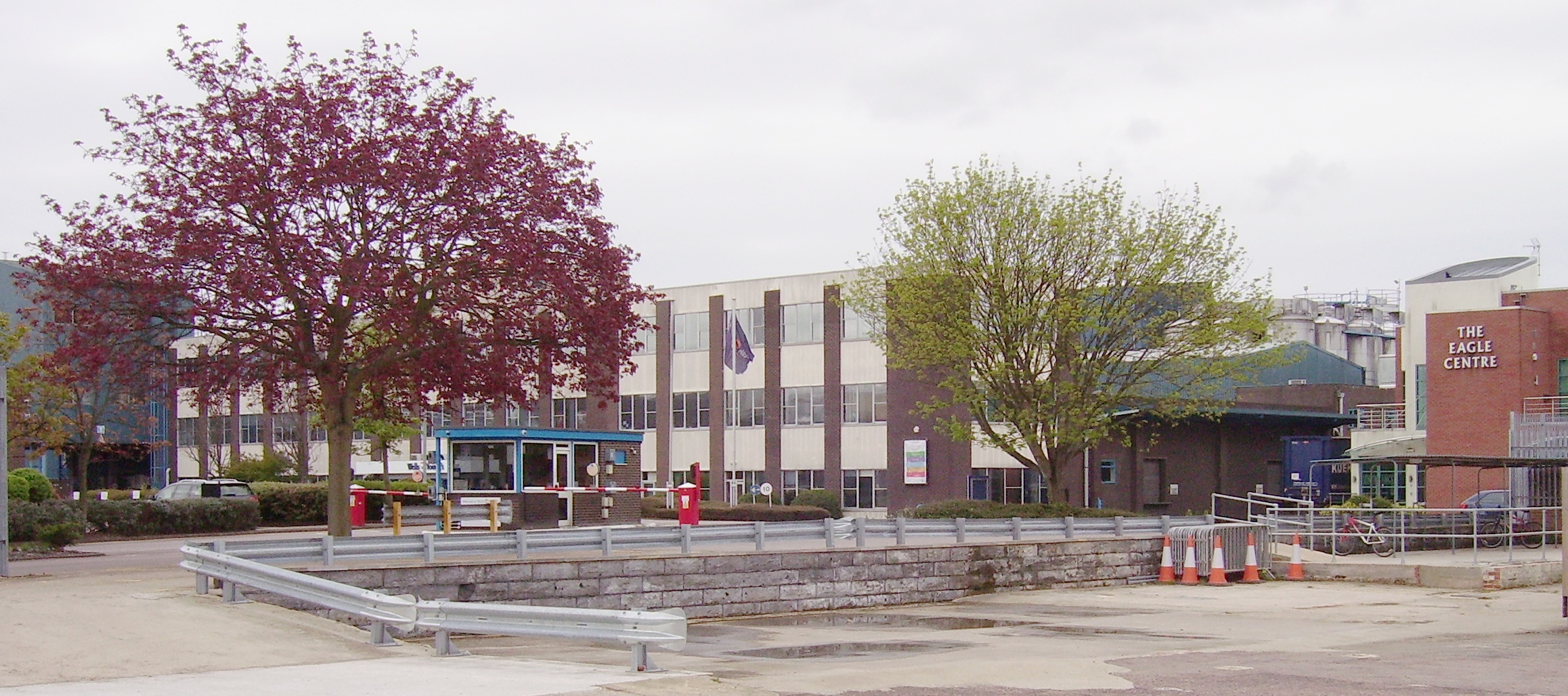
Brewery and company headquarters in Bedford

== Wells and Young's beers ==
=== Charles Wells ===
- Wells Bombardier – marketed as the 'Drink of England' with a strong link to English Heritage, it is a 4.1% cask beer, in bottles at 4.7% abv and canned at 4.3%. In 2009 Bombardier introduced the Cask Beer font. In 2010, 4.5 million litres of it were sold in Italy.
- Wells Bombardier Burning Gold is a 4.7% abv golden coloured light ale.
- Wells Bombardier Satanic Mills is a 5.0% abv dark coloured bitter.
- Wells Banana Bread Beer, A beer brewed with fairtrade bananas which is sold filtered and pasteurised in bottles at 5.2% abv, and unfiltered in the cask at 4.3% abv.
- Wells Eagle a 3.6% abv session bitter available in cask and smooth.
- John Bull, a 4.1% beer made with English Challenger and East Kent Goldings hops;
- Waggle Dance, a 5.0% abv pale ale made with the addition of South American honey, named after the waggle dance a bee performs to alert the hive of a source of nectar. The brand was originally owned and brewed by Sunderland-based brewer, Vaux; it was bought by Young's Brewery when the Vaux brewery was closed in 1999, and by 2008, the brand was transferred to Charles Wells beer.[4]
- Kestrel Super, 9.0% abv. Super strength brand acquired by Wells in 2005 from Scottish & Newcastle.

In a bid to move away from 'super strength' and to focus on the brewery's core brands, the Kestrel brand was sold in October 2012 to the company's managing director.

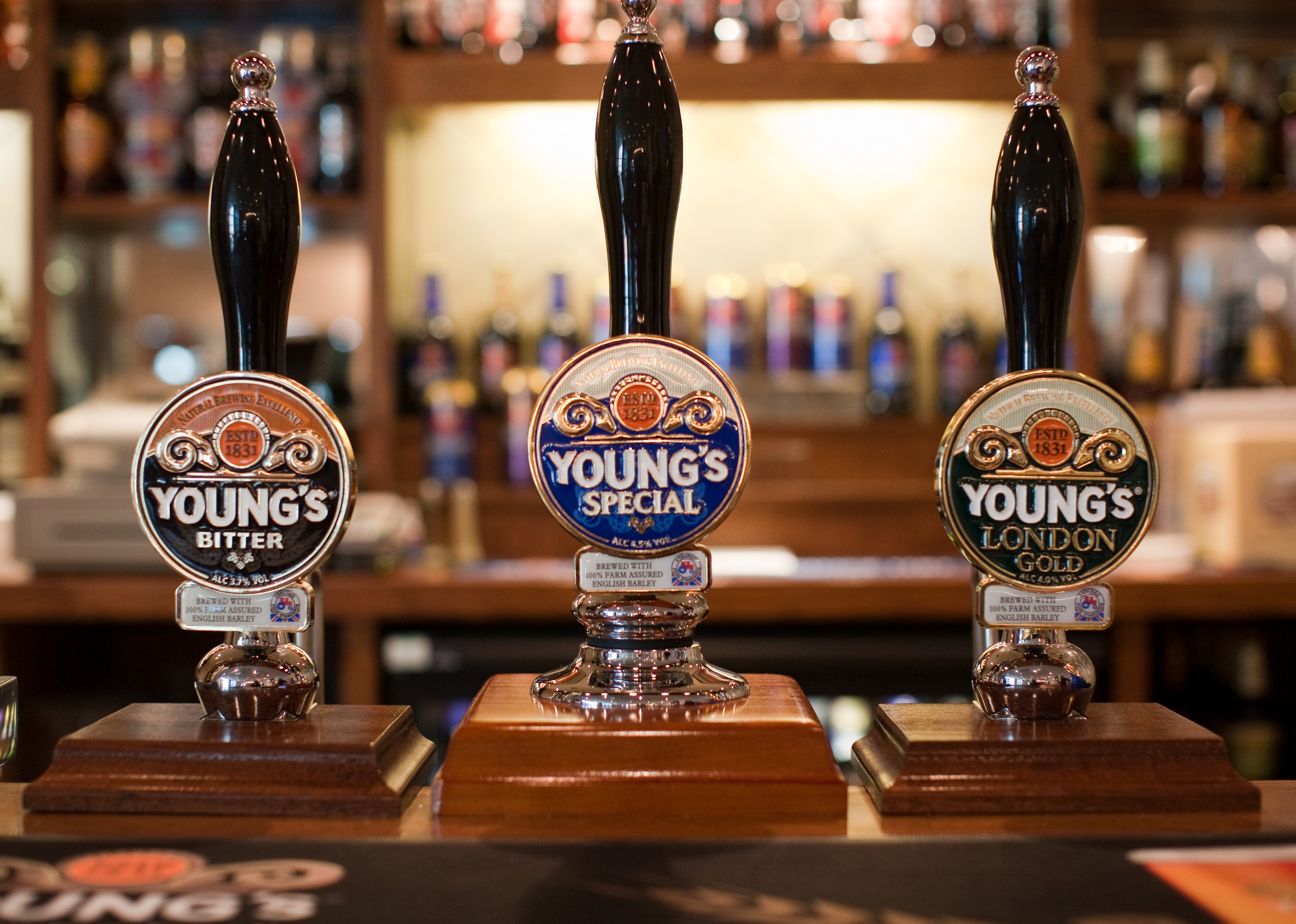
Young's beer range

=== Young's ===
Young's main brands are Young's Bitter (commonly known as Ordinary) renamed Young's London Original in 2019, a 3.7% abv bitter made with Red Tractor accredited Maris Otter and crystal malt and Fuggle and Golding hops; and Young's Special renamed Young's London Special in 2019, a 4.5% abv version of the Ordinary.

Bottle conditioned brands are Young's Bitter at 4.5% abv, Young's London Gold, and Young's Special London Ale, a 6.4% abv strong pale ale which was awarded a gold medal for bottle conditioned beer at the 1999 CAMRA Great British Beer Festival, and received a Grand Gold Medal at Monde Selection's World Quality Selections in 2010.

Bottled beers which are not bottle conditioned are: Young's Double Chocolate Stout, a 5.2% abv stout which contains dark chocolate essence and chocolate malt; and Young's Ram Rod, a 5% abv beer named after the Dorset Horn ram that lived in the Ram Brewery stables in Wandsworth, and on which the company's trademark is based;

Bottled beers Young's have brewed in the past include: Old Nick, a 7.2% abv barley wine; Young's St George's Ale, a 5.2% abv pale ale, dry hopped with English Pilgrim hops (occasionally available cask conditioned at 4.3% abv); Young's Winter Warmer; John Young's Christmas Ale; Young's Oatmeal Stout and Young's Christmas Pudding Ale.

Several Young's beers, including bottled mild ale Dirty Dick's, summer seasonal cask ale Golden Zest, Kew Brew and keg lager Young's Pilsner were discontinued as part of the rationalisation process that took place when Young & Co and Charles Wells brewing operations merged. Kew Brew has recently been relaunched as Kew Gold, a 4.8% abv bottle conditioned beer, with a donation from every purchase made to Kew Gardens.

=== Courage ===
In January 2007, Wells & Young's bought the brewing and marketing rights of the Courage brands, Courage Directors, Mild, Light Ale and Best from Scottish & Newcastle. It has subsequently rekindled production of the famous 10% abv bottled Courage Imperial Russian Stout initially for sale in the USA. S&N kept a minority stake in the brands until 2011.

=== McEwan's and Younger's ===
In late 2011, Wells and Young's Brewing Company purchased the Scottish McEwan's and Younger's brands from Heineken UK. This acquisition put Wells and Young's into the top three brewers in the UK.

== Contract brewing ==
Beers contract brewed and imported by Wells & Young's include:

Kirin Ichiban, a 5% abv pale lager, brewed under licence for the Japanese brewing company Kirin. It is brewed using the unique Ichiban Shibori brewing process, the most expensive in the world.

Estrella Damm – a 4.6% bottle and draught beer, now available in the UK. Wells and Young's import, market and distribute. Estrella Damm is brewed by Grupo Damm in Barcelona and is one of Spain's most popular beers.
