= Thomas Weston (actor) =

18th-century English actor

Thomas Weston (1737 – 18 January 1776) was an English actor.

== Life ==
Weston was the son of a cook. He made his first London appearance around 1759, and from 1763 until his death, he was considered to be the most amusing comedian on the English stage.

Weston was considered as “Foote's most faithful trouper and a gifted comedian. Samuel Foote wrote for him the part of Jerry Sneak in The Mayor of Garratt. Abel Drugger in the Alchemist was one of his famous performances; and Garrick, who also played this part, praised him highly for it. Georg Christoph Lichtenberg describes the craft and expertise skills of Weston's playing of comic 'business' as scrub.

He was in debt and had a problem with alcohol abuse. He died of a condition related to excessive consumption of alcohol. He died on 18 January 1776.

== Gallery ==
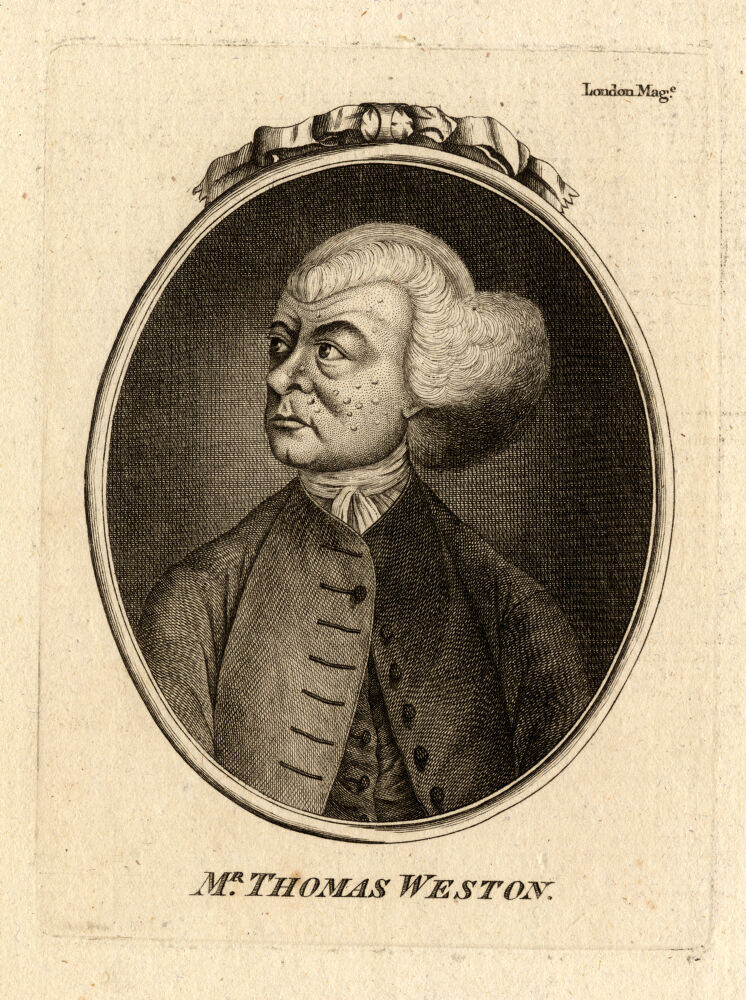
Weston in character

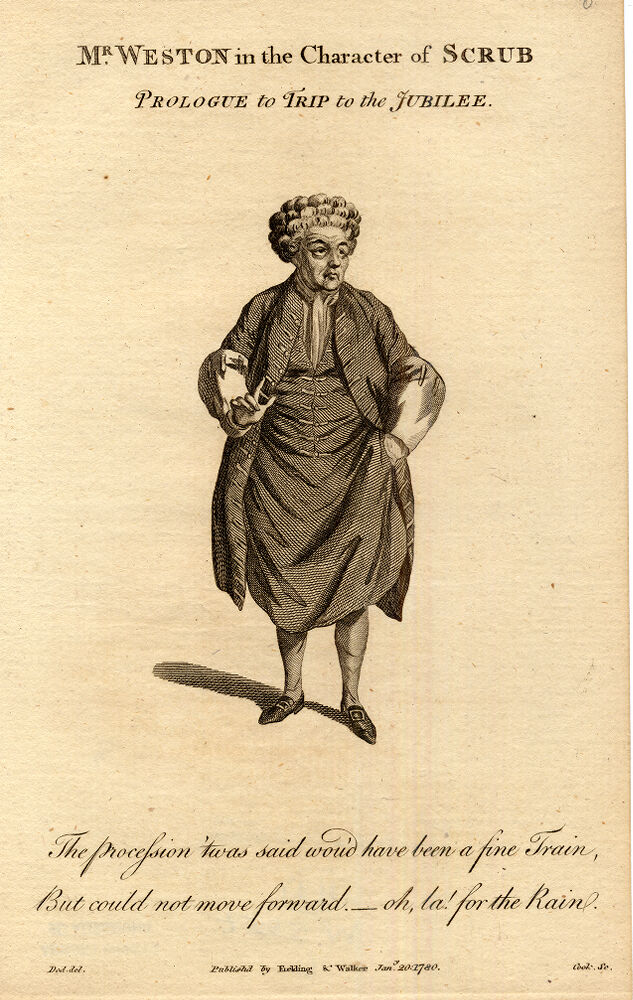
Weston as Scrub in Scrub's Trip to The Jubilee

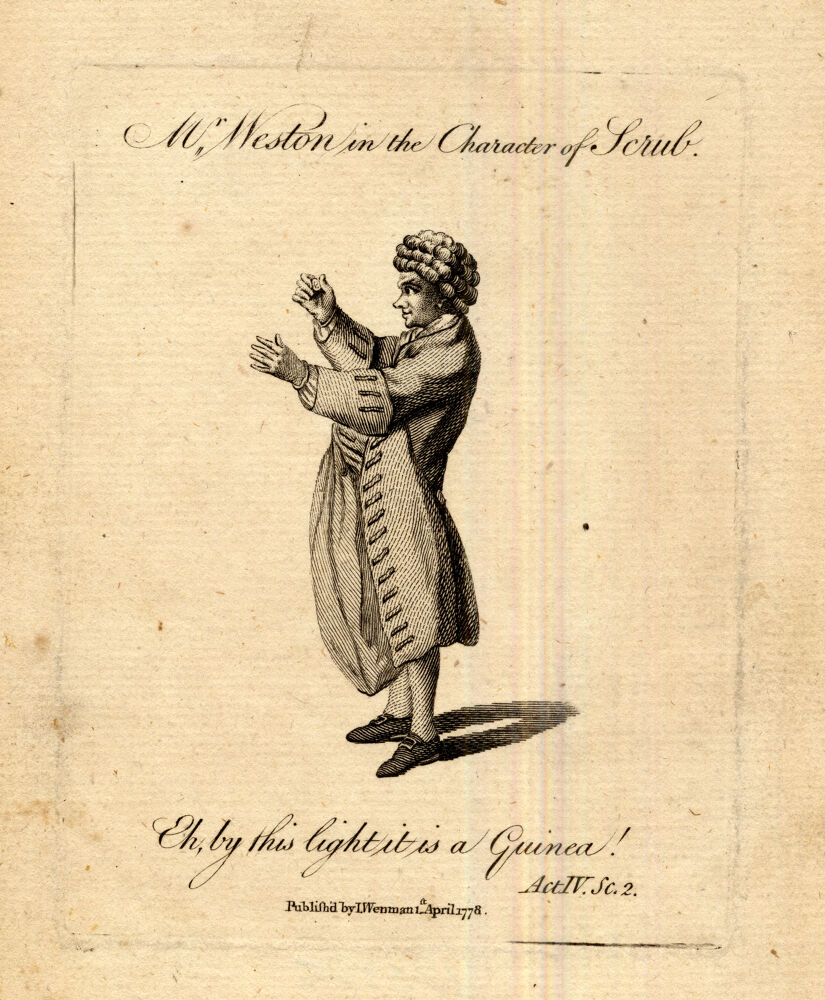
Weston as Scrub in The Beaux' Stratagem

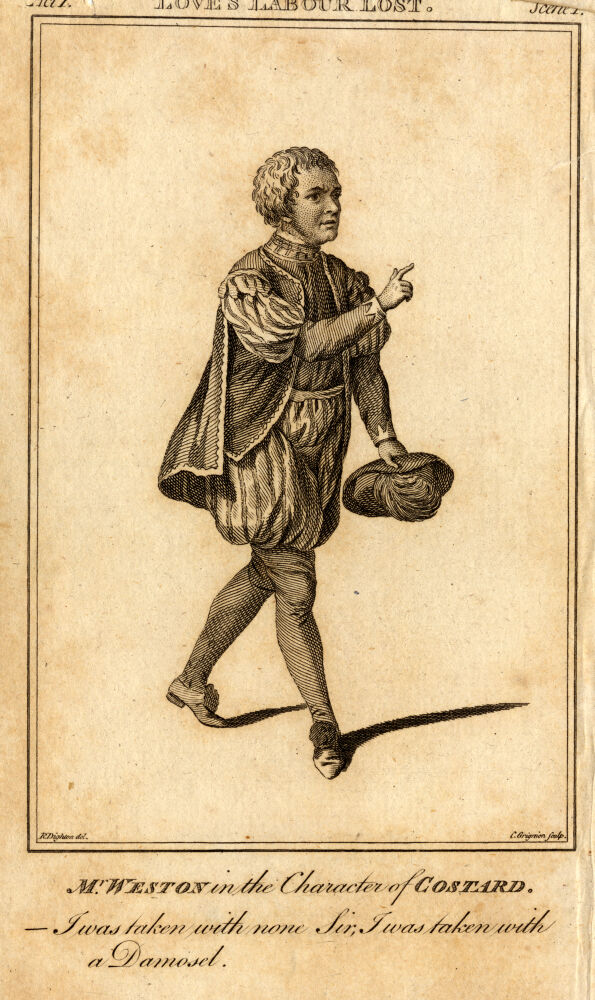
Weston as Costard in Love's Labour's Lost

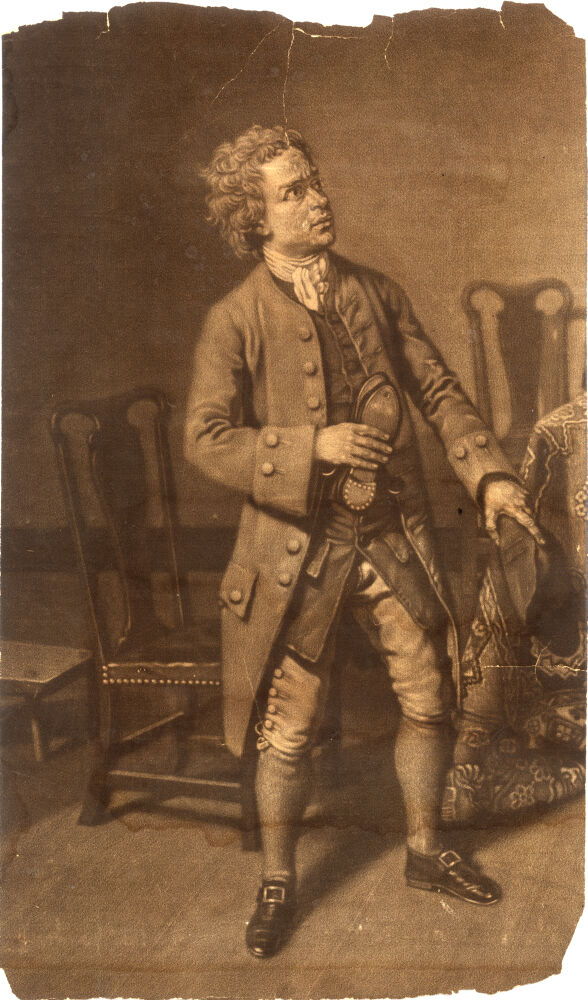
Weston as Dr. Last in The Devil on Two Sticks

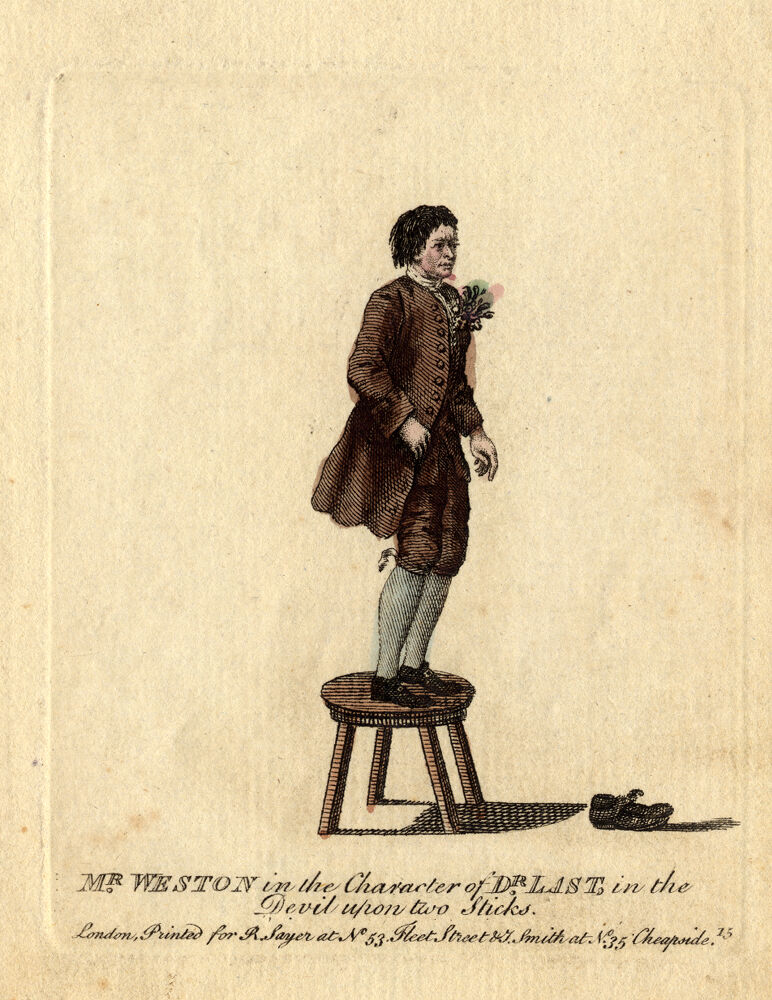
Weston as Dr. Last
