= Young's =

British pub chain

Coordinates: 51.45719°N 0.19288°W

Young & Co.'s Brewery, P.L.C.
- Type: Public limited company
- Traded as: LSE: YNGA
- Industry: Hospitality industry and alcoholic beverages
- Founded: 1831
- Founder: Charles Young and Anthony Bainbridge
- Headquarters: Wandsworth; London, SW18; United Kingdom
- Area served: London & Southeast
- Products: Public houses and beer
- Revenue: ▲£508.2 million (2026)
- Operating income: ▲£59.3 million (2026)
- Net income: ▲£28.1 million (2026)
- Website: Official website

Young & Co.'s Brewery, P.L.C., commonly known as Young's, is a British pub chain operating nearly 280 pubs.

The company was founded as a brewery in 1831 by Charles Young and Anthony Bainbridge when they purchased the Ram Brewery in Wandsworth. The company closed the Ram Brewery in 2006, and the brewing operation was transferred to a new company, Wells & Young's Brewing Company Ltd, which was a joint brewing venture with Charles Wells Brewery. Young's held 40% of the shares in the new company until the sale of its stake to Charles Wells in 2011. There is a rolling contract for Young's to take beers produced by Wells & Young's and by Marston's after it took over the Eagle Brewery in Bedford, an operation now called Carlsberg Marston's Brewing Company. Until its closure in 2006, the company's Ram Brewery in Wandsworth was claimed to be Britain's oldest brewing site in continuous operation, with a history dating back to the 1550s when a Humphrey Langridge, "beer-brewer at Wandsworth", leased the Ram pub.

The company is listed on the London Stock Exchange and is a constituent of the FTSE 250 Index.

== History ==
A Ram pub on Young's brewery site was recorded from a survey around 1550 which details the owner as Elizabeth Ridon, who leased out the premises. The first indication of brewing at the Ram are from 1576 when a Humphrey Langridge, "beer-brewer at Wandsworth" (then a village in Surrey), had his house broken into, and the thief was tried at the local assize court; this Humphrey Langridge is also recorded as being landlord of "the Rame" in 1581, and so it is surmised by Young's historian that Langridge would have been brewing at the Ram in 1576. The site of this inn is today once again the Ram Inn having been previously called The Brewery Tap then The Ram Brewery Shop & Visitors Centre. Records from 1675 show that the brewery was run by the Draper family, and in the 18th century, the Trittons purchased the brewery. It was purchased by Charles Allen Young and Anthony Fothergill Bainbridge in 1831. Since then it has been associated with the Young family.

The brewery supplied Young's public houses, in London and the area to the south-west, which still number over 200. It also sold to many other pubs and supermarkets. Beer was also exported to many European countries, Canada, the United States and Japan. The company produced three regular and a series of seasonal and occasional cask ales, keg lagers, and several filtered and pasteurised bottled beers. Young's also contract-brewed several beers for InBev, such as Courage Best and Mackeson Stout.

On 23 May 2006, the company announced that the Ram Brewery was to close and brewing was to be moved to the Eagle Brewery in Bedford, then owned by Charles Wells. Wells & Young's Brewing, with Charles Wells having a 60% stake, and Young & Co 40%, went into operation on 2 October 2006. Wells & Young's was then responsible for brewing, distributing and marketing Charles Wells's and Young & Co's brands at the jointly owned Eagle Brewery in Bedford. The company was operated at arm's length from both Young's and Charles Wells. However a combination of directors from both companies sat on the Wells & Young's Board.

Chairman John Young died on 17 September 2006, days before the closure of the brewery, whilst the final brew was being run at the Ram Brewery Wandsworth. Beer from the last brew was served at his funeral on 29 September 2006.

In June 2007, the company moved its head office from the Ram Brewery to the Copper House in Garratt Lane, Wandsworth.

On 9 August 2011, the company announced the sale of its stake in Wells & Young's Brewing Company Ltd to Charles Wells.

== Former brewery ==
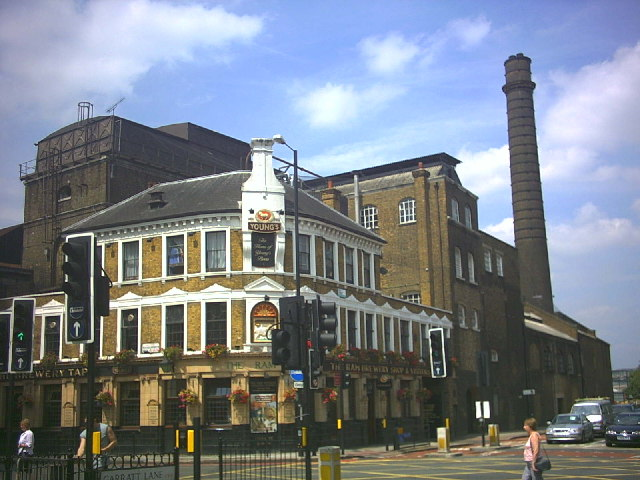
Ram Brewery in Wandsworth, shortly before closure

Young's claimed that the Ram Brewery was the oldest British brewery in continuous operation before it closed on 25 September 2006.

The new owner of the site, property company Minerva plc, hired one of the former Young's brewers, John Hatch, as site manager. One of his jobs was to keep brewing going on the site via a 'nanobrewery' set up in the old Young's laboratory. Hatch's new Ram Brewery continued to brew at least once a week in order to maintain the "oldest British brewery" claim.

In July 2013, the redevelopment of the site was announced, to provide new residential and commercial properties alongside shops, bars, restaurants and public open spaces. As part of the redevelopment, historic buildings on the site were to be retained and restored; they were to house a new micro-brewery and a museum of brewing history (in which the coppers and beam engine would be displayed). The banks of the River Wandle, which flows through the site, would also be opened up to the public as part of the new development. The Ram Brewery was home to the MasterChef kitchen between 2011 and 2014.

In November 2020 Sambrook's Brewery, formerly of Battersea, took a 25 year lease on the site to build a new microbrewery, tap room, and planned museum. The brewery became operational in March 2021 and was designated the main hub of Sambrook's brewing operation. The tap room opened in July 2021.

== Bibliography ==
- Helen Osborn, Inn and Around London. Surrey Fine Art Press. ISBN 0-9518167-0-5.
- Helen Osborn, Britain's Oldest Brewery: the story behind the success of Young's of Wandsworth, Young & Co, 1999, ISBN 0-9518167-2-1
- John Young, Acting Up, Autobiography published by The Memoir Club Durham
