= Garrat Elections =

18th century mock elections in England

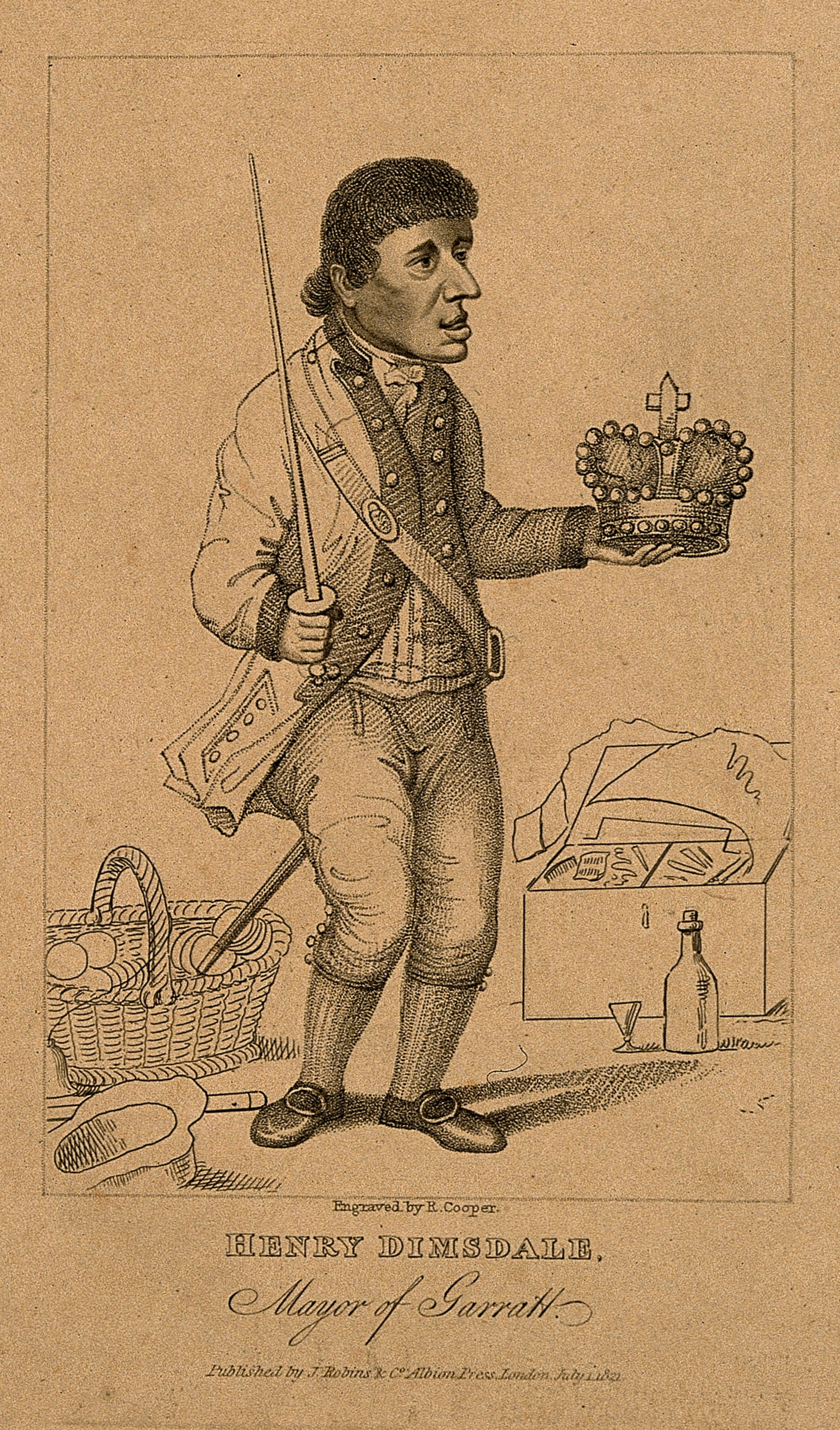
"Sir" Harry Dimsdale, a muffin seller elected as the final Mayor of Garrat in 1796

The Garrat Elections were a carnival of mock elections in Wandsworth, Surrey (now part of London), England, in the 18th century. The events were organized around 20 May and would see crowds of tens of thousands travelling five miles (8.0 km) from London to take part. The elections were held for at least fifty years before declining after the death of Mayor "Sir" Harry Dimsdale in 1796.

Grose's Classical Dictionary of the Vulgar Tongue, originally published in 1785 by Francis Grose, described the Garrat Election as:

A ludicrous ceremony, practiced every new parliament: it consists of a mock election of two members to represent the borough of Garret [sic] (a few straggling cottages, near Wandsworth, in Surrey). The qualification of a voter is, having enjoyed a woman, in the open air, within that district: the candidates are commonly fellows of low humor, who dress themselves up in a ridiculous manner. As this brings a prodigious concourse of people to Wandsworth, the publicans of that place jointly contribute to the expense, which is sometimes considerable.

== History ==
In the 17th century, Garrat was a small hamlet in the parish of Wandsworth. Its residents had met in a conclave and elected a "commons" president to exert authority over a small common. They felt that the president should hold the office of "mayor" during the parliamentary period between general elections and should be re-elected with the new one. The minor political spectacle aroused some amusement and locals ended up parodying the affair in their mock election.

The Garrat "elections" were chaired at Garratt Lane, and were popular events, with up to 80,000 attendees and sponsorship from local innkeepers and pub keepers who profited from the occasion. People put forth unusual candidates to parody the features of the real election, with the successful candidate being "the most deformed and stupid". Candidates would deliver speeches with promises and appeals to sentiment, making pledges such as "that they will lower the prices of gin, bread, beer, &c.; make old women bishops; and that they will not accept any place in the House".

The fame of the Garratt elections was spread by Samuel Foote's 1763 farce, The Mayor of Garret, and from 1768 candidates often came from London and its surroundings rather than just the Wandsworth area.

After the death of Mayor Harry Dimsdale towards the end of the 18th century, the festival began to lose its drive and innkeepers no longer agreed to pay the expenses. An 1826 attempt to revive the event failed.

== Mayors and candidates ==
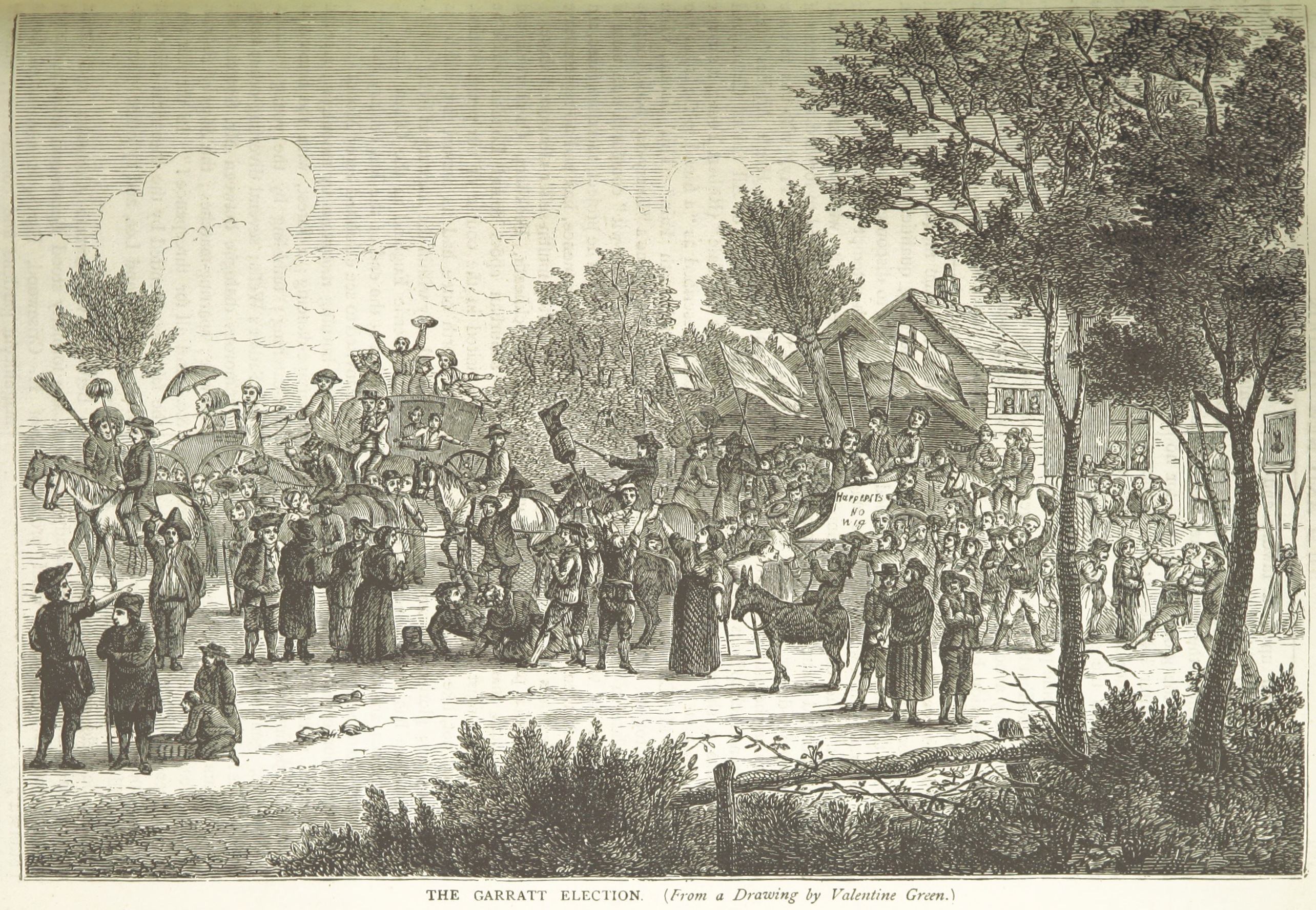
The Garrat Election

There is no record of the identity of the candidates before 1747. At that particular year, the "clerk and recorder" from a nonexistent town hall issued notification of election between Squire Blowmedown and Squire Gubbins (waterman and pubkeeper, respectively, in their day-to-day jobs). Both candidates gave out handbills where they praised their own merits and mocked those of their opponent, imitating political leaflets of the day. Same two candidates attended the next election in 1754, again abusing each other and their supporters in their handbills.

Year 1761 saw the number of candidates rise to nine; in addition to previous two there were Sir John Crambo, Kit Noisy (waterman), Lord Lapstone (shoemaker), Lord Paxford, Lord Twankum (cobbler), Lord Wedge and Beau Silvester. The candidates elicited flowering elocutions praising their own efforts, promising prosperity if they were to be elected and threatening impending disaster if their opponents should be elected instead. Beau Silvester merited himself with resisting the extra tax on ale and giving orders to increase the number of local pubs.

In 1763 candidates Lord Twankum, Kit Noisy and Sir John Crambo mocked each other in electoral contest. In 1768 there were seven candidates; Lord Twankum, Sir Christopher Dashem, Sir George Comefirst, Sir William Airey, Sir William Bellows, one "Batt from the Workhouse", and Sir John Harper who ended up being the most popular in the following elections. Lady Twankum promised an opulent party for the entertainment of the populace. 1775 election introduced Sir William Blaize, "Nephew to the late Lord Twankum" and Sir Christopher Dashem.

The 1781 election again had nine candidates; old hands Sir John Harper, Sir Christopher Dashwood, and Sir William Blaize and the new ones Sir Buggy Bates (chimney-sweep), Sir John Gnawpost, Sir Thomas Nameless, Sir William Swallowtail (basketmaker), Sir Thomas Tubbs (waterman) and Sir Jeffrey Dunstan (wigseller). The latter proved to be the most popular ever in the following elections due to his wit, small size and grotesque and unkempt appearance. Swallowtail had come to the poll in a wicker-chariot of his own design and preceded by hand-bell players. Dashwood was pulled around in a boat. Swallowtail and Buggy Bates were blamed of having government contracts, of baskets and soot, respectively. Sir John Harper and Sir Jeffrey Dunstan were "returned to parliament".

In 1785 elections Sir Jeffrey Dunstan was left without opposition when Sir John Harper died. In 1796 the new candidate Sir Harry Dimsdale won but he died before the next election.

== See also ==
- Mock election in the King's Bench Prison: In July 1827, the inmates of the King's Bench Prison, in Borough, South London, organised a fantastical mock hustings, to elect an MP to represent "Tenterden" (a slang name for the prison) in Parliament.
- Derby Day (the annual Epsom Derby and fair) on the North Downs.
- Garratt Lane remnant of the former small neighbourhood within present-day Earlsfield, the London Borough of Wandsworth, London.
