= The Mayor of Garret =

1763 play

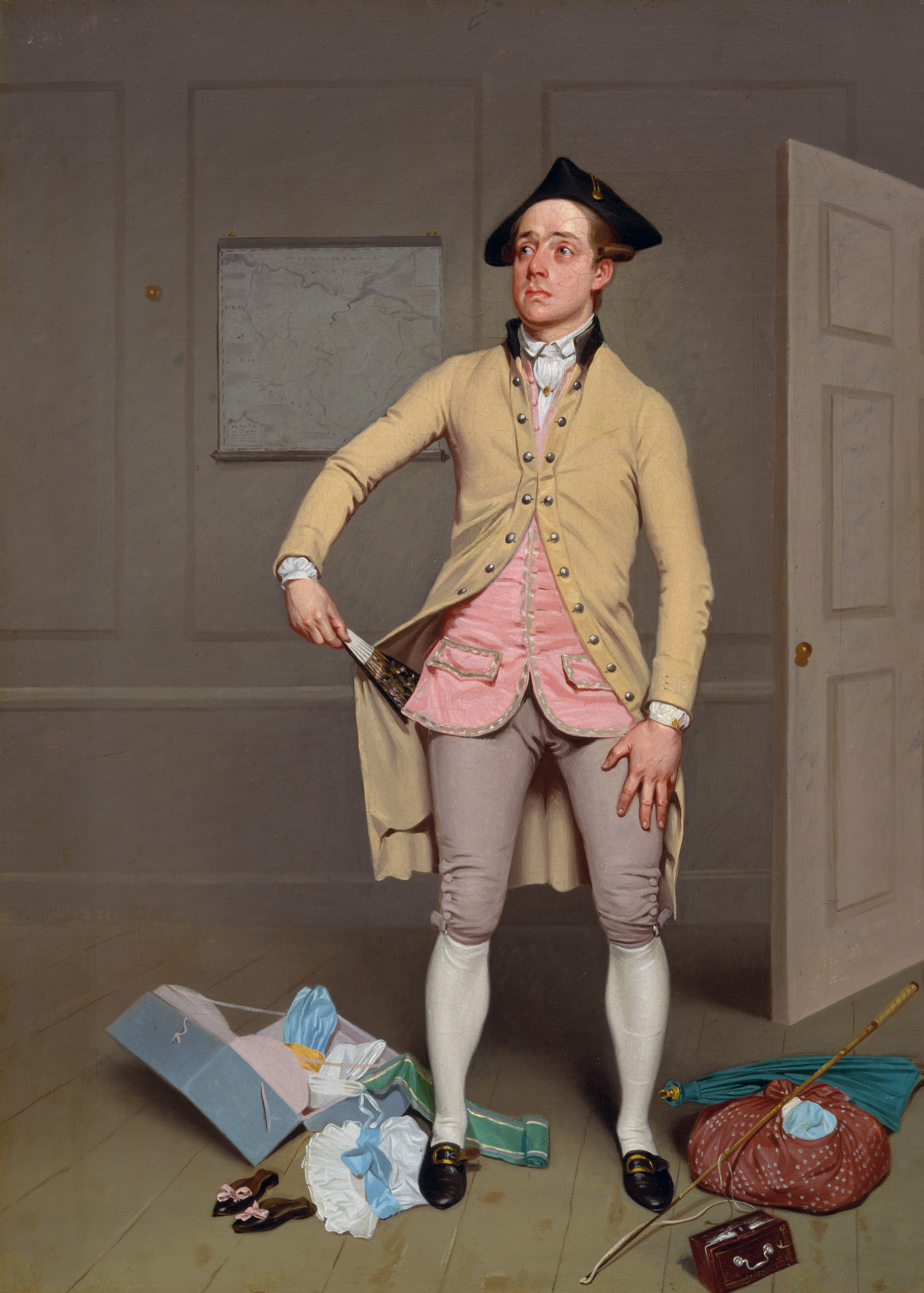
Samuel Thomas Russell as Jerry Sneak in The Mayor of Garret

The Mayor of Garret (also spelled The Mayor of Garratt) is a farce by Samuel Foote, set during a fictionalised version of the Garrat Elections carnival that took place in Surrey, England, in the 18th century.

== Opening performance ==
The play opened on Monday, the 20th of June, 1763 at the Theatre Royal Haymarket, where it ran until the 3rd of September, 1763. It was first published in 1764.

The play's original cast featured low comic actor Thomas Weston, who had been with Foote's troupe since 1760, in the part of Jerry Sneak, while Foote himself played the Major. The affable and pathetic character of Sneak was very popular, so much so that Sid Sondergard wrote in 1989 that "his name passed into the vernacular in the same manner as the modern cartoon character, Caspar Milquetoast".

== Plot summary ==
=== Act one ===
Lint, a doctor, arrives to see Sir Jacob; it is the day of the Garrat elections, and Lint is prepared to deal with the injuries to result from the carnival. They debate quack medicine. The argument escalates, and Sir Jacob turns Lint out of the house. Major Sturgeon arrives. The Major describes a battle, and discusses the merits of various companies with Sir Jacob. However, he had hoped to visit with Sir Jacob's two married daughters. The Major is to act as magistrate for the election of the new mayor; he and Sir Jacob expect many oaths from the townspeople today. Roger, a servant, enters, and announces that the people outside are suggesting a candidate for the position of mayor. Sturgeon leaves, to Sir Jacob's comment that “the fish is got out of his element.” He returns with Mrs. Sneak, one of Sir Jacob's daughters, and her husband, who promptly leaves again. Mrs. Sneak expresses her displeasure with Sneak, calling him "Meek! a Mushroom! a Milk-Sop!" Sir Jacob leaves, and Mrs. Sneak and the Major flirt. Sneak returns just as the Major begins to kiss Mrs. Sneak's hand. She leaves; Sneak and the Major discuss her merits. Bruin and his wife (Mrs. Sneak's sister) enter. The Major quickly leaves to "attend to the lady [Mrs. Sneak] instantly", with Sneak's encouragement. Mrs. Bruin is thoroughly dominated by her husband; she exits at his orders, and Sneak expresses his envy at Bruin's control, as Mrs. Sneak allows him only two shillings a week for his own pocket-money. Bruin agrees to help Sneak beat Mrs. Sneak, but she calls for him, causing Sneak loses his will; he comments "what a sad life do I lead".

=== Act two ===
The mob gathers under the window. Sir Jacob suggests that the common people in the mob have the potential to be great orators: "you will meet with materials to make a Sylla, a Cicero, a Solon, or a Caesar". All exit. The mob enters, with Heel-Tap at their head. Heel-Tap presides over the election, as various candidates' proposals are read aloud. Sneak goes after the Major and Mrs. Sneak, who have disappeared again. One candidate, Matthew Mug, presents his arguments for how to improve the town, but Heel-Tap refuses a bribe and denounces him. Sir Jacob's family returns; he chastises Bruin for his harsh treatment of his wife. Sneak rushes in, having discovered that the Major and Mrs. Sneak are in the locked summer-house. Heel-Tap enters, and announces that Sneak has been elected mayor. Mrs. Sneak enters, and Sneak stands up to her, announcing that he will begin to live his life as he chooses: "if some folks go into gardens with Majors, mayhap other people will go into garrets with maids." She abuses Sneak, but he and Bruin have the upper hand. The Major enters. Bruin makes Mrs. Sneak cry and fights with the Major; Sneak capitulates to his wife's sobs. Mrs Sneak demands that another person be elected mayor. Sir Jacob suggests that Heel-Tap act as the locum tenens (deputy).

== Influence from Restoration comedy ==
Mary Megie Belden asserted in 1929 that The Mayor of Garratt had much more in common with comedies of the Restoration era, than with contemporary 18th-century plays, observing that "Sneak and Bruin with their respective wives have been easily recognised as descendants of Bisket and Fribble with their respective wives in Epsom Wells [written by Thomas Shadwell], and the scene where Sneak peeps through the key-hole of the summer-house in Act 2 was doubtless suggested by a scene in the same play."
