= 1768 in literature =

This article contains information about the literary events and publications of 1768.

== Events ==
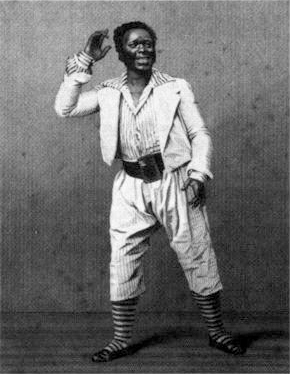
Ira Aldridge as Mungo in The Padlock

- March – John Wilkes, returning from exile in France, is elected to the Parliament of Great Britain.
- May 10 – John Wilkes is imprisoned for attacking King George III of Great Britain in print.
- July 28 – Thomas Gray succeeds Lawrence Brockett as Regis Professor of History at the University of Cambridge.
- December 12 – Walter Butler, 16th Earl of Ormonde, father of Lady Eleanor Butler, inherits Kilkenny Castle in Ireland. This brings about the first meeting of the Ladies of Llangollen.
- unknown dates
  - John Murray (publisher) is established in London.
  - The Theatre Royal, Bath (Old Orchard Street Theatre) and Theatre Royal, Norwich assume these titles on being granted Royal Patents, making them officially England's only legal provincial theaters.
  - The Leeds Library is founded, becoming the oldest surviving subscription library of its type in Britain.

== New books ==
=== Fiction ===
- John Cleland – The Woman of Honour (attributed)
- Alexander Dow (translated) – Tales Translated from the Persian of Inatulla of Delhi
- Voltaire – La Princesse de Babylone
- José Francisco de Isla – Historia del famoso predicador fray Gerundio de Campazas, alias Zotes (second part)
- Anonymous – Fumoto no iro (Japanese: 麓の色, romanized: Sex in the Foothills)

=== Children ===
- Christopher Smart – Parables of Our Lord and Saviour Jesus Christ (verse)

=== Drama ===
- Isaac Bickerstaffe
  - Lionel and Clarissa
  - The Hypocrite
  - The Padlock
- Alexander Dow – Zingis
- Samuel Foote – The Devil on Two Sticks
- Oliver Goldsmith – The Good-Natur'd Man
- John Hoole – Cyrus
- Hugh Kelly – False Delicacy
- Arthur Murphy – Zenobia
- Michel-Jean Sedaine – La gageure imprévue
- Heinrich Wilhelm von Gerstenberg – Ugolino
- Horace Walpole – The Mysterious Mother (published)
- William Shakespeare, ed. Edward Capell – Mr. William Shakespeare His Comedies, Histories and Tragedies

=== Poetry ===
- Isaac Hawking Browne – Poems
- Thomas Gray – Poems
- Richard Jago – Labour and Genius
- Edward Jerningham – Amabella
- Mary Wortley Montagu – Poetical Works
- Henry James Pye – Elegies
- Alexander Ross – The Fortunate Shepherdess
- Christopher Smart – The Parables of Our Lord and Saviour Jesus Christ
- William Wilkie – Fables

=== Non-fiction ===
- Abraham Booth – The Reign of Grace
- James Boswell – An Account of Corsica
- William Gilpin – An Essay upon Prints, containing remarks upon the principles of picturesque beauty
- Oliver Goldsmith – The Present State of the British Empire in Europe, America, Africa, and Asia
- Richard Gough – Anecdotes of British Topography
- Joseph Priestley – An Essay on the First Principles of Government
- Tobias Smollett – The Present State of all Nations
- Laurence Sterne – A Sentimental Journey through France and Italy
- Gilbert Stuart – An Historical Dissertation Concerning the Antiquity of the English Constitution
- Emanuel Swedenborg – Deliciae Sapientiae de Amore Conjugiali
- Abraham Tucker (as Edward Search) – The Light of Nature Pursued
- Horace Walpole – Historic Doubts on the Life and Reign of King Richard III
- Arthur Young – A Six Weeks' Tour Through the Southern Counties of England and Wales

== Births ==
- March 22 – Melesina Trench, Irish-born writer and socialite (died 1827)
- September 4 – François-René de Chateaubriand, French writer and diplomat (died 1848
- November 18 – Zacharias Werner, German religious poet (died 1823)
- November 21 – Friedrich Schleiermacher, German theologian (died 1834)

== Deaths ==
- March 1 – Hermann Samuel Reimarus, German philosopher (born 1694)
- March 18 – Laurence Sterne, Irish-born novelist and cleric (born 1713)
- April 9 – Sarah Fielding, English novelist and children's author (born 1710)
- May 30 – Eggert Ólafsson, Icelandic writer and linguist (drowned, born 1726)
- July 4 – Willem van Haren, Dutch poet (born 1710)
- August 20 – Joseph Spence, English memoirist and professor of poetry (born 1699)
- November 25 – Alexander Russell, Scottish physician and naturalist (born c. 1715)
- December 20 – Carlo Innocenzio Maria Frugoni, Italian poet (born 1692)
