= Richard Wroughton =

British actor (1748–1822)

- Richard Wroughton as The Black Prince.
- Born: 1748
- Died: 1822 (aged 73–74)
- Occupation: actor

Richard Wroughton (1748–1822), was an actor, who worked mainly in Covent Garden (now the Royal Opera house) and Drury Lane (now the Theatre Royal), and occasionally in the city of his birth, Bath.

== Acting at Covent Garden ==
He was born in 1748, and came to London, followed by a young milliner who had fallen in love with him, who nursed him through a severe illness, and whom he married. His first appearance was made at Covent Garden on 24 September 1768 as Zaphna in ‘Mahomet,’ and not apparently in Altamont in ‘The Fair Penitent’ (acted on the 12th), as all his biographers say. He was seen during the season as Tressel in ‘Richard III,’ Nerestan in ‘Zara,’ Creon in ‘Medea,’ Altamont, for his benefit, on 4 May 1769, and George Barnwell.

He was slow in ripening, and his early performances gave little promise. By dint of sheer hard work he developed, however, into a good actor. During the seventeen years in which he remained at Covent Garden he played the principal parts in comedy and many important characters in tragedy and romantic drama. These included Dick in the ‘Miller of Mansfield,’ Frederick in ‘The Miser,’ Polydore in the ‘Orphan,’ Cyrus, Moneses in ‘Tamerlane,’ Claudio in ‘Measure for Measure,’ Guiderius, Colonel Briton in the ‘Wonder,’ Marcus in ‘Cato,’ Theodosius, Colonel Tamper in ‘Deuce is in him,’ Florizel in ‘The Winter's Tale,’ Bonario in ‘Volpone,’ Sebastian in ‘Twelfth Night,’ Buckingham in ‘Henry VIII,’ Bellamy in ‘Suspicious Husband,’ Richmond in ‘Richard III,’ Younger Worthy in ‘Love's Last Shift,’ Lord Hardy in ‘Funeral,’ Poins, Dolabella in ‘All for Love,’ Myrtle in ‘The Conscious Lovers.’

=== Acting in Liverpool ===
In the summers of 1772, 1773, and subsequent years he was in Liverpool, where he played, with other parts, Lear, King John, Henry V, Antony in ‘Love for Love,’ Romeo, Othello, Leontes, and Lord Townly.

=== Return to Covent Garden ===
Back at Covent Garden, he was seen as Flaminius in ‘Herod and Mariamne,’ Shore in ‘Jane Shore,’ Alonzo in the ‘Revenge,’ Phocion in ‘The Grecian Daughter,’ Laertes, Pedro in ‘Much Ado About Nothing,’ Oakly in ‘The Jealous Wife,’ Juba in ‘Cato,’ Aimwell in ‘The Beaux' Stratagem,’ Lord Randolph in ‘Douglas,’ Lovemore in ‘Way to keep him,’ Bassanio, Amphitryon, Castalio in the ‘Orphan,’ Fainall in ‘The Way of the World,’ Romeo, Sir George Airy, Henry V, Hotspur, Kitely, Banquo, Ford, Tancred, Archer, Lear, Young Mirabel, Othello, Charles I, Wellborn in ‘A New Way to Pay Old Debts,’ Jaffier, Proteus in ‘The Two Gentlemen of Verona,’ Darnley, Iachimo, Truewit in ‘Silent Woman,’ Colonel Standard, Evander, Plain Dealer, and Apemantus.

Among very many original parts which Wroughton enacted at Covent Garden, only the following call for mention: Prince Henry in ‘Henry II, King of England,’ by John Bancroft (dramatist) or Mountfort, on 1 May 1773; Lord Lovemore in William Kenrick's ‘Duellist’ on 20 Nov.; Elidurus in William Mason's ‘Caractacus’ on 6 December 1776; Earl of Somerset in ‘Sir Thomas Overbury,’ altered from Savage by Woodfall, 1 February 1777; Douglas in Hannah More's ‘Percy,’ 10 December. This was one of Wroughton's best parts. About this time he seems to have joined Arnold in the proprietorship of Sadler's Wells Theatre, but he sold his share some twelve years later in 1790. He continued at Covent Garden as Orlando in Hannah More's The Fatal Falsehood, 6 May 1778; Sir George Touchwood in Mrs. Cowley's ‘Belle's Stratagem,’ 22 February 1780; Raymond in Robert Jephson's ‘Count of Narbonne,’ 17 November 1781, and Don Carlos in Mrs. Cowley's ‘Bold Stroke for a Husband,’ 25 February 1783.

== Acting at Drury Lane ==
In 1786–7 Wroughton disappeared from the bills, his parts at Covent Garden being assigned to Farren, and on 29 September 1787, as Douglas in ‘Percy,’ he made his first appearance at Drury Lane. For the time being he replaced John Palmer (1742?–1798), but he practically remained at Drury Lane for the rest of his career. He played with the Drury Lane company at the Haymarket in 1792–3 Charles Surface, Clerimont, and other parts, and at Drury Lane enlarged his repertory by many new characters, including the Ghost in ‘Hamlet’ and Hamlet himself, King in ‘Henry IV’ and in ‘Richard III,’ Antonio in ‘The Merchant of Venice,’ the Stranger in ‘Douglas,’ Leontes, Jaques, Careless in ‘The Double Dealer,’ Jaques, Tullus Aufidius, Macduff, Moody in ‘Country Girl,’ Sciolto, Belarius, Kent and Edgar in ‘Lear,’ Sir Peter Teazle, and Leonato. Most conspicuous among his original characters were Gomez in Bertie Greathead's ‘Regent,’ 1 April 1788; Polycarp in Richard Cumberland's ‘Impostors,’ 26 January 1789; Periander to the Ariadne of Mrs. Siddons in Arthur Murphy's The Rival Sisters 18 March 1793; Charles Ratcliffe in Cumberland's ‘Jew,’ 8 April 1794; Odoarto Galotti in ‘Emilia Galotti’ translated by Thompson from Lessing, 28 October; Lord Sensitive in Cumberland's ‘First Love,’ 12 May 1795; Fitzharding in George Colman's ‘Iron Chest,’ 12 March 1796; Orasmyn in Miss Lee's ‘Almeyda,’ 20 April, Mandeville in Frederick Reynolds's The Will 19 April 1797; and Earl Reginald in ‘Monk’ Lewis's ‘Castle Spectre,’ 14 December.

== Retirement ==
In 1798 he retired from the stage and settled in Bath, but in 1800, on the death of John Palmer and the illness of Aikin, in answer to an invitation of the Drury Lane management he came back, and was seen in a new series of parts including: Don Pedro in William Godwin's Antonio, 13 December 1800; Provost in William Sotheby's ‘Julian and Agnes,’ 25 April 1801; Casimir Rubenski in Dimond's ‘Hero of the North,’ 19 February 1803; Maurice in Cobb's ‘Wife of Two Husbands,’ 1 November; Sir Rowland English in Francis Ludlow Holt's The Land We Live In, 29 December 1804; Balthazar in John Tobin's ‘Honeymoon,’ 31 January 1805; Conrad in Theodore Hook's ‘Tekeli,’ 24 November 1806; and Cœlestino in ‘Monk’ Lewis's ‘Venoni,’ 1 December 1808. His return did little good to his reputation, and before he finally quit the stage he was completely worn out.

On 9 March 1815 Wroughton gave to the stage an alteration of ‘Richard II’ with additions from other plays of Shakespeare, in which he did not act. On 10 July 1815 he acted his old part of Withers in Kenney's ‘World.’ This was his last performance.

Wroughton was what Michael Kelly calls him, ‘a sterling, sound, and sensible performer.’ His person was bad, he was knock-kneed, his face was round and inexpressive, and his voice was not good. He had, however, an easy and unembarrassed carriage and deportment, was never offensive, and, though he rarely reached greatness, seldom sank into insipidity or dulness. He was always perfect in his parts, indefatigable in industry, and wholly free from affectation. Wroughton was a close friend of Bannister; they were spoken of as Pylades and Orestes.

A portrait of Wroughton by Samuel De Wilde, as Sir John Restless in All in the Wrong, was in the Mathews collection in the Garrick Club. A mezzotint portrait by Robert Laurie after Robert Dighton was published in 1779, and there are several portraits in character in John Bell's British Theatre.

== Personal ==
On 7 February 1822, at the reputed age of seventy-four, he died in Howland Street, London, leaving behind him a widow, and was buried in St. George's, Bloomsbury.

== Selected roles ==
- Cherinthus in Timanthes by John Hoole (1770)
- Palermo in Clementina by Hugh Kelly (1771)
- Lord Lovemore in The Duellist by William Kenrick (1773)
- Malvil in Know Your Own Mind by Arthur Murphy (1777)
- Earl Douglas in Percy by Hannah More (1777)
- Orlando in The Fatal Falsehood by Hannah More (1779)
- Sir George Touchwood in The Belle's Stratagem by Hannah Cowley (1780)
- Raymond in The Count of Narbonne by Robert Jephson (1781)
- Belville in Which is the Man? by Hannah Cowley (1782)
- Montgomerey in The Walloons by Richard Cumberland (1782)
- Don Carlos in A Bold Stroke for a Husband by Hannah Cowley (1783)
- Captain Dorner in The Mysterious Husband by Richard Cumberland (1783)
- Carlton in More Ways Than One by Hannah Cowley (1783)
- Captain Douglas in Fashionable Levities by Leonard MacNally (1785)
- Charles in The New Peerage by Harriet Lee (1787)
- Gomez in The Regent by Bertie Greatheed (1788)
- Baron in False Appearances by Henry Seymour Conway (1789)
- Polycarp in The Impostors by Richard Cumberland (1789)
- Governor of Barcelona in Marcella by William Hayley (1789)
- Periander, King of Naxos in The Rival Sisters by Arthur Murphy (1793)
- Sir Harry Cecil in False Colours by Edward Morris (1793)
- Charles Ratcliffe in The Jew by Richard Cumberland (1794)
- Lord Sensitive in First Love by Richard Cumberland (1795)
- Orasmyn in Almeyda, Queen of Granada by Sophia Lee (1796)
- Fitzharding in The Iron Chest by George Colman the Younger (1796)
- Reginald in The Castle Spectre by Matthew Lewis 1797)
- Mandeville in The Will by Frederick Reynolds (1797)
- Sir Guy Taunton in Knave or Not? by Thomas Holcroft (1798)
- Don Pedro in Antonio by William Godwin (1800)
- Provost in Julian and Agnes by William Sotheby (1801)
- Stewart in Hear Both Sides by Thomas Holcroft (1803)
- Sir Mathew Moribund in The Sailor's Daughter by Richard Cumberland (1804)
- Sir Rowland England in The Land We Live In by Francis Ludlow Holt (1804)
- Sir Felix Mordant in The School for Friends by Marianne Chambers (1805)
