= Richard Hurst (actor) =

British stage actor

Richard Hurst (died 1805) was a British stage actor.

He appeared in a number of London and provincial theatres during a lengthy career. From 1765 to 1780 he was a member of the Drury Lane company under the management of David Garrick and then Richard Brinsley Sheridan. In 1769 he appeared in Garrick's The Jubilee, a celebration of William Shakespeare.

== Selected roles ==
- Tigranes in Zenobia by Arthur Murphy (1768)
- Sidasco in Zingis by Alexander Dow (1768)
- Arcas in The Grecian Daughter by Arthur Murphy (1772)
- Corea in Braganza by Robert Jephson (1775)
- Raymond in The Battle of Hastings by Richard Cumberland (1778)
- Asciano in The Law of Lombardy by Robert Jephson (1779)

== Bibliography ==
- Highfill, Philip H, Burnim, Kalman A. & Langhans, Edward A. A Biographical Dictionary of Actors, Actresses, Musicians, Dancers, Managers, and Other Stage Personnel in London, 1660-1800: Volume VIII. SIU Press, 1973.
- The Plays of David Garrick: Volume II, 1767-1775. SIU Press, 1980.
