= Elizabeth Satchell =

English actress

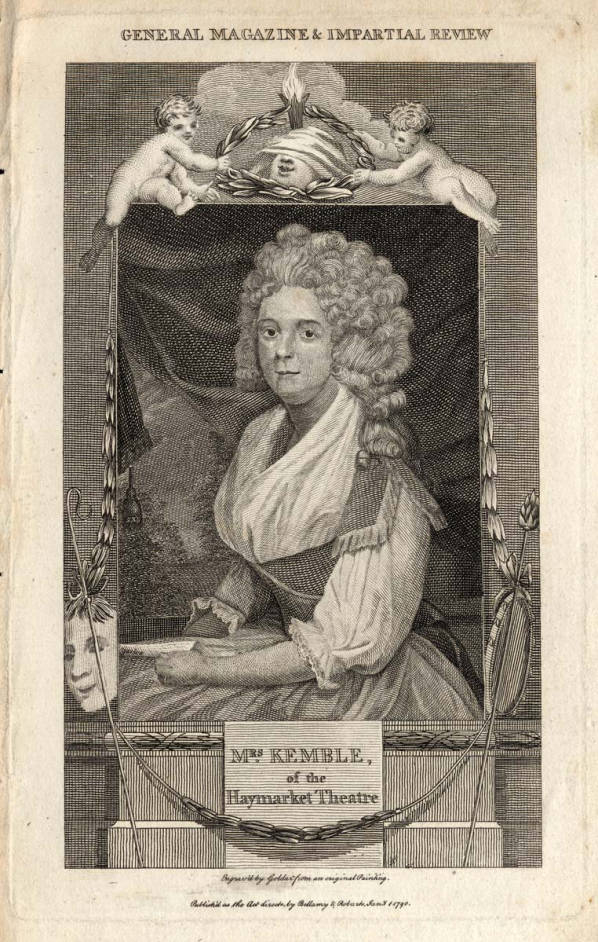
Elizabeth Satchell by John Goldar

Elizabeth Kemble (née Satchell; 1763 – 20 January 1841) was an English actress. From her marriage she was billed as Mrs. Kemble on playbills.

== Life ==
Elizabeth Satchell was born in London, and she was a talented performer when she married Stephen Kemble, of the Kemble family, in 1783. They acted together for several years both in London and in the provincial circuits. She also wrote a pastoral, Philander and Rose; or, the Bridal Day, which was produced in Manchester on 25 April 1785.

Satchell outlived her husband by 19 years. Her most famous role was Yarico from the opera Inkle and Yarico, for which she was considered "universally" to be the best "ever seen". She died near Durham.

== Reputation ==
Theatre manager Tate Wilkinson declared that next to Susannah Maria Cibber, Elizabeth Satchell was the best Ophelia he ever saw.

The editor of Blackwood's Magazine reported:

"In all the parts she played she was impassioned; and all good judges who remember her will agree with us in thinking that she was an actress, not only of talent but of genius."

James Boaden was enthusiastic in her praise. In 1792, the Thespian Magazine reported that "[Satchell] summons the resistless tear of compassion into the eyes of the most rugged and insensible – and while sympathy and feeling shall hold a place in the human heart, her representation of Yarrico [sic] will be attended with delight, and remembered with the most unbounded admiration.”

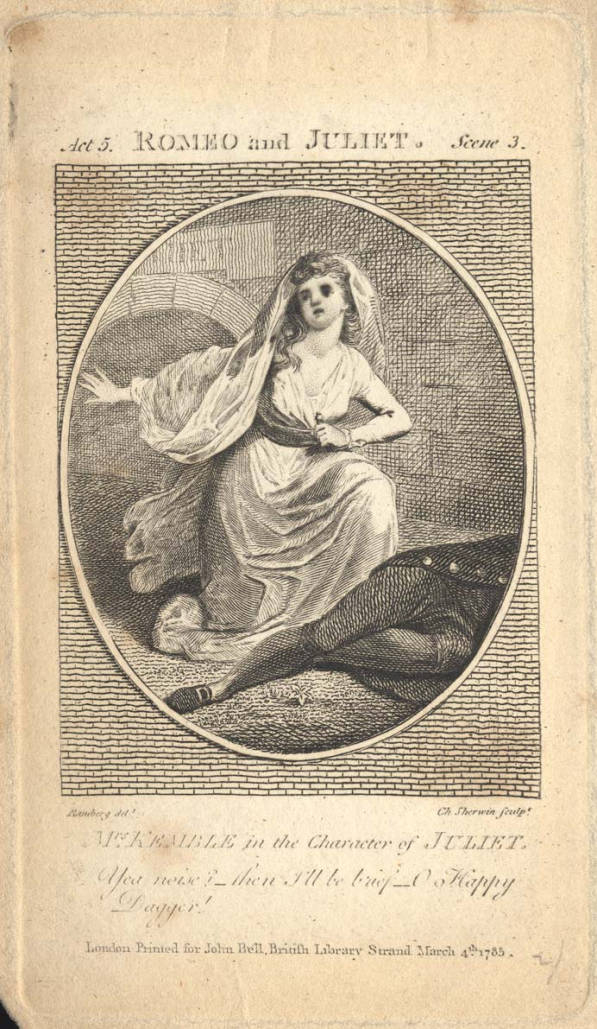
Elizabeth Satchell by Johann Heinrich Ramberg

== Selected roles ==
- Adelaide in The Count of Narbonne by Robert Jephson (1781)
- Agnes in The Walloons by Richard Cumberland (1782)
- Julia in Which is the Man? by Hannah Cowley (1782)
- Marianne in The Mysterious Husband by Richard Cumberland (1783)
- Yarico in Inkle and Yarico by George Colman the Younger (1787)
- Vimonda in Vimonda by Andrew Macdonald (1787)
- Adelaide in The Prisoner at Large by John O'Keeffe (1788)
- Harriet in Ways and Means by George Colman the Younger (1788)
- Lady Classick in The Married Man by Elizabeth Inchbald (1789)
- Julia in The Surrender of Calais by George Colman the Younger (1791)
- Eleanor in Next Door Neighbours by Elizabeth Inchbald (1791)
- Kitty Barleycorn in The London Hermit by John O'Keeffe (1793)
- Rosolia in Zorinski by Thomas Morton (1795)
- Celestina in Don Pedro by Richard Cumberland (1796)

== Links ==
- Dictionary of National Biography
- Encyclopædia Britannica
