= John Hayman Packer =

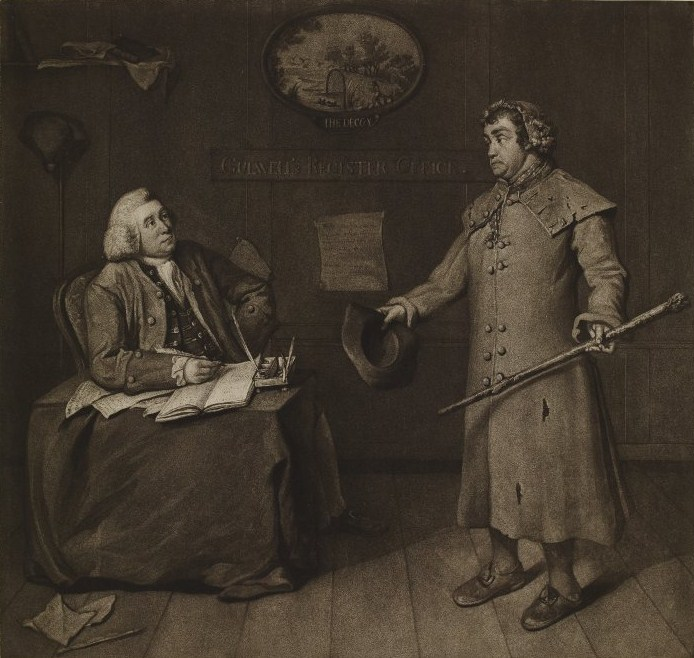
John Moody (left) and John Hayman Packer (right) in The Register Office by Joseph Reed, 1773 engraving

John Hayman Packer (12 March 1730 – 16 September 1806) was an actor for David Garrick's company at Drury Lane. Originally a saddler, he created the character Freeman in James Townley's High Life Below Stairs (1759). His parts were usually minor and, late in life, "as a rule" old men in tragedies and sentimental comedies.

== Selected roles ==
- Freeman in High Life Below Stairs by James Townley (1759)
- Lucius in The Siege of Aquileia by John Home (1760)
- Young Bellmont in All in the Wrong by Arthur Murphy (1761)
- Don Roderigo in Elvira by David Mallet (1763)
- Wellford in The Dupe by Frances Sheridan (1763)
- Sir John Lambert in The Hypocrite by Isaac Bickerstaffe (1768)
- Aunac in Zingis by Alexander Dow (1768)
- Zopiron in Zenobia by Arthur Murphy (1768)
- Captain Dudley in The West Indian by Richard Cumberland (1771)
- Greek Herald in The Grecian Daughter by Arthur Murphy (1772)
- Doctor Goodman in The Maid of Kent by Francis Godolphin Waldron (1773)
- Otanes in Sethona by Alexander Dow (1774)
- Stalpleton in The Choleric Man by Richard Cumberland (1774)
- Ramirez in Braganza by Robert Jephson (1775)
- Rinaldo in The Law of Lombardy by Robert Jephson (1779)
- Ali in The Fair Circassian by Samuel Jackson Pratt (1781)
- Thestor in The Royal Suppliants by John Delap (1781)
- Marlow in The Metamorphosis by William Jackson (1783)
- Gyfford in The Carmelite by Richard Cumberland (1784)
- Duke of Genoa in Julia by Robert Jephson (1787)
- Medley in The New Peerage by Harriet Lee (1787)
- Gerbin in The Regent by Bertie Greatheed (1788)
- Davison in Mary, Queen of Scots by John St John (1789)
- Archon in The Rival Sisters by Arthur Murphy (1793)
- Millden in The Wedding Day by Elizabeth Inchbald (1794)
- Leofric in Edwy and Elgiva by Fanny Burney (1795)
- David Duncan in The Last of the Family by Richard Cumberland (1797)
- Allan in The Castle Spectre by Matthew Gregory Lewis (1797)
- Old Copsley in The Will by Frederick Reynolds (1797)
- Blaise in The Castle of Montval by Thomas Sedgwick Whalley (1799)
- Prior in Julian and Agnes by William Sotheby (1801)
