= William Erskine, Lord Kinneder =

Scottish advocate and scholar

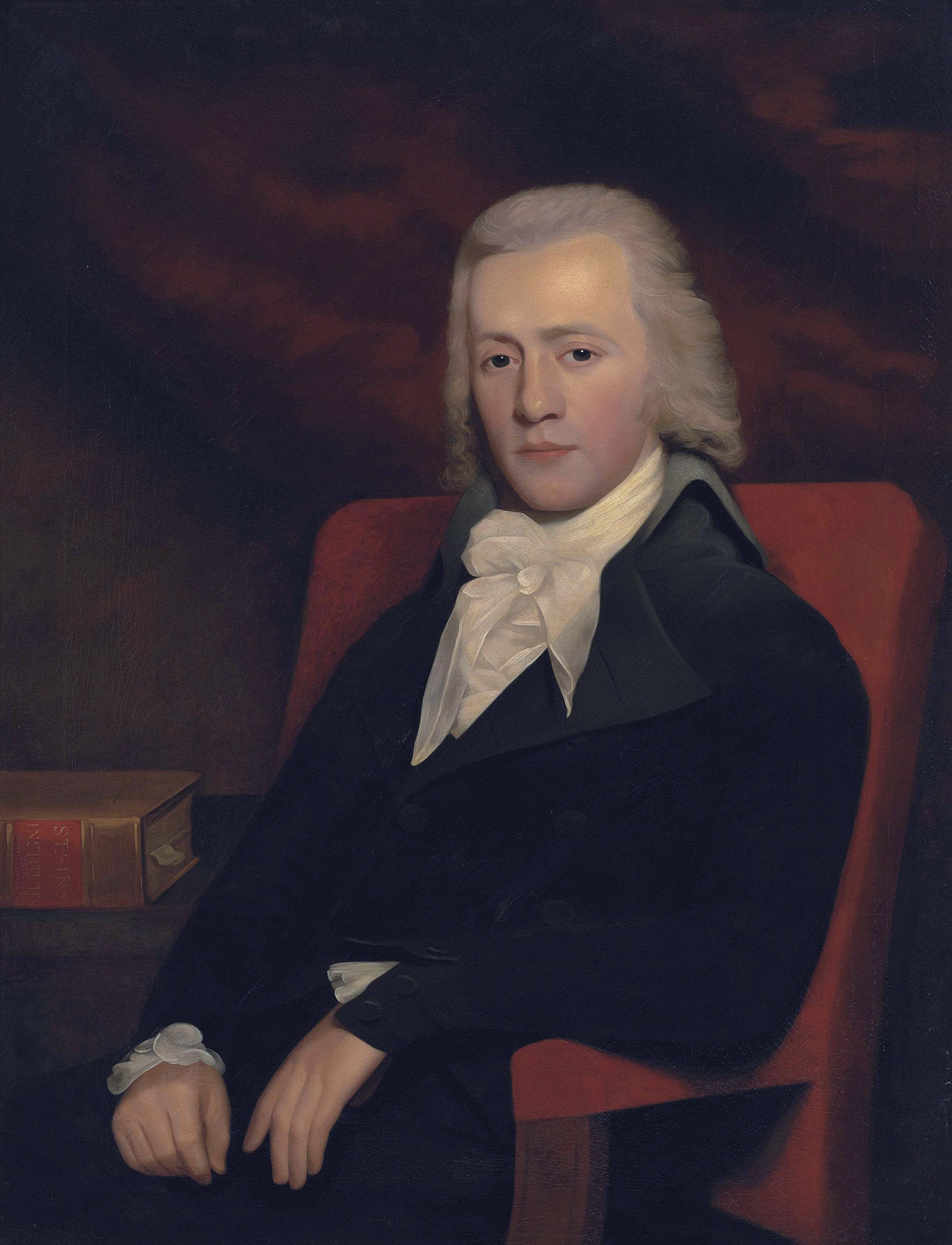
William Erskine, Lord Kinnedder (1768–1822) (circle of Henry Raeburn)

William Erskine, Lord Kinneder (1768–1822), was a friend and confidant of Sir Walter Scott, and a scholar and songwriter.

== Early life and education ==
Erskine was the son of the Rev. William Erskine, episcopalian minister of Muthill, Perthshire. He was baptized at Muthill on 29 August 1768. He was educated at the University of Glasgow; while there he boarded in the house of Andrew Macdonald, episcopalian clergyman and author of Vimonda, from whom, according to Lockhart, he derived a strong passion for old English literature.

== Career ==
He passed advocate at the Scottish bar on 3 July 1790, and became the close friend and literary confidant of Scott. In 1792 Erskine, with Scott and other young advocates, formed a class for the study of German. According to Scott's biographer John Gibson Lockhart, the companionship of Erskine, owing to his special accomplishments as a classical scholar and acquaintance with the "severe models of antiquity", was highly serviceable to Scott as a student of German drama and romance. Lockhart represents him as being mercilessly severe on "the mingled absurdities and vulgarities of German detail". It was Erskine who negotiated for Scott's translation of Lenore in 1796. In 1801, while in London, Erskine happened to show the volume to "Monk" Lewis, who thereupon "anxiously requested that Scott might be enlisted as a contributor to his miscellany entitled Tales of Wonder". Soon after Scott began his great career as an author, he resolved to trust to the detection of minor inaccuracies to two persons only, James Ballantyne and Erskine, the latter being "the referee whenever the poet hesitated about taking the advice of the zealous typographer". The friends joined in keeping up the delusion that Erskine and not Scott was the author of the portions of The Bridal of Triermain, and wrote a preface intended to "throw out the knowing ones".

Scott dedicated to Erskine the third canto of Marmion, which was published in February 1808. Erskine was appointed sheriff depute of Orkney on 6 June 1809, and in 1814 Scott accompanied him and other friends on a voyage to Orkney. Lockhart ascribes to Erskine the critical estimate of the Waverley novels included in Scott's own notice in the Quarterly Review of Old Mortality, in answer to the sectarian attacks of Thomas M'Crie the Elder against his representation of the covenanters. By Scott's unwearied exertions on his behalf Erskine was in January 1822 promoted to the bench as Lord Kinneder. The charge against him of an improper liaison, a sex scandal with Mrs Burt, a well known prostitute from Edinburgh, so seriously affected his health and spirits that, though it was proved to be utterly groundless, he never recovered from the shock caused by the accusation. It "struck", said Scott, "into his heart and soul"; he became nerveless and despondent, was finally attacked by fever and delirium, and died on 14 August 1822. Lockhart states that he never saw Scott "in such a state of dejection" as when he accompanied him in attendance upon Kinneder's funeral. At the time George IV was paying his memorable visit to Edinburgh, and Scott, owing to his grief, plunged into the gaiety of the moment with an aching heart. "If ever a pure spirit quitted this vale of tears", wrote Sir Walter to a friend, "it was William Erskine's. I must turn to, and see what can be done about getting some pension for his daughters." Lockhart thought that Erskine was "the only man in whose society Scott took great pleasure, during the more vigorous part of his life, that had neither constitution nor inclination for any of the rough bodily exercise in which he himself delighted." If, as Erskine supposed, Redmond in Rokeby is meant for a portrait of himself, Lockhart must have exaggerated Erskine's effeminacy. Erskine wrote several Scottish songs.

== Personal life ==
On 13 September 1800 Kinneder married Euphemia Robison (only daughter of Professor John Robison- Physicist), who died in September 1819. She was buried in the churchyard of Saline, Fife, where there is an epitaph on her tombstone written by Scott.

William Erskine's children with Euphemia Robison were:

Euphemia (4 June 1801 Saline, Fife, Scotland – 7 June 1852 Portobello, Midlothian, Scotland) m. George Dawson 22 June 1829 Edinburgh, Scotland, 5 children

Helen Drummond (3 December 1803 Saline, Fife Scotland – 11 August 1829 Ellichpoor, Bombay, India) d.s.p.

William (11 July 1805 Saline, Fife, Scotland – 28 April 1811 Edinburgh, Scotland)

Mary Anne (17 March 1807 Saline, Fife, Scotland – 13 August 1881 Bolarum, India) m. Joseph Baker Puget (1803–1833) 1 July 1831 Ellichpoor, Bombay, India, m. Alexander Adam (1795–1834) 5 June 1834 Bolarum, India, d.s.p.

Jane (2 April 1809 Saline, Fife, Scotland – 26 February 1837 Leamington, Edinburgh, Scotland) d.s.p

John (6 November 1810 Edinburgh, Scotland – 8 July 1846 Saline, Fife, Scotland) m. Isabella Christianne Bunbury (1813–1876) Bengal, India, 2 children

William (31 May 1813 Edinburgh, Scotland – 12 May 1901 Sarnia, Ontario, Canada) m. Mary Wright (1803–1890) 30 April 1835 Monaghan North, Peterborough County, Upper Canada, 3 children

Infant daughter (died 6 March 1817 Edinburgh, Scotland)
