= Elizabeth Younge =

English actress (1740–1797)

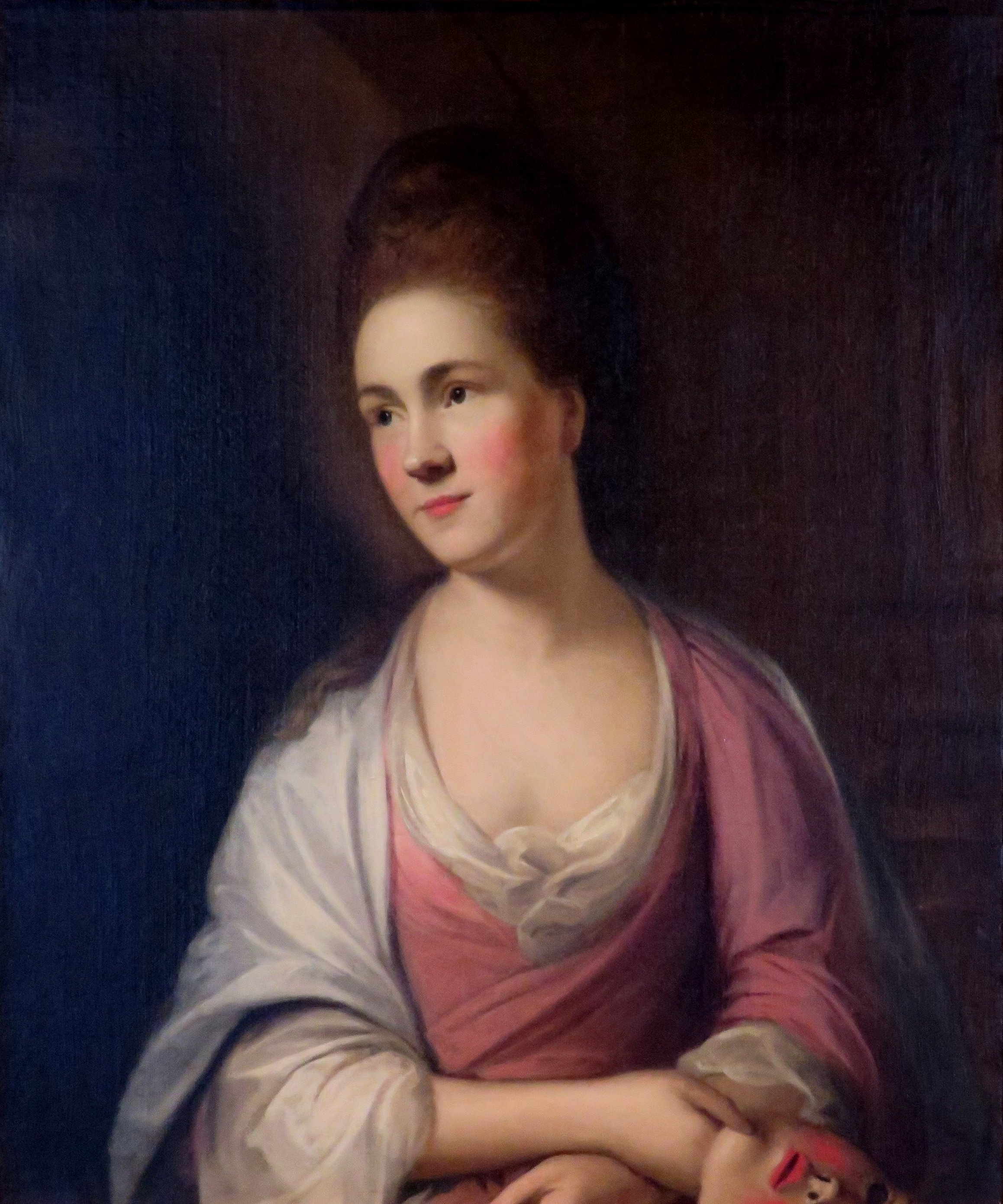
1774 portrait of Younge by Thomas Hickey

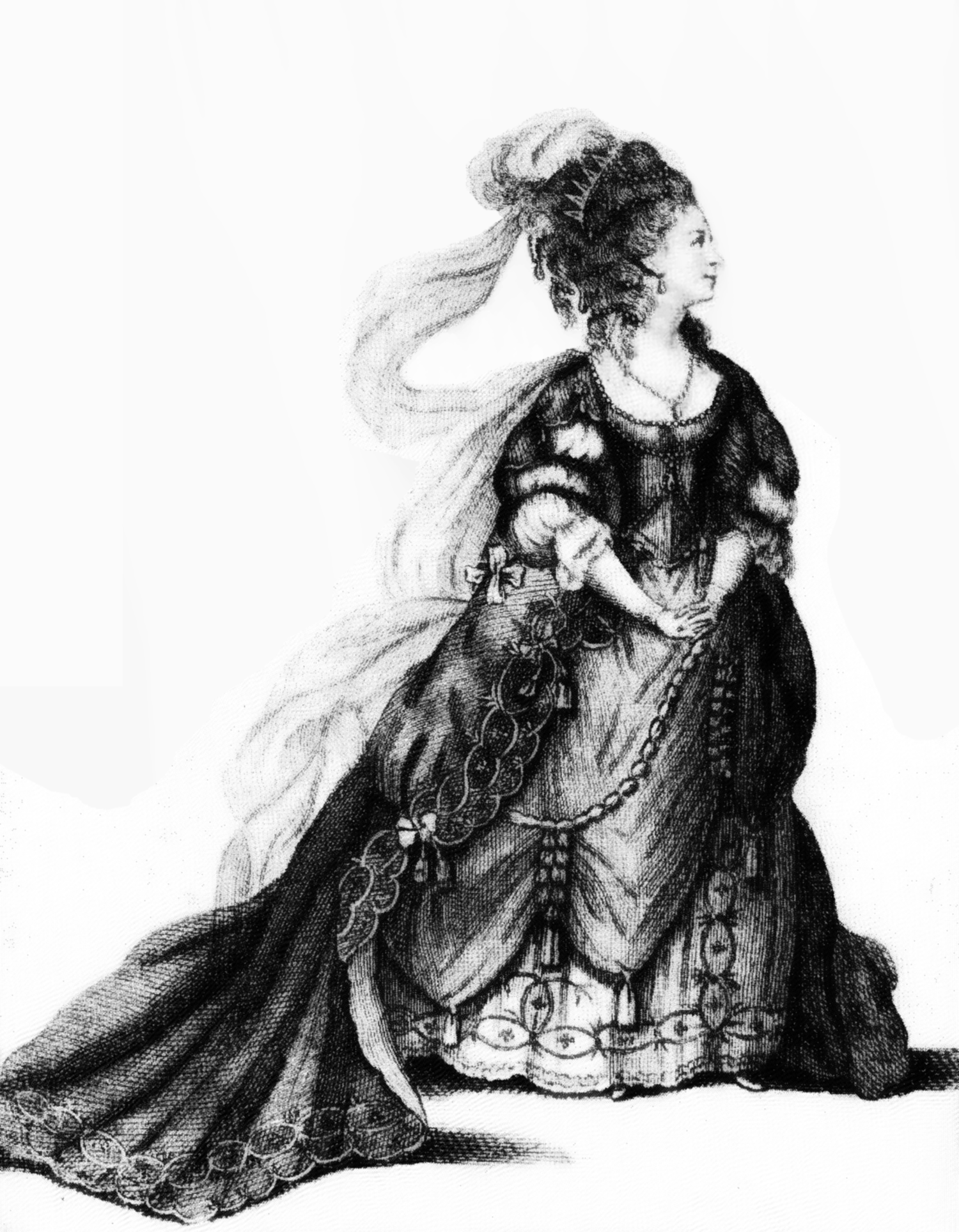
Younge as Cleopatra in 1772

Elizabeth Younge (1740 – 15 March 1797) (Note: Her epitaph in Westminster Abbey states that she died at the age of 52 but The New Monthly Magazine which gave her d.o.b. as 1940 wrote, "How this error in her age arose there is no possibility of ever guessing, as her real age was so well known.") was an English actress who specialized in Shakespearean roles.

== Biography ==
Younge was born near Old Gravel Lane, Southwark. An Elizabeth Young, daughter of Samuel and Mary Young, was baptized at St Olave's, Southwark, on 14 January 1744, but it is not known if this was the same person. She received her early education at a day-school with other working-class children. After she left school, she became apprenticed to a milliner. Her parents died while she was still young and she had to support herself. In her leisure time, she did a great deal of reading and devoted herself to studying the best poets, especially the dramatic ones.

She made friends with a young woman who was the daughter of an actor named Mr. Thompson. Around 1767–8, Younge was introduced by Thompson to George Garrick, younger brother of the theatre manager David Garrick. The younger Garrick was sufficiently impressed by Younge's acting that he took her to his brother. The timing was fortunate for Younge, as it was during that season that the actress Hannah Pritchard retired, and Garrick was having difficulties with Ann Barry. Garrick liked to keep a good actress in reserve, and not only hired Younge for the Drury Lane company, but also gave her personal tuition.

Younge's début at Drury Lane was on 22 October 1768, when she appeared as Imogen in Cymbeline. Garrick was pleased enough to raise her salary from £2 to £3 per week, while William Hopkins, the prompter, wrote of her performance in his diary,

Miss Younge – an elegant Figure in both dresses, has a very good voice, but wants management, — a great deal of acting about her, and would make a great figure, if she had a better face. Upon the whole she played the part amazingly well, and had deserved the applause.

Younge's next parts were Jane Shore in The Tragedy of Jane Shore by Nicholas Rowe and Ovisa in the première of Alexander Dow's Zingis. This play was not well received, and Younge was hissed by the audience. On 7 April 1769, she played Perdita in Florizel and Perdita, Garrick's adaptation of The Winter's Tale. That summer, she worked at Richmond with James Love, but in the autumn she returned to Drury Lane and on 2 October, she played Juliet in Romeo and Juliet.

Remaining at Drury Lane, Younge took the part of Imogen again, in the new season in 1770. This was followed by Alcmena in Amphitryon, Lady Easy in The Careless Husband, and Almera in The Mourning Bride, but after quarrelling with Garrick over her salary, she left Drury Lane for the short-lived Capel Street Theatre in Dublin, where she met with considerable success. She spent the summer of 1771 in Bristol, and, after coming to some agreement with Garrick, returned to Drury Lane to play Imogen once again on 26 September. Her performance, according to Hopkins, was "receiv'd with Great Applause".

Younge remained at Drury Lane until 1778, though in the summer months she also performed in other cities. Her relationship with Garrick seems to have been an uneven one: he greatly respected her talent, but was irritated by her temperament, and at one stage gave a leading role to a lesser actress to belittle her. She played the role of Viola in front of King George III, though Garrick was forced to send her a threatening letter after she attempted to withdraw from the play on the grounds of having a cough.

Younge was the fifth highest paid actress at Drury Lane theatre at the time of Garrick's retirement, earning £12 per week. Following a dispute with his successor, Thomas Sheridan, over money, she moved to Covent Garden after the 1778–9 season, and remained there until her death.

Younge married Alexander Pope, a young Irish artist and actor, on 9 August 1785. They had one son. Younge was forced to give up her career on 26 January 1797, because of a serious illness. She died on Wednesday 15 March 1797, at her home, 5 Half Moon Street. Some sources give her age at death as fifty-two; others report it as fifty-seven. She was buried at Westminster Abbey on 22 March.

== Selected roles ==
- Ovisa in Zingis by Alexander Dow (1768)
- Emily in The Maid of Kent by Francis Godolphin Waldron (1773)
- Bella in The Runaway by Hannah Cowley (1776)
- Matilda in The Battle of Hastings by Richard Cumberland (1778)
- Emmelina in The Fatal Falsehood by Hannah More (1779)
- Princess in The Law of Lombardy by Robert Jephson (1779)
- Letitia Hardy in The Belle's Stratagem by Hannah Cowley (1780)
- Lady Danvers in The World as it Goes by Hannah Cowley (1781)
- Clara in Duplicity by Thomas Holcroft (1781)
- Hortensia in The Count of Narbonne by Robert Jephson (1781)
- Bloomer in Which is the Man? by Hannah Cowley (1782)
- Miss Archer in More Ways Than One by Hannah Cowley (1783)
- Charlotte in He Would Be a Soldier by Frederick Pilon (1786)
- Ethelberta in The Siege of Berwick by Edward Jerningham (1793)
- Martilda in The Siege of Meaux by Henry James Pye (1794)
- Adela in The Days of Yore by Richard Cumberland (1796)
