= The Bridal of Triermain =

Poem by Walter Scott

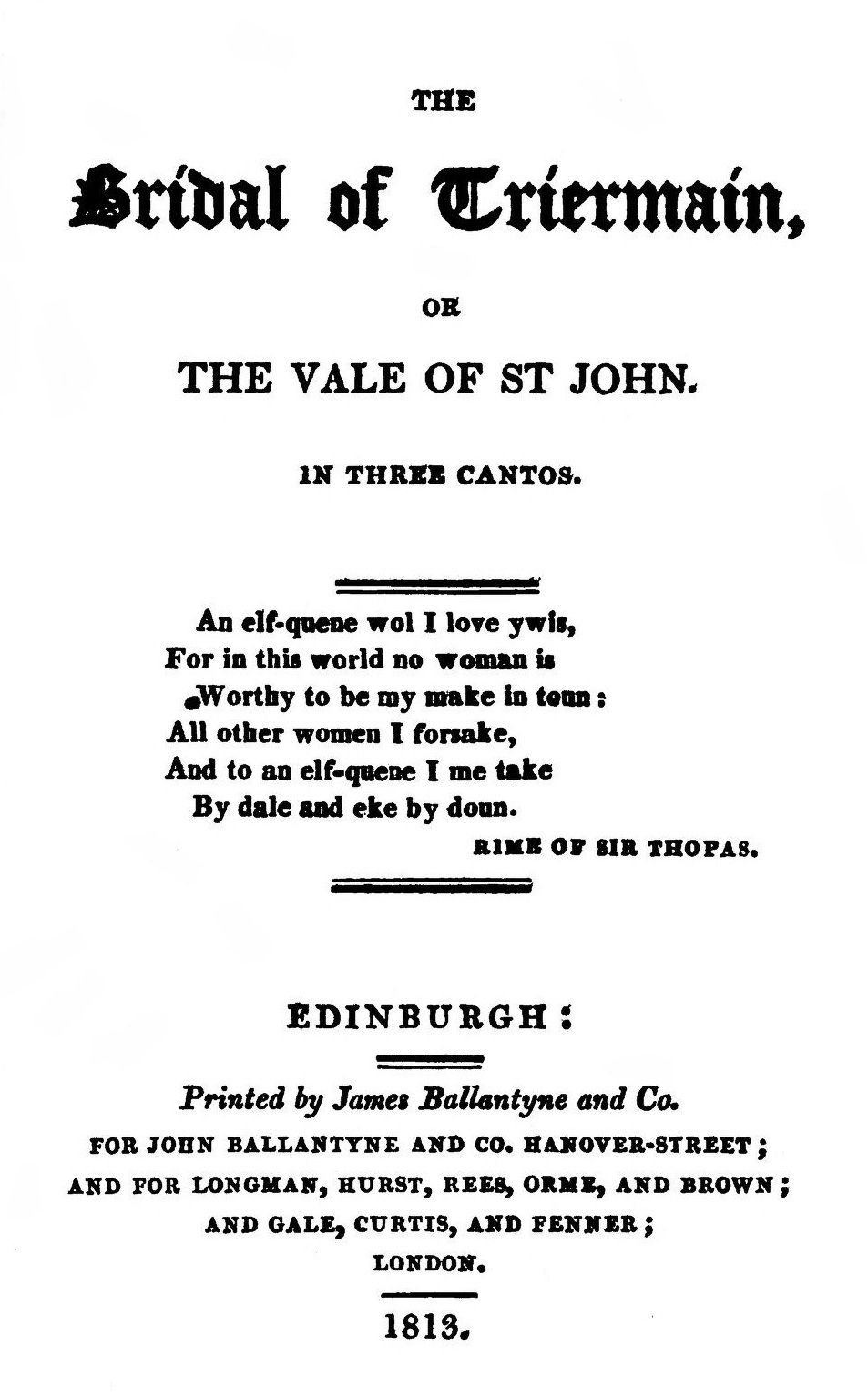
First edition title page

The Bridal of Triermain is a narrative poem in three cantos by Walter Scott, published anonymously in 1813. It is written in a flexible metre of four and three stress lines. Set in Cumberland, it recounts the exploits of a knight as he seeks to rescue a beautiful maiden, Gyneth, the illegitimate daughter of King Arthur, doomed by Merlin 500 years previously to an enchanted sleep inside a magic castle.

== Background ==
In 1809 Scott included in an article 'The Inferno of Altisidora' for The Edinburgh Annual Review three short imitations, of Crabbe, Moore, and himself. The last of these was entitled 'The Vision of Triermain' and consisted of an early version of the first eight stanzas of what was to become The Bridal of Triermain. While he was composing Rokeby in the autumn of 1812 Scott took some time to extend the fragment to three cantos, planning to publish it anonymously to test the critics, especially Francis Jeffrey, though in the event Jeffrey did not review it. As part of the deception Scott took up an offer by William Erskine to be involved in writing the preface. The first two cantos were almost complete by 10 September. On 1 November Scott was hoping that Rokeby would appear in time for Christmas and The Bridal as soon as possible thereafter, but the former did not appear until January 1813 and The Bridal had to wait till March.

== Editions ==
The Bridal of Triermain, or The Vale of St John was published anonymously on 9 March 1813 in Edinburgh by John Ballantyne and Co., and in London by Longman, Hurst, Rees, Orme, and Brown, and Gale, Curtis, and Fenner. The price was 7s 6d (37.5p). A further three editions followed in the same year, though the last of them was dated 1814.

A critical edition is due to appear in Volume 5 of The Edinburgh Edition of Walter Scott's Poetry published by Edinburgh University Press.

== Canto summary ==
Introduction: Courting his social superior Lucy in a sylvan retreat Arthur sings the lay that follows.

Canto 1: Believing he has seen a fair maiden, though she has not been visible to his entourage, Sir Roland de Vaux of Triermain sends his page to consult the sage Lyulph. Lyulph says the maiden was born 501 years ago, but that she may be won by a knight prepared to venture to the valley of Saint John. He tells the following story. Riding from his court at Carlisle in search of adventure, King Arthur discovers a castle where he is welcomed by a bevy of ladies and their queen Guendolen.

Canto 2: (Lyulph's tale continues) King Arthur passes three months with Guendolen before returning to his duties at Carlisle in spite of her attempt to detain him with a potion. Fifteen years later, Gyneth, the daughter of King Arthur and Guendolen, arrives at Carlisle to claim her father's protection. The knights do battle for her hand, but when the strife develops out of control Gyneth refuses to stop it by dropping her warder: to punish her Merlin appears and decrees that she must sleep in the valley of Saint of John until a knight is able to find and wake her. (As the canto ends Arthur suspends his lay and engages in a satirical characterisation of the upper-class fops that are about to invade the woodland sanctuary as noon approaches.)

Introduction to Canto 3: Arthur is moved to resume his lay which Lucy (now his wife) has on two former occasions twice requested in vain.

Canto 3: After a long vigil in the valley of Saint John, Sir Roland de Vaux is rewarded by achieving entry to the castle. He survives a series of perils and temptations before releasing Gyneth.

Conclusion: Arthur tells Lucy that no knight since De Vaux has ever seen the castle.

== Reception ==
The reviewers of The Bridal were generally approving, with six of the articles favourable and only one hostile: The Port Folio (Philadelphia) took the work to be an inferior imitation of Scott. Only one of the reviewers knew that Scott was the author: Drakard's Paper had heard of the authorship of the fragment published in the Edinburgh Annual Register. There was general appreciation of the poem's tenderness, elegance, delicacy, and clarity, if it lacked something of the spirit of Scott's acknowledged poems. The third canto tended to be found predictable and monotonous.

== See also ==
- Sleeping Beauty
