= Mary Morton (actress) =

British stage actress

Mary Morton (c. 1756–1800) was a British stage actress. She was particularly associated with the Theatre Royal, Covent Garden in London and was a member of the company for 11 years from 1773 until 1784. She played secondary roles in comedies and ballad operas alongside occasional leads in farces and melodramas. Born Mary Dayes she acted under her married name throughout her career. She was buried at St Mary's Church in Ealing.

== Selected roles ==
- Lady Jane in Know Your Own Mind by Arthur Murphy (1777)
- Jacqueline in The Count of Narbonne by Robert Jephson (1781)
- Miss Ogle in The Belle's Stratagem by Hannah Cowley (1780)
- Clarinda in Which is the Man? by Hannah Cowley (1782)
- Miss Angle in Appearance Is Against Them by Elizabeth Inchbald (1785)

== Bibliography ==
- Highfill, Philip H, Burnim, Kalman A. & Langhans, Edward A. A Biographical Dictionary of Actors, Actresses, Musicians, Dancers, Managers & Other Stage Personnel in London, 1660-1800, Volume 10. SIU Press, 1973.
- Straub, Kristina, G. Anderson, Misty and O'Quinn, Daniel . The Routledge Anthology of Restoration and Eighteenth-Century Drama. Taylor & Francis, 2017.
- Van Lennep, W. The London Stage, 1660–1800: Volume One, 1660–1700. Southern Illinois University Press, 1960.
