= Matthew Bramble =

Matthew Bramble may refer to:

- Matthew Bramble (character), a fictional character in the novel The Expedition of Humphry Clinker, by Tobias Smollett, 1771
- Matthew Bramble, the pen name of Andrew Macdonald (poet) (1757–1790), Scottish poet, playwright and clergyman
