= The Mysterious Husband =

Play by Richard Cumberland

- Original language: English
- Written by: Richard Cumberland
- Genre: Drama

Premiere
- Date: 28 January 1783
- Place: Covent Garden Theatre, London

The Mysterious Husband is a play by the British writer Richard Cumberland. It is a Domestic drama with a tragic ending, first performed in 1783. Along with several other Cumberland plays it was influenced by the 1768 gothic play The Mysterious Mother by Horace Walpole.

The original Covent Garden cast included John Henderson as Lord Davenant (a part written for him), William Thomas Lewis as Charles Davenant, Richard Wroughton as Captain Dorner, Richard Yates as Sir Edmund Travers, Elizabeth Satchell as Marianne and Elizabeth Younge as Lady Davenant.

== Bibliography ==
- Frank, Frederick S (ed.). The Castle of Otranto and The Mysterious Mother. Broadview Press, 2003.
- Hogan, C.B (ed.) The London Stage, 1660-1800: Volume V. Southern Illinois University Press, 1968.
- Nicoll, Allardyce. A History of English Drama 1660-1900. Volume III: Late Eighteenth Century Drama. Cambridge University Press, 1952.
