= Astley Bransby =

English stage actor

Astley Bransby (died 1789) was an English stage actor and theatre manager who was a long-standing member of the company of the Theatre Royal, Drury Lane under David Garrick. His first known performance was Captain Plume in George Farquhar's The Recruiting Officer in 1744 at the Haymarket where he was part of a group of young actors being trained by Charles Macklin. The following year he made his first appearance at Drury Lane and remained there for three decades, with the expection of a four-year spell at the Theatre Royal, Covent Garden from 1749 to 1753. He played a vast number of supporting roles in the repertory as well as occasionally originating new roles. He retired from thestage in 1777 from ill health. He was a co-manager of Richmond Theatre.

== Selected roles ==
- Captain Plume in The Recruiting Officer by George Farquhar (1744)
- Octar in The Orphan of China by Arthur Murphy (1759)
- Dumnorix in The Siege of Aquileia by John Home (1760)
- Blandford in All in the Wrong by Arthur Murphy (1761)
- Bridgemore in The Fashionable Lover by Richard Cumberland (1772)
- Russet in The Jealous Wife by George Colman the Elder (1777)

== Bibliography ==
- Greene, John C. Theatre in Dublin, 1745–1820: A Calendar of Performances. Lehigh University Press, 2011.
- Highfill, Philip H, Burnim, Kalman A. & Langhans, Edward A. A Biographical Dictionary of Actors, Actresses, Musicians, Dancers, Managers and Other Stage Personnel in London, 1660-1800, Volumes 1-2. SIU Press, 1973.
- Pedicord Harry William & Bergmann, Fredrick Louis (ed.) The Plays of David Garrick: Volume II. SIU Press, 1980.
