= First Love (play) =

1795 play by Richard Cumberland

- Written by: Richard Cumberland
- Original language: English
- Genre: Comedy

Premiere
- Date premiered: 12 May 1795
- Place premiered: Theatre Royal, Drury Lane, London

First Love is a 1795 sentimental comedy play by the British playwright Richard Cumberland. It was first performed at the Drury Lane Theatre in May 1795. Frederick Mowbray becomes the protector of Sabrina Rosny after her abandonment by Lord Sensitive.

The original Drury Lane cast included Richard Wroughton as Lord Sensitive, Thomas King as Sir Miles Mowbray, John Palmer as Frederick Mowbray, John Bannister as David, Robert Palmer as Mr Wrangle, Richard Suett as Billy Bustler, Elizabeth Farren as Lady Ruby, Jane Pope as Mrs Wrangle, Charlotte Tidswell as Mrs Kate, Dorothea Jordan as Sabrina Rosny and Ann Heard as Lady Ruby's Servant.

== Bibliography ==
- Hogan, C.B (ed.) The London Stage, 1660–1800: Volume V. Southern Illinois University Press, 1968.
- Mudford, William. The Life of Richard Cumberland. Sherwood, Neely & Jones, 1812.
- Nicoll, Allardyce. A History of English Drama 1660-1900. Volume III: Late Eighteenth Century Drama. Cambridge University Press, 1952.
