= Vimonda =

1787 play

- Original language: English
- Written by: Andrew Macdonald
- Genre: Tragedy
- Setting: Scottish Borders

Premiere
- Date: 5 September 1787
- Place: Theatre Royal, Haymarket, London

Vimonda is a 1787 tragedy by the Scottish writer Andrew Macdonald. After first appearing at the Theatre Royal, Edinburgh in was then staged at London's Theatre Royal, Haymarket on 5 September 1787. The original Haymarket cast included Elizabeth Kemble as Vimonda, Stephen Kemble as Rothsay, John Bannister as Melville, Robert Bensley as Dundore, James Aickin as Barnard and Frances Barnet Woollery as Alfreda.

== Bibliography ==
- Greene, John C. Theatre in Dublin, 1745-1820: A Calendar of Performances, Volume 6. Lexington Books, 2011.
- Nicoll, Allardyce. A History of English Drama 1660–1900: Volume III. Cambridge University Press, 2009.
- Hogan, C.B (ed.) The London Stage, 1660–1800: Volume V. Southern Illinois University Press, 1968.
