= Antonio (play) =

1800 play

- Original language: English
- Written by: William Godwin
- Genre: Tragedy
- Setting: Zaragoza, 15th century

Premiere
- Date: 13 December 1800
- Place: Theatre Royal, Drury Lane, London

Antonio, or the Soldier's Return is an 1800 historical tragedy by the British writer William Godwin. It premiered at the Theatre Royal, Drury Lane on 13 December 1800. The cast included John Philip Kemble as Antonio, Sarah Siddons as Helena, William Barrymore as Don Gusman, Richard Wroughton as Don Pedro, Charles Kemble as Don Henry, William Powell as Don Diego. Both the audience and critical reaction were negative. Seven years later another of Godwin's plays Faulkener was staged at the same theatre.

== Bibliography ==
- Greene, John C. Theatre in Dublin, 1745-1820: A Calendar of Performances, Volume 6. Lexington Books, 2011. ISBN 978-1-61146-118-3.
- O'Shaughnessy, David. The Plays of William Godwin. Routledge, 2016.
- Nicoll, Allardyce. A History of Early Nineteenth Century Drama 1800-1850. Cambridge University Press, 1930.
