= The Prisoner at Large =

1788 play

- Original language: English
- Written by: John O'Keeffe
- Genre: Comedy
- Setting: Western Ireland, present day

Premiere
- Date: 2 July 1788
- Place: Theatre Royal, Haymarket, London

The Prisoner at Large is a 1788 comedy play by the Irish John O'Keeffe. A farce, it premiered as an afterpiece at the Theatre Royal, Haymarket in London on 2 July 1788. The original cast included James Brown Williamson as Lord Esmond, William Henry Moss as Old Dowdle, Ralph Wewitzer as Count Fripon, Robert Palmer as Jack Connor, John Phillimore as Frill, John Edwin as Muns and Elizabeth Kemble as Adelaide. The Irish premiere took place at the Crow Street Theatre in Dublin on 7 August 1789.

== Bibliography ==
- Greene, John C. Theatre in Dublin, 1745-1820: A Calendar of Performances, Volume 6. Lexington Books, 2011.
- Nicoll, Allardyce. A History of English Drama 1660–1900: Volume III. Cambridge University Press, 2009.
- Hogan, C.B (ed.) The London Stage, 1660–1800: Volume V. Southern Illinois University Press, 1968.
