= The Law of Lombardy =

1779 tragedy written by Robert Jephson

- Original language: English
- Written by: Robert Jephson
- Genre: Tragedy

Premiere
- Date: 8 February 1779
- Place: Theatre Royal, Drury Lane, London

The Law of Lombardy is a 1779 tragedy by the Irish writer Robert Jephson. The original Drury Lane cast included William Smith as Paladore, Robert Bensley as King, John Hayman Packer as Rinaldo, Richard Hurst as Asciano, James Wrighten as Forester, John Henderson as Bireno, Mary Robinson as Alinda and Elizabeth Younge as Princess. It was dedicated by Jephson to George III.

== Bibliography ==
- Nicoll, Allardyce. A History of English Drama 1660–1900: Volume III. Cambridge University Press, 2009.
- Hogan, C.B (ed.) The London Stage, 1660–1800: Volume V. Southern Illinois University Press, 1968.
