= The Count of Narbonne =

1781 tragedy by Robert Jephson

- Original language: English
- Written by: Robert Jephson
- Genre: Tragedy

Premiere
- Date: 17 November 1781
- Place: Covent Garden Theatre, London

The Count of Narbonne is a 1781 tragedy by the Irish writer Robert Jephson. It was inspired by Horace Walpole's novel The Castle of Otranto.

It premiered at the Covent Garden Theatre. The original cast featured John Henderson as Austin, Richard Wroughton as Raymond, William Thomas Lewis as Theodore, James Thompson as Fabian, James Fearon as Officer, Mary Morton as Jacqueline, Elizabeth Satchell as Adelaide and Elizabeth Younge as Hortensia.

== Bibliography ==
- Nicoll, Allardyce. A History of English Drama 1660–1900: Volume III. Cambridge University Press, 2009.
- Hogan, C.B (ed.) The London Stage, 1660–1800: Volume V. Southern Illinois University Press, 1968.
