= The Married Man =

1789 play

- Original language: English
- Written by: Elizabeth Inchbald
- Genre: Comedy
- Setting: London, present day

Premiere
- Date: 15 July 1789
- Place: Theatre Royal, Haymarket, London

The Married Man is a 1789 comedy play by the English writer Elizabeth Inchbald, inspired by the 1727 French play Le Philosophe Marié by Philippe Néricault Destouches. It premiered at the Theatre Royal, Haymarket in London on 15 July 1789. The original cast included John Palmer as Lord Lovemore, John Bannister as Sir John Classick, James Aickin as Mr Classick, Stephen Kemble as Tradwell Classick, James Brown Williamson as Dorimant, Elizabeth Kemble as Lady Classick and Mary Whitfield as Lucy.

== Bibliography ==
- Greene, John C. Theatre in Dublin, 1745-1820: A Calendar of Performances, Volume 6. Lexington Books, 2011.
- Nicoll, Allardyce. A History of English Drama 1660–1900: Volume III. Cambridge University Press, 2009.
- Hogan, C.B (ed.) The London Stage, 1660–1800: Volume V. Southern Illinois University Press, 1968.
- Robertson, Ben P. Elizabeth Inchbald's Reputation: A Publishing and Reception History. Routledge, 2015.
