= Francis Aickin =

Irish actor

Francis Aickin (died 1805), (Note: Also spelt Francis Aikin) was an Irish actor, who worked at the Edinburgh Theatre in Scotland, and between 1765 and 1792 in theatres in the West End of London.

Francis Aickin first appeared in London in 1765 as Dick Amlet in John Vanbrugh's The Confederacy at Drury Lane. He acted there, and at Covent Garden, until 1792. His repertory consisted of over eighty characters, and among his best parts were the Ghost in Hamlet and Jaques in As You Like It. His success in impassioned declamatory roles obtained for him the nickname of "Tyrant".

== Biography ==
Francis Aickin was born in Dublin and brought up to the trade of his father, a weaver in that city; but, following the example of his younger brother, James Aickin, he became a strolling player. Having appeared as George Barnwell and sustained other characters in various country towns, he joined the manager of the Smock Alley Theatre, Dublin.

Aickin the shared the management of the Edinburgh Theatre in Scotland's capital with Mr. John Jackson, before moving to London.

He made his first appearance at Drury Lane as Dick in The Confederacy on 17 May 1765. He continued a member of the Drury Lane Company until the close of the season of 1773–1774. In the following year he carried his services to Covent Garden, and appeared there every year until the close of the season of 1791–1792.

Aickin had commenced business as a hosier in York Street, Covent Garden, and obtained the patronage of certain members of the Royal family. He closed his shop in 1787 on the death of his first wife, an Irish lady of family and some fortune, and entered upon the management of the Liverpool Theatre. His success was not great, but he prospered by a second marriage with a widow dowered with £800 a year.

Genest gives a list of upwards of eighty characters which Francis Aickin was accustomed to assume. Both Atckins and his brother James were members of the School of Garrick, a club composed of actors who were contemporaries of David Garrick. (Note: Not to be confused with the later Garrick Club (founded 1831).)

== Assessment ==
He was of pleasing person, good judgement, his voice was sonorous and distinct, and from his success in the impassioned declamatory parts of tragedy he obtained the nickname of "Tyrant Aickin"—"a character in private life no man was more the reverse of, either in temper or the duties of friendship".

Nor did all his merit lie in tragedy; in the serious parts of comedy, such as Sir John Flowerdale in the School for Fathers, the pleasing harmony of his tones, and his precision of expression were of great service to the performance.

== Selected roles ==
- Colonel Camply in The Widowed Wife by William Kenrick (1767)
- Zingis in Zingis by Alexander Dow (1768)
- Pharasmanes in Zenobia by Arthur Murphy (1768)
- Connan in The Fatal Discovery by John Home (1769)
- Stockwell in The West Indian by Richard Cumberland (1771)
- Melathon in The Grecian Daughter by Arthur Murphy (1772)
- King of Austuria in Alonzo by John Home (1773)
- Amasis in Sethona by Alexander Dow (1774)
- Bygrove in Know Your Own Mind by Arthur Murphy (1777)
- Earl Raby in Percy by Hannah More (1777)
- Bertrand in The Fatal Falsehood by Hannah More (1779)
- Grey The Chapter of Accidents by Sophia Lee (1780)
- Daggerly in The Walloons by Richard Cumberland (1782)
- Colonel Talbot in He Would Be a Soldier by Frederick Pilon (1786)
- Governor Mortonin All on a Summer's Day by Elizabeth Inchbald (1787)
- Villiers in The Ton by Eglantine Wallace (1788)
- Peasant in The Child of Nature by Elizabeth Inchbald (1788)
- Sir Carrol O'Donovan in The Toy by John O'Keeffe (1789)
- Count Kolberg in The German Hotel by Thomas Holcroft (1790)
- Mr Dorimont as The School for Arrogance by Thomas Holcroft (1791)
