= Which is the Man? =

British comedy play (1782)

- Original language: English
- Written by: Hannah Cowley
- Genre: Comedy

Premiere
- Date: 9 February 1782
- Place: Theatre Royal, Covent Garden, London

Which is the Man? is a 1782 comedy play by the British writer Hannah Cowley. The original Covent Garden cast included John Henderson as Fitzherbert, William Thomas Lewis as Beauchamp, Richard Wroughton as Belville, John Quick as Pendragon, Charles Lee Lewes as Lord Sparkle, Isabella Mattocks as Sophy Pendragon, Sarah Maria Wilson as Kitty, Mary Morton as Clarinda, Harriet Pitt as Tiffany, Elizabeth Satchell as Julia and Elizabeth Younge as Bloomer.

== Bibliography ==
- Nicoll, Allardyce. A History of English Drama 1660–1900: Volume III. Cambridge University Press, 2009.
- Hogan, C.B (ed.) The London Stage, 1660–1800: Volume V. Southern Illinois University Press, 1968.
