= The Metamorphosis (play) =

- Original language: English
- Written by: William Jackson
- Genre: Comedy

Premiere
- Date: 5 December 1783
- Place: Theatre Royal, Drury Lane, London

The Metamorphosis is a 1783 comedy play by the Irish writer William Jackson.

The original Drury Lane cast included James William Dodd as Toupee, Richard Suett as Sir Charles Freeman, John Hayman Packer as Mr Marlow, William Barrymore as Freeman and Mary Ann Wrighten as Mary.

== Bibliography ==
- Nicoll, Allardyce. A History of English Drama 1660–1900: Volume III. Cambridge University Press, 2009.
- Hogan, C.B (ed.) The London Stage, 1660–1800: Volume V. Southern Illinois University Press, 1968.
