= Julia (play) =

1787 tragedy by Robert Jephson

- Written by: Robert Jephson
- Original language: English
- Genre: Tragedy

Premiere
- Date premiered: 14 April 1787
- Place premiered: Theatre Royal, Drury Lane, London

Julia: or, The Italian Lover is a 1787 tragedy by the Irish writer Robert Jephson.

It premiered at Drury Lane with a cast featuring John Philip Kemble as Mentevole, John Palmer as Marcellus, Robert Bensley as Durazzo, James Aickin as Manoa, John Whitfield as Camillo, John Hayman Packer as Duke of Genoa, Priscilla Kemble as Olympia, Charlotte Tidswell as Nerina and Sarah Siddons as Julia.

== Bibliography ==
- Nicoll, Allardyce. A History of English Drama 1660–1900: Volume III. Cambridge University Press, 2009.
- Hogan, C.B (ed.) The London Stage, 1660–1800: Volume V. Southern Illinois University Press, 1968.
