= Ways and Means (Colman play) =

1788 play

- 1811 playbill
- Original language: English
- Written by: George Colman the Younger
- Genre: Comedy

Premiere
- Date: 10 July 1788
- Place: Theatre Royal, Haymarket, London

Ways and Means; Or, a Trip to Dover is a 1788 comedy play by the British writer and theatre manager George Colman the Younger. It premiered at the Theatre Royal, Haymarket in London with a cast that included John Bannister as Sir David Dunder, John Palmer as Random, James Brown Williamson as Scruple, James Aickin as Old Random, Howard Usher as Paul Peery, Lydia Webb as Lady Dunder and Elizabeth Kemble as Harriet. Its Irish premiere was at the Crow Street Theatre in Dublin on 24 April 1793.

== Bibliography ==
- Greene, John C. Theatre in Dublin, 1745-1820: A Calendar of Performances, Volume 6. Lexington Books, 2011.
- Kozar, Richard & Burling, William J. Summer Theatre in London, 1661-1820, and the Rise of the Haymarket Theatre. Fairleigh Dickinson Univ Press, 2000.
- Nicoll, Allardyce. A History of English Drama 1660–1900: Volume III. Cambridge University Press, 2009.
- Hogan, C.B (ed.) The London Stage, 1660–1800: Volume V. Southern Illinois University Press, 1968.
