= Sethona =

1774 play

- Written by: Alexander Dow
- Original language: English
- Genre: Tragedy
- Setting: Ancient Egypt

Premiere
- Date premiered: 19 February 1774
- Place premiered: Theatre Royal, Drury Lane, London

Sethona is a 1774 tragedy by the British writer Alexander Dow. It is set in Ancient Egypt at a time when Menes is heir to the crown. The original Drury Lane cast included Spranger Barry as Serapis, Samuel Reddish as Menes, Francis Aickin as Amasis, James Aickin as Orus, John Hayman Packer as Otanes and Ann Street Barry as Sethona. The prologue was written by Richard Cumberland.

== Plot ==
=== Act 1 ===
In the temple of Osiris, Sethona, former fiancée of Menes, is distraught by Amasis usurping the Egyptian throne and potentially having killed Menes and Seraphis and trying to forcefully marry her. Orus, high priest of Osiris comforts her by telling her that a vision tells him that Egypt would be rightfully restored by Menes and his followers. Myrtaeus tries to comfort Sethona, but she persists. Orus warns Amasis for trying to make the nuptial happen when invasion from Ethiopia might be near, yet Amasis dismisses his supposed divine oracles. Amasis tries to woo Sethona, making many promises, but Sethona rejects his advances. Meanwhile, Menes is revealed to be alive and well in the temple, and he plans a scheme to take back Egypt from Amasis.

=== Act 2 ===
At Sethona's apartment, Sethona meets Menes. Menes tells Sethona what happened, that when he was arrested during their wedding ceremony, he was against his will locked in a cell, but was rescued by Orus. Knowing it was an escape unknown to Amasis, Sethona tries to hide Menes, but he is almost caught by an officer. Otanes, having seen this, suggests to Menes to abandon Sethona to the king for a greater cause, the abolition of tyranny of Amasis and restoring Seraphis to the throne. Otanes also reveals that Seraphis, contrary to the rumours, is alive and well in Ethiopia. But Menes vehemently refuses the offer, and he is at risk of being executed. Otanes also suggests that Sethona marry Amasis, but she again refuses. She pledges to get Amasis to retract his execution order, but Amasis refuses. Soon, Amasis chooses to instead banish Menes from the palace.

=== Act 3 ===
Back in Sethona's apartment, Menes is joined by Orus, who tries to proceed on his plan against Amasis during Amasis's nuptial ceremony. He is then joined by Seraphis. Seraphis soon meets Sethona and the two comforts each other and Seraphis tries to reveal his secrets to her. However, a sudden interruption by Amasis and Otanes breaks off the conversation. Amasis is soon informed by Myrtaeus of a revolt against him led by Menes and Amasis suspects the father of sethona was actually seraphis and is actually alive. Meanwhile, Sethona hears that Seraphis is slain during the conflict, which makes her worry that Menes is also slain, leading to her distress. Menes is rejoined with Sethona.

=== Act 4 ===
In the catacombs, Seraphis is again revealed to be alive; however, mortally wounded. He is joined by Otanes, while Seraphis delivers his dying message. Seraphis is antagonized by Myrtaeus but he soon joins Seraphis's side. Seraphis is found by Sethona in a tomb and Seraphis reveals that when the rebellion succeeds he wish to make Menes the king of Egypt. While Sethona confesses her love of Menes, it is revealed by her father Seraphis that Menes is his son, which means he is her brother. Sethona faints from the shock that her love was incestuous this whole time. Sethona's heart grows cold after knowing the truth. However, she refuses to part ways with her father.

=== Act 5 ===
Sethona, even after knowing the truth, lives happily ever after now that Amasis has been put away and Egypt being restored.

== Review ==
Tobias Smollett, spoke negatively of the production saying while it was lavish enough, it was not enough to hide the defects in the plot.

== Bibliography ==
- Nicoll, Allardyce. A History of English Drama 1660–1900: Volume III. Cambridge University Press, 2009.
- Hogan, C.B (ed.) The London Stage, 1660–1800: Volume V. Southern Illinois University Press, 1968.
