= The Fashionable Lover =

Play written by Richard Cumberland

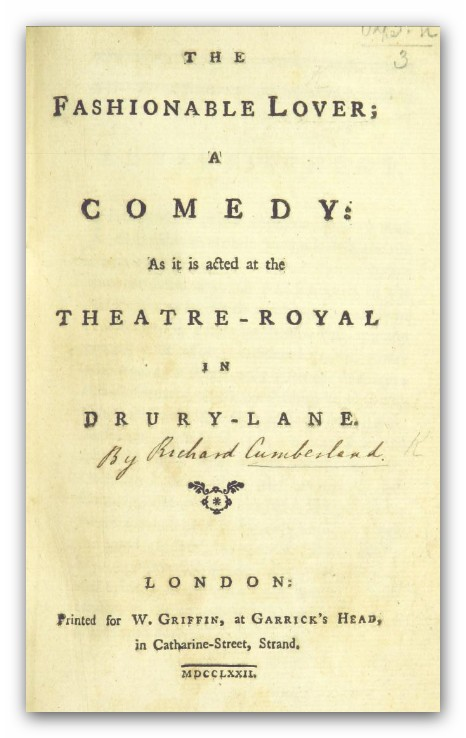
- Original language: English
- Written by: Richard Cumberland
- Genre: Comedy

Premiere
- Date: 20 January 1772
- Place: Theatre Royal, Drury Lane, London

The Fashionable Lover is a comedy play by the British writer Richard Cumberland. It was first staged at the Drury Lane Theatre in London in January 1772. The original Drury Lane cast included James William Dodd as Lord Aberville, Thomas King as Mortimer, Spranger Barry as Aubrey, Samuel Reddish as Tyrrel, Astley Bransby as Bridgemore, Robert Baddeley as Doctor Druid, Francis Godolphin Waldron as Napthali, John Burton as La Jeunesse, John Moody as Colin Macleod, Ann Street Barry as Augusta Aubrey and Elizabeth Hopkins as Mrs. Bridgemore.

== Synopsis ==
A sentimental comedy, it follows the adventures of Augusta Aubrey after she leaves her ward's house and is nearly seduced by the villainous Lord Abberville.

== Bibliography ==
- Nicoll, Allardyce. A History of English Drama 1660-1900. Volume III: Late Eighteenth Century Drama. Cambridge University Press, 1952.
