= The Siege of Aquileia =

1760 tragedy by Scottish writer John Home

- Original language: English
- Written by: John Home
- Genre: Tragedy

Premiere
- Date: 21 February 1760
- Place: Theatre Royal, Drury Lane

The Siege of Aquileia is a five-act verse tragedy by the Scottish writer John Home. Set during the Year of the Six Emperors (238), it dramatises the difficult choice between domestic loyalties and honourable conduct in the public sphere.

Home had become well-known for his 1756 play Douglas and as a consequence moved to London to pursue a dramatic career. The Siege of Aquileia was his third play and was produced at the Theatre Royal, Drury Lane between 21 February and 10 March 1760. The last evening was a royal command performance attended by the then Prince of Wales.

The original cast included David Garrick as Aemilius, Consul of Rome and Governor of Aquileia; Charles Holland and "Mr Austin" as his sons Titus and Paulus; and Susannah Cibber as Cornelia, the wife of Aemilius. Other parts were played by Astley Bransby (Dumnorix); Thomas Davies (Varus); John Hayman Packer (Lucius); and Henry Scrase (Gartha).

The action of the play revolves around the tragic theme "of public duty in conflict with domestic loyalty" in a plot borrowed not so much from the actual history of the 3rd century siege of Aquileia as from incidents during the 1333 siege of Berwick. As such it resembles Edward Jerningam's The Siege of Berwick of 1793, which was based on the same historical account.

== Plot ==
In Home's play, the governor of Aquileia is Aemilius, whose son Titus makes a diversionary attack against the besieging army. As Titus is on the point of being overwhelmed, his brother Paulus comes to the rescue, but both are captured, much to the distress of their mother Cordelia. The enemy commander, the usurping emperor Maximin, then threatens to execute the brothers unless their father surrenders, which Aemilius refuses to do despite Cordelia's pleas. Now the enemy messenger reveals himself as Varus, an old friend of Cordelia's, who promises to do what he can to preserve the lives of her sons. Later Varus returns with the terms that they will be spared if Aemilius will give the city up within three days; meanwhile Varus plans to engineer a mutiny among the besiegers. Now Titus is sent to persuade his father to give in, but cannot gain a hearing until he makes it plain that he opposes any such capitulation. When Varus's plot is discovered he is executed, but the troops under his command join those of Aemilius against Maximin, who is killed. Cordelia has at first taken the death of Varus for that of a son, but her relief is short-lived as Paulus enters with the mortally wounded Titus. Finally both parents agree in acknowledging with dignity their "mingled state of triumph, and of sorrow".

== Response ==
The writer for The Critical Review noted approvingly that the play kept to the Classical unities of place, time and action, by which more is reported than takes place on stage. "The play abounds with noble sentiments and picturesque description; and though some critics may consider it deficient in the sublime, all must allow it to be rich in the pathetic." However, even he became tired of following the ups and downs of Cordelia's moods.

The guarded though favourable reaction to the play might be put down to patriotic recognition of "how the private concern of family affection is strictly connected with political reality and with the protection of the state". It is in the context of the Seven Years' War then being waged that Garrick announces in the Prologue:

Now, when the world resounds with loud alarms,
When victory sits plan'd on Britain's arms,
Be war our theme: the hero's glorious toil…
Whilst warm remembrance aids the poet's strain,
And England weeps for English heroes slain.

The text of the play was published in the year of its production along with two others by Home, and later in his complete dramatic works in 1798. But history had now moved on and by 1809 John Aikin's Athenaeum was describing the play as "a tame performance", while in 1830 the Edinburgh Encyclopædia was reporting that "it was acted with indifferent success". However, a more recent argument has been made that the play provides a superior presentation of the conflict between public virtue and private loyalty, convincing in terms of Classical rather than modern drama, and merits study as such.

== Bibliography ==
- Home, John. The Siege of Aquileia (1760)
- Home, John. The Siege of Aquileia, 18th Century Collections online
- Royle, Trevor. Macmillan Companion to Scottish Literature. Macmillan, 1984.
