= The Battle of Hastings (play) =

1778 play

- Original language: English
- Written by: Richard Cumberland
- Genre: Tragedy

Premiere
- Date: 24 January 1778
- Place: Theatre Royal, Drury Lane, London

The Battle of Hastings is a 1778 play by the English writer Richard Cumberland. It is a tragedy set around the Battle of Hastings in 1066. It was staged at the Drury Lane Theatre in October 1778 by Richard Brinsley Sheridan. Sheridan later mocked Cumberland's sensitivity to criticism by modelling the character Sir Fretful Plagiary, in his 1779 play The Critic, after him.

The original Drury Lane cast included Robert Bensley as Harold Godwinson, John Henderson as Edgar Atheling, John Palmer as Earl Edwin, William Brereton as Prince Waltheof, James Aickin as Earl of Northumberland, Richard Hurst as Raymond, Elizabeth Younge as Matilda and Mary Ann Yates as Edwina.

== Bibliography ==
- Baines, Paul & Ferraro, Julian & Rogers, Pat. The Wiley-Blackwell Encyclopaedia of Eighteenth-Century Writers and Writing, 1660-1789. Wiley-Blackwell, 2011.
- Hogan, C.B (ed.) The London Stage, 1660–1800: Volume V. Southern Illinois University Press, 1968.
- Mudford, William. The Life of Richard Cumberland. Sherwood, Neely & Jones, 1812.
- Nicoll, Allardyce. A History of English Drama 1660-1900. Volume III: Late Eighteenth Century Drama. Cambridge University Press, 1952.
