= Fumoto no iro =

Fumoto no iro (麓の色 Sex in the Foothills) is a novel and treatise on homosexual behavior (nanshoku (男色)) published in Japan in 1768 that tells the story of a sixty-year-old gigolo named Ogiya Yashige. Though fictional, Yashige is considered a precursor to modern Japanese notions of sexual morality, which dictate that (gay) male prostitutes are already past their prime at seventeen years of age. Pubescent boys were anal penetrators; pre-pubescent boys were to be penetrated.
