= The Rival Sisters (Murphy play) =

1793 play

- Original language: English
- Written by: Arthur Murphy
- Genre: Tragedy
- Setting: Naxos, Ancient Greece

Premiere
- Date: 8 March 1793
- Place: Theatre Royal, Haymarket, London

The Rival Sisters is a 1793 tragedy by the Irish writer Arthur Murphy. His final play, it premiered at the Theatre Royal, Haymarket in London on 18 March 1793. It had been first written in 1783 and then published in 1786. It was staged by the company of the Drury Lane company under Richard Brinsley Sheridan who were at the Haymarket while their own theatre was rebuilt. The London cast included Sarah Siddons as Ariadne, Jane Powell as Phaedra, John Philip Kemble as Perithous, Richard Wroughton as Periander, King of Naxos, Robert Palmer as Theseus, John Hayman Packer as Archon and Thomas Caulfield as Aletes. It ran for around nine performances.

== Bibliography ==
- Greene, John C. Theatre in Dublin, 1745-1820: A Calendar of Performances, Volume 6. Lexington Books, 2011.
- Emery, John Pike. Arthur Murphy: An Eminent English Dramatist of the Eighteenth Century. University of Pennsylvania Press, 1946.
- Nicoll, Allardyce. A History of English Drama 1660–1900: Volume III. Cambridge University Press, 2009.
- Hogan, C.B (ed.) The London Stage, 1660–1800: Volume V. Southern Illinois University Press, 1968.
