= Braganza (play) =

1775 play by Robert Jephson

- Original language: English
- Written by: Robert Jephson
- Genre: Tragedy
- Setting: Lisbon, seventeenth century

Premiere
- Date: 17 February 1775
- Place: Theatre Royal, Drury Lane, London

Braganza is a 1775 tragedy by the Irish writer Robert Jephson. It portrays the overthrow of Spanish rule in Portugal during the seventeenth century, leading to the establishment of the Braganza Dynasty. The original Drury Lane cast included Mary Ann Yates as Duchess, William Smith as Velasquez, John Palmer as Ribiro, James Aickin as Almada, John Hayman Packer as Ramirez, William Brereton as Mendoza, Howard Usher as Lemos, Richard Hurst as Corea, James Wrighten as Antonio and Samuel Reddish as Duke. The prologue was written by Arthur Murphy.

== Bibliography ==
- Nicoll, Allardyce. A History of English Drama 1660–1900: Volume III. Cambridge University Press, 2009.
- Hogan, C.B (ed.) The London Stage, 1660–1800: Volume V. Southern Illinois University Press, 1968.
