= The Fatal Falsehood =

1779 play

- Original language: English
- Written by: Hannah More
- Genre: Tragedy

Premiere
- Date: 7 May 1779
- Place: Theatre Royal, Covent Garden, London

The Fatal Falsehood is a 1779 verse drama tragedy by the British writer Hannah More. It premiered at the Theatre Royal, Covent Garden in London on 7 May 1779. The original cast included Matthew Clarke as Earl Guilford, William Thomas Lewis as Rivers, his son, Richard Wroughton as Orlando, a young Italian Count, Francis Aickin as Bertrand, Elizabeth Younge as Emmelina and Elizabeth Hartley as Julia. The prologue was written by Richard Brinsley Sheridan.

Like all of More's plays, the dramatis personae is very small, with only six named roles. As with all of her "serious" tragedies, only the prologues and epilogues are in rhyming couplets, while the entire action is written in blank verse. Once more, More undermines her own work in the prologue, spoken by Mr. Hull:

Nor does she emulate the loftier strains

Which high heroic Tragedy maintains:

Nor conquests she, nor wars, nor triumphs sings,

Nor with rash hand o'erturns the thrones of kings [...]

The scenes of private life our author shows,

A simple story of domestic woes [...]

== Bibliography ==
- DeRochi, Jack E. & Ennis Daniel James (ed.) Richard Brinsley Sheridan: The Impresario in Political and Cultural Context. Rowman & Littlefield, 2013.
- Greene, John C. Theatre in Dublin, 1745-1820: A Calendar of Performances, Volume 6. Lexington Books, 2011.
- Nicoll, Allardyce. A History of English Drama 1660–1900: Volume III. Cambridge University Press, 2009.
- Hogan, C.B (ed.) The London Stage, 1660–1800: Volume V. Southern Illinois University Press, 1968.
