= Zenobia (play) =

1768 play by Arthur Murphy

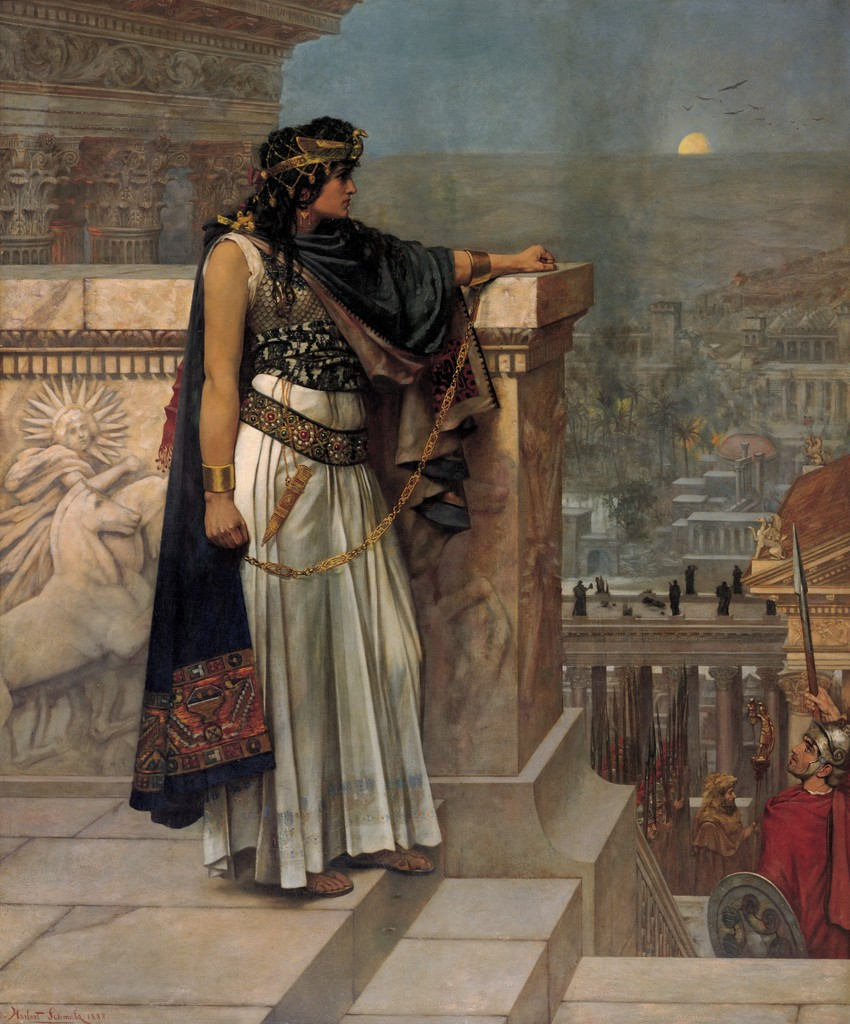
- The play's heroine Queen Zenobia in Zenobia's Last Look on Palmyra by Herbert Gustave Schmalz, 1888
- Original language: English
- Written by: Arthur Murphy
- Genre: Tragedy

Premiere
- Date: 27 February 1768
- Place: Theatre Royal, Drury Lane

Zenobia is a 1768 tragedy by the Irish writer Arthur Murphy. It is based on the life of Zenobia, ruler of the Palmyrene Empire in Syria and her defiance of Ancient Rome.

The original Drury Lane cast included Ann Street Barry as Zenobia, Spranger Barry as Rhadamistus, Charles Holland as Teribarzus, Francis Aickin as Pharasmanes, William Havard as Megistus, John Hayman Packer as Zopiron and Richard Hurst as Tigranes.

== Bibliography ==
- Nicoll, Allardyce. A History of English Drama 1660–1900: Volume III. Cambridge University Press, 2009.
- Hogan, C.B (ed.) The London Stage, 1660–1800: Volume V. Southern Illinois University Press, 1968.
- Southern, Pat. Empress Zenobia: Palmyra’s Rebel Queen. A&C Black, 2008.
