= All in the Wrong =

1761 play

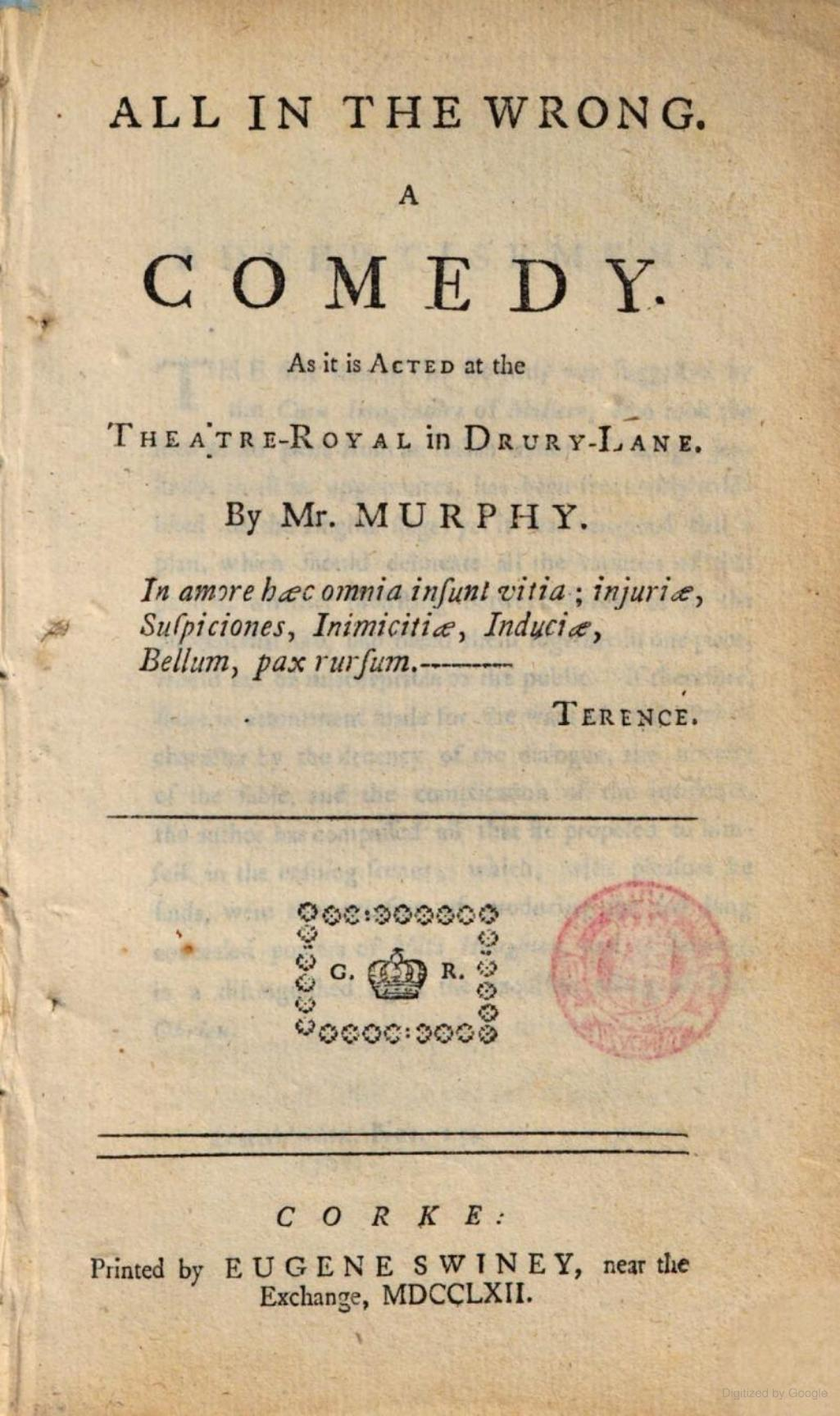
- Written by: Arthur Murphy
- Original language: English
- Genre: Comedy
- Setting: London, present day

Premiere
- Date premiered: 15 June 1761
- Place premiered: Theatre Royal, Drury Lane, London

All in the Wrong is a 1761 comedy play by the Irish writer Arthur Murphy. It premiered at the Theatre Royal, Drury Lane in London, the under the management of David Garrick, on 15 June 1761. The original cast included Richard Yates as Sir John Restless, William O'Brien as Beverley, John Hayman Packer as Young Bellmont, Thomas Weston as Brush, Servant to Beverley, Astley Bransby as Blandford, Charles Blakes as Robert, Hannah Haughton as Lady Restless, Mary Ann Yates as Belinda, Mary Bradshaw as Tattle, Servant to Lady Restless and Jane Hippesley as Tippet, Servant to Belinda.

== Bibliography ==
- Emery, John Pike. Arthur Murphy: An Eminent English Dramatist of the Eighteenth Century. University of Pennsylvania Press, 1946.
- Nicoll, Allardyce. A History of English Drama 1660–1900: Volume III. Cambridge University Press, 2009.
- Hogan, C.B (ed.) The London Stage, 1660–1800: Volume V. Southern Illinois University Press, 1968.
