= The Grecian Daughter =

1772 tragedy by Arthur Murphy

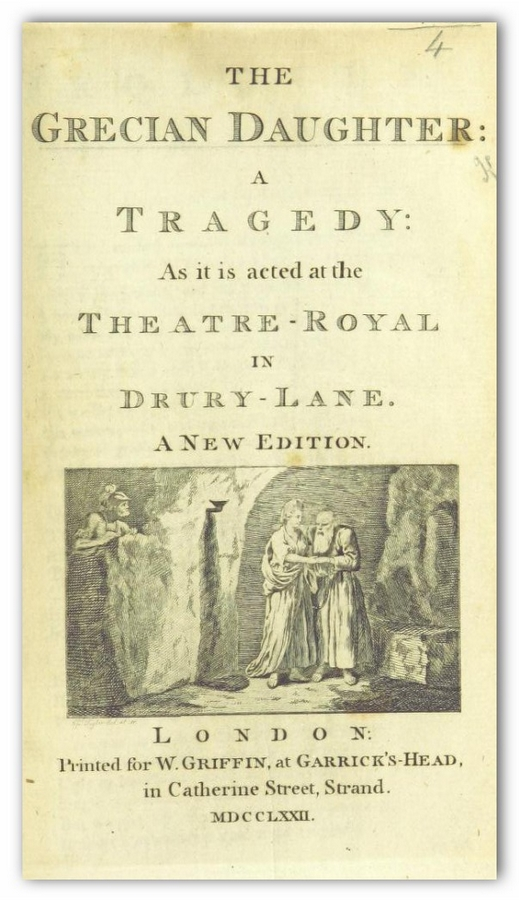
- Original language: English
- Written by: Arthur Murphy
- Genre: Tragedy

Premiere
- Date: 26 February 1772
- Place: Theatre Royal, Drury Lane

The Grecian Daughter is a 1772 tragedy by the Irish writer Arthur Murphy. It was widely performed for nearly sixty years, through the 1830s. For many British actresses in the eighteenth century, playing the role of the central heroine, Euphrasia, was an important part of gaining fame.

Murphy began writing the play in 1769. David Garrick encouraged Murphy to finish it in time for that year's theatrical season, but Murphy delayed in an (unsuccessful) attempt to convince Garrick to stage his play Alzuma instead. Rehearsals began in late January 1772, and the play was first performed on 26 February.

== Synopsis ==
The play, set in ancient Sicily, opens with the King of Syracuse Evander having been imprisoned by a usurper, Dionysius. Evander's daughter, Euphrasia, is dedicated to his rescue. Euphrasia's husband and infant son have escaped the city, but Euphrasia remains, and at night climbs a mountain to reach the cave in which her father is being held with no food or drink. She persuades his guards to allow her to see him. Finding her father weak from starvation, Euphrasia breast-feeds him to save his life. As military aid approaches to free Syracuse from Dionysius, Euphrasia helps her father escape his prison and hides him in her mother's tomb. Dionysius schemes to kill the soldiers of the opposing army during a false truce, and tells Euphrasia that he will make her watch him murder Evander. Euphrasia draws a concealed dagger, and stabs Dionysius. His death serves to rescue Evander and the city. Euphrasia is happily reunited with her husband and son, and Evander names her his heir for the throne.

== Casting ==
Sarah Siddons as Euphrasia by William Hamilton, 1780

In the original Drury Lane performance in 1772, the heroine Euphrasia was played by Ann Street Barry, and Euphrasia's father Evander was played by Barry's husband Spranger Barry. Other cast members included John Palmer as Dionysius, Samuel Reddish as Philotus, Joseph Inchbald as Callipus, Francis Aickin as Melathon, James Aickin as Phocion, John Hayman Packer as Greek Herald and Richard Hurst as Arcas.

The actress Sarah Siddons frequently performed as Euphrasia, as part of her repertoire of tragic parts, and it became known as one of her "great roles". She was painted as Euphrasia in a portrait by William Hamilton in 1780 which was the basis of a line engraving by James Caldwell in 1789.

Ann Brunton Merry's debut performance was as Euphrasia at the Theatre Royal in Bath, 17 February 1785. The role of Euphrasia was also later performed by her niece, Elizabeth Yates.

In the early 1830s, Fanny Kemble played Euphrasia with her father Charles Kemble as Evander.

== Bibliography ==
- Alper, Victor M. (1973). ARTHUR MURPHY, TRAGEDIAN: A CRITICAL EDITION OF "THE GRECIAN DAUGHTER." - ProQuest (Thesis).
- Nicoll, Allardyce. A History of English Drama 1660–1900: Volume III. Cambridge University Press, 2009.
- Burroughs, Catherine (2006). ""The Father Foster'd at His Daughter's Breast": Fanny Kemble and The Grecian Daughter". Nineteenth-Century Contexts. 28 (4): 335–345. doi:10.1080/08905490601087044. ISSN 0890-5495.
- Hogan, C.B (ed.) The London Stage, 1660–1800: Volume V. Southern Illinois University Press, 1968.
- Knight, John Joseph (1900). "Yates, Elizabeth" . Dictionary of National Biography. Vol. 63. pp. 290–292.
- The Grecian Daughter at Project Gutenberg
