= Zingis (play) =

- Original language: English
- Written by: Alexander Dow
- Genre: Tragedy

Premiere
- Date: 17 December 1768
- Place: Theatre Royal, Drury Lane, London

Zingis is a 1768 tragedy by the British writer Alexander Dow. It is set during the reign of Genghis Khan.

The original Drury Lane cast included Charles Holland as Timur, Francis Aickin as Zingis, John Hayman Packer as Aunac, Samuel Reddish as Zemouca, Thomas Jefferson as Cubla, John Palmer as Zena, Charles Bannister as Nevian, Richard Hurst as Sidasco and Elizabeth Younge as Ovisa.

== Sources ==
In the Advertisement of the play, Dow purports to have adapted the play from a Persian history named "Tarich Mogulistan". No such manuscript by this name has been found to exist, and the wealth of fictional tribes, events, and characters reveal the play to be a pseudotranslation fabricated by Dow.

== Bibliography ==
- Nicoll, Allardyce. A History of English Drama 1660–1900: Volume III. Cambridge University Press, 2009.
- Hogan, C.B (ed.) The London Stage, 1660–1800: Volume V. Southern Illinois University Press, 1968.
