= Andrew Macdonald (poet) =

Scottish clergyman and writer

Andrew Macdonald (born Andrew Donald) (1757–1790), pen name Matthew Bramble, was a Scottish clergyman, poet and playwright.

== Early life and education ==
Andrew MacDonald was born on 27 February 1757, the son of George Donald, a market gardener. The family lived at the foot of Leith Walk, in Leith, the busy port for Edinburgh on the Firth of Forth. Andrew Donald (as he was then known) attended the Grammar School in Leith and at an early age he demonstrated a flair for music. The Donald family was Episcopalian; the non-juror Scottish Episcopal Church at this time was heavily proscribed following its support for Bonnie Prince Charlie in the Jacobite rising a few years before. After 1745 the Hanoverian Government passed laws to restrict Episcopalian clergy from officiating, unless they swore allegiance to the King.

Andrew attended Edinburgh University until 1775.

Another resident in Leith at this period was the Scottish Episcopalian bishop, Robert Forbes. The precocious gardener's son impressed Bishop Forbes, who sent him to study at the University of Edinburgh with a view to ordination. Although Scottish Episcopal ordination was officially banned at the time, Bishop Forbes ordained Andrew Donald into deacon's orders in 1775. It was at this time that the surname was changed to Macdonald (also written as M’Donald).

== Ministry ==
Andrew Macdonald spent a year as private tutor to the children of the Oliphants of Gask in Perthshire. Mr and Mrs Laurence Oliphant were influential Jacobites, and their daughter Carolina, Baroness Nairne, would later become celebrated for her popular Jacobite verse.

Macdonald left the Oliphants in about 1777 to become the Scottish Episcopal incumbent in the Lanarkshire city of Glasgow. Bishop Forbes having died in November 1775, Macdonald was ordained priest by Bishop William Falconer. At this time Glasgow had a thriving authorised ('qualified') Episcopal chapel, St Andrew's-by-the-Green, whilst Macdonald's small non-juror congregation assembled in a meeting-house in Stockwell Street. A book of his sermons from this period was published posthumously. Its preface states that Macdonald's talents were held in high esteem, and his private virtues generally respected.

Macdonald was without private means, and the non-juror congregation in Glasgow was too small to support him from seat-rents. He supplemented his income with writing, and took in student lodgers. William Erskine, Lord Kinneder, (the judge and mentor of Sir Walter Scott) lodged with Macdonald during his student days, and recounted that it was Macdonald who had instilled in him a passion for English literature. Macdonald was passionately fond of poetry and music; an accomplished violinist, he became a director of a music club in Glasgow.

== Writing ==
Macdonald first appeared in print as a poet in 1772 when he published Velina, a poetical fragment in imitation of the style of Edmund Spenser. A couple of years later he published a novel called The Independent, which was 'favourably spoken of by the majority of its readers'. Macdonald also wrote the play, Vimonda, a Tragedy.

Alexander Tytler (who met Macdonald several times 'in companies of literary people') recorded that Macdonald married a young girl in Glasgow who had been his maid-servant; the congregation did not approve and deserted his meeting-house. Macdonald became disgusted with his profession, resigned from his clerical duties, and moved to Edinburgh. It was in Edinburgh in 1787 that Vimonda was first performed, at the Theatre Royal. Walter Scott, who was aged sixteen in 1787, would later recall seeing Macdonald in James Sibbald's circulating library (where Scott was also to spot Robert Burns). In Edinburgh he became a friend of John Brown, the artist.

== London ==
After just a few months in Edinburgh Macdonald travelled south to London, where, on 5 September 1787, Vimonda opened at George Colman's theatre in the Haymarket, the principal characters played by Mr Bensley, Mr Aickin, Mr Kemble, Mr Johnson, Mr Bannister jun., Miss Woolery, and Mrs Kemble. A review the next day praised the acting. Another reviewer suggested that, whilst Vimonda had some of the faults of a first play, the playwright had promise.

With the composer William Shield he started work on an opera. To earn some money, Macdonald wrote for newspapers, mostly satirical pieces under the pseudonym Matthew Bramble (the name of a character in the novel Humphry Clinker, by fellow Scot, Tobias Smollett). Financial worries forced the family to move from Brompton to ‘a mean residence’ in Kentish Town. Although by nature buoyant, amiable, and engaging, the pressure of his hardships overwhelmed Macdonald, and ‘having no powerful friends to patronise his abilities, and suffering under the infirmities of a weak constitution, he fell victim, at the age of three and thirty, to sickness, disappointment and misfortune.’ Andrew Macdonald died on 22 August 1790, leaving his wife and young child destitute.

== Legacy ==
The Independent appeared in German translation in 1789. In 1805, in the United States, William Ioor recast the same novel as a comedy in five acts. Under the title, Laura, Macdonald's 1782 sonnet appeared in The Wiccamical Chaplet by George Huddesford (1804), followed by another sonnet, The return of Laura, not by Macdonald. A snatch of a ballad by Macdonald was quoted by Sir Walter Scott in chapter 11 of Waverley (1814). Two stanzas by the ingenious and unhappy Andrew Macdonald appear in chapter 21 of Scott's 1819 novel A Legend of Montrose; a German translation of the Macdonald verses provided Franz Schubert with the text for his song, Lied der Anne Lyle (D830, 1825). Joseph Haydn made an arrangement of another Macdonald song, By the stream so cool and clear (St Kilda Song) (Hob. XXXIa, 19).

== Publications ==
- Velina, a poetical fragment, Edinburgh, 1782; published with the ninety-nine stanzas of Velina are a sonnet (Deep shelter'd in thy native forest green), the Ode on the Scots Music (What words, my Laura, can express), and On a Lady Sleeping (Where my Laura is laid).
- The Independent (a novel), 1784.
- Vimonda, a Tragedy in five acts and in verse (a play), printed in London and Dublin, 1788.
- Laura (a novel), 1790?.
- Twenty-eight Miscellaneous Sermons by Andrew Macdonald, London, 1790, with 1793 edition as Twenty-nine Miscellaneous Sermons.
- The Miscellaneous Works of A. M’Donald, including the Tragedy of Vimonda, and those productions which have appeared under the signature of Matthew Bramble, Esq., with various other compositions by the same author, London, 1791. (Included in this volume is the unfinished The Fair Apostate (a tragedy), Princess of Tarento (a comedy), Love and Loyalty (an opera), and Probationary Odes for the Laureateship.)
- A supplement to the works of Peter Pindar, Esq. being a select collection of humorous poems which have appeared under the signature of Matthew Bramble, Esq., London, 1797.
- Four poems by A. Macdonald of Glasgow in the second volume of Poetry; Original and Selected, published in Glasgow by Brash and Reid, 1797?: Ode on the Scotish Music (see Velina above) and The Power of Harmony (stanzas 78-81 from Velina ); The comforts of an inn (When early the sun sinks in winter to bed); and The Parsonage (Not remote from a church where the peasants implore).

== Sources ==
- Alexander Campbell: An Introduction to the History of Poetry in Scotland, Edinburgh, 1798.
- Ed. Joseph Robertson: Lives of Scottish Poets, London, 1822.
- Ralston Inglis: The Dramatic Writers of Scotland, Glasgow 1868.
