= Alexander Dow =

Scottish Orientalist, writer, playwright and army officer

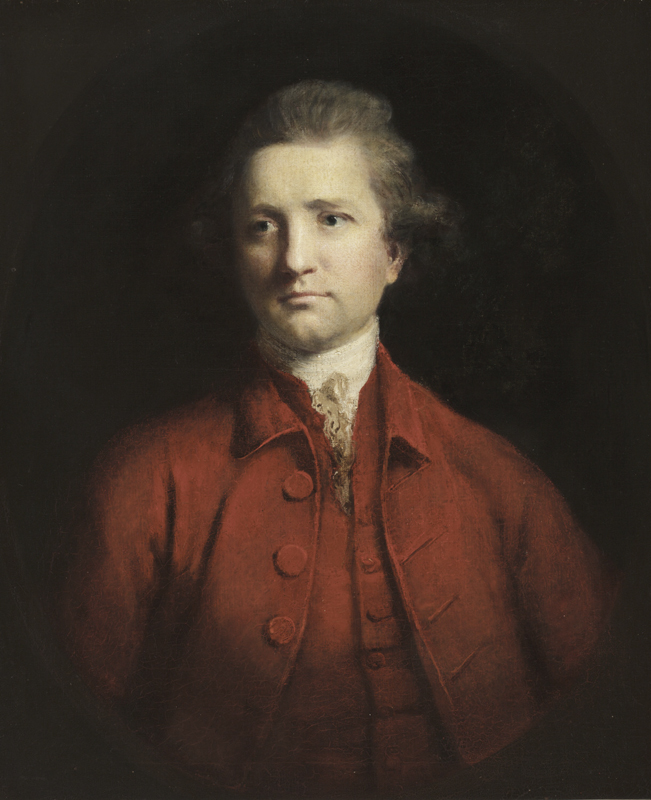
- Dow by Joshua Reynolds, 1771
- Born: 1735 or 1736; Crieff, Scotland, Great Britain
- Died: 31 July 1779 (aged 42-44); Bhagalpur, Bengal
- Military career
- Allegiance: Great Britain
- Service years: 1760-1769

Alexander Dow (1735 or 1736 – 31 July 1779) was a Scottish Orientalist, writer, playwright and army officer in the East India Company.

Dow was born in Crieff, Perthshire into the family of a customs official. He abandoned his mercantile studies and left Scotland (allegedly after being involved in a fatal duel), joining the military service of the East India Company and arriving in Bengal in 1760. Having achieved the rank of captain in 1764, he returned to Britain in 1768 and published the first two volumes of History of Hindostan, a translation of the Persian history of Firishta along with his own essay on Hindu religion and philosophy, which was influential in its time. He also wrote a tragedy, Zingis, which was staged with some success at Drury Lane.

Returning to India in 1769, Dow made his fortune in Bengal and bought a house in Bombay. He returned to Britain by the overland route in 1771–1772 and published the third volume of his History of Hindostan. He included with this work an essay on affairs in Bengal, participating in the public debate over the role of the East India Company in India. He made various proposals for reform in Bengal based on his mercantilist views. Receiving the rank of lieutenant-colonel from the Company, he travelled to India again in 1773 and served in Bengal. Reversals in his career led him to support Philip Francis, Governor Warren Hastings' adversary in the Supreme Council of Bengal. Dow fought in the Anglo-French War in 1778, commanding British forces at the siege of Chandernagore. His health worsened later that year, and he died in Bhagalpur in July 1779.

== Early life and first journey to India ==
Alexander Dow was born in Crieff, Perthshire. His father worked in customs at Dunbar. Dow was being educated for a career as a merchant in Eyemouth, but in 1757 he abruptly left aboard the King of Prussia, a private ship of war, as a midshipman. The reason for this turn of events is not known; it has been claimed that he was obliged to leave after being involved in a fatal duel. Three years later, he arrived in Bengal, according to some sources, after having entered the military service of the East India Company in Bencoolen. He was promoted to ensign soon after joining in 1760, then to lieutenant in 1763, and in 1764 he was appointed captain and raised the 19th sepoy battalion at Murshidabad. On 2 December 1764, he participated in the attack on the Chunar Fort and received a wound which fractured his skull. In 1766 he was one of a group of officers who protested against Governor Robert Clive's abolition of the double field allowance. This was probably the reason for his return to Britain in 1768.

== Literary activity and second journey to India ==
After his return to Britain in 1768, Dow published two translations: Tales Translated from the Persian of Inatulla of Delhi, and the first two volumes of History of Hindostan, Translated from the Persian of Ferishta. Both works had a great success. To History of Hindostan Dow attached his own dissertation on Hindu religion and philosophy and an account of the last forty years of the history of the Mughal Empire. His dissertation gained widespread recognition and was reviewed and discussed many times in Britain, although it did not contribute significantly to existing knowledge of Hinduism. It influenced to some degree British views on India and its religion and philosophy before the more substantial researches of William Jones and other orientalists in the 1780s and '90s. It was also read by Voltaire and was published in French translation in 1769. John Shore, Dow's contemporary in Bengal, cast doubt on Dow's knowledge of Persian and assumed that he loosely rewrote the stories of Inatulla after having a Persian interpreter explain them to him. However, he regarded Dow's translation of Firishta to be "more correct, and in some parts exact." In 1769 Dow published a five-act tragedy, Zingis, which was staged with some success at Drury Lane.

In London Dow lived in the same dwelling as his fellow Scot James Macpherson, the author of the Ossian poems. Dow had as his servant John MacDonald, who stated in his memoirs, "My master spent so much money on women that I was tired of waiting on them." But he also described Dow as generous, and he agreed to follow Dow to Bombay in April 1769. Dow worked on the third volume of his History of Hindostan. According to MacDonald, Dow was able to converse with Indian princes in their own language and felt comfortable interacting with them as he "knew their ways". This indicates that his mastery of Persian "went beyond his having a capable interpreter." In India, according to MacDonald, Dow made his fortune in Bengal, "kept the best house in Bombay", and did not want for money. However, Dow disliked life in Bombay and in early 1771 asked for leave to accompany Eyre Coote on his overland journey to Britain. Along the way, the travellers suffered "fatiguing, dangerous and disagreeable accidents of detention".

Dow arrived in Britain in 1772 and published the third volume of his History of Hindostan, along with his two essays "A dissertation on the origin and nature of despotism in Hindostan" and "An enquiry into the state of Bengal, with a plan for restoring that Kingdom to its former prosperity and splendour". This contributed to the public outrage about the actions of the East India Company. Dow was critical of Governor Clive but spoke more positively of Clive's successor Harry Verelst. Nevertheless, he criticised the latter for failing to enact many necessary reforms. Dow main proposals for reform in Bengal were: the introduction of paper money to revive commerce; the "introduction" of property rights; the creation of a board of revenue; and the creation of a supreme court with jurisdiction over the entire territory. His plan for property rights in Bengal was an early example of the "ideal of the permanent settlement". Dow asserted that property did not exist in Bengal and imagined that all land was given out for tax farming on an annual basis, which led to the ruination of the peasants as tax farmers attempted to extract as much wealth as they could from their land while they had it. His proposal to conduct a general sale of all land in Bengal "was an outrage that was bound to provoke criticism" and was not shared by all other advocates of a "permanent settlement". He argued that the measure would cause landowners to improve their lands and also increase their attachment to the British. He subscribed to mercantilist views on economics. In 1774, while Dow was in India, his verse tragedy Sethona, set in a mythic ancient Egypt, was staged by David Garrick at Drury Lane. It played for only nine nights. It has been alleged that Dow was not the actual author of this work.

== Final return to India and death ==
In March 1772, Dow was restored by the directors of the East India Company to the rank he would have held in Bengal if he had never been involved in the protest against Clive in 1766. He received the rank of lieutenant-colonel with a captain's pay until a lieutenant-colonel-level command opened up in Bengal. In 1773 he travelled to Madras aboard the Stormont. In 1775 he was appointed commissary-general, placing him in charge of the military stores of the Company's factories and stations in Bengal. Dow carried out his duties effectively but complained of low pay which required him to spend money from his private fortune. He was appointed commander of the Chunar Fort for a period of two years, but within a year he was replaced another officer. These career reversals pushed Dow to support Philip Francis, Governor Warren Hastings' adversary in the Supreme Council of Bengal. Dow was stationed at Barrackpore. After war began with France in 1778, Hastings, despite Dow's connection with Francis, tasked him with besieging French Chandernagore, which Dow did on 10 July 1778.

In late 1778 Dow left Calcutta because of his poor health. He was treated with mercury for a suspected liver condition. He died in Bhagalpur on 31 July 1779. Two years later an inventory was taken of his possessions in Bengal. His papers indicated a fortune of 146,720 rupees (approximately £18,000), but his administrators had been able to recover only half of that amount by that time.

== Works ==
- Tales Translated from the Persian of Inatulla of Delhi (1768)
- History of Hindostan (1768–1772, 3 vols.) – the first two volumes are a translation of Firishta's history, while the third volume is Dow's original work
- Zingis (1769) – tragedy in five acts
- Sethona (1774) – verse tragedy
