= Robert Jephson =

18th-century Irish politician and playwright

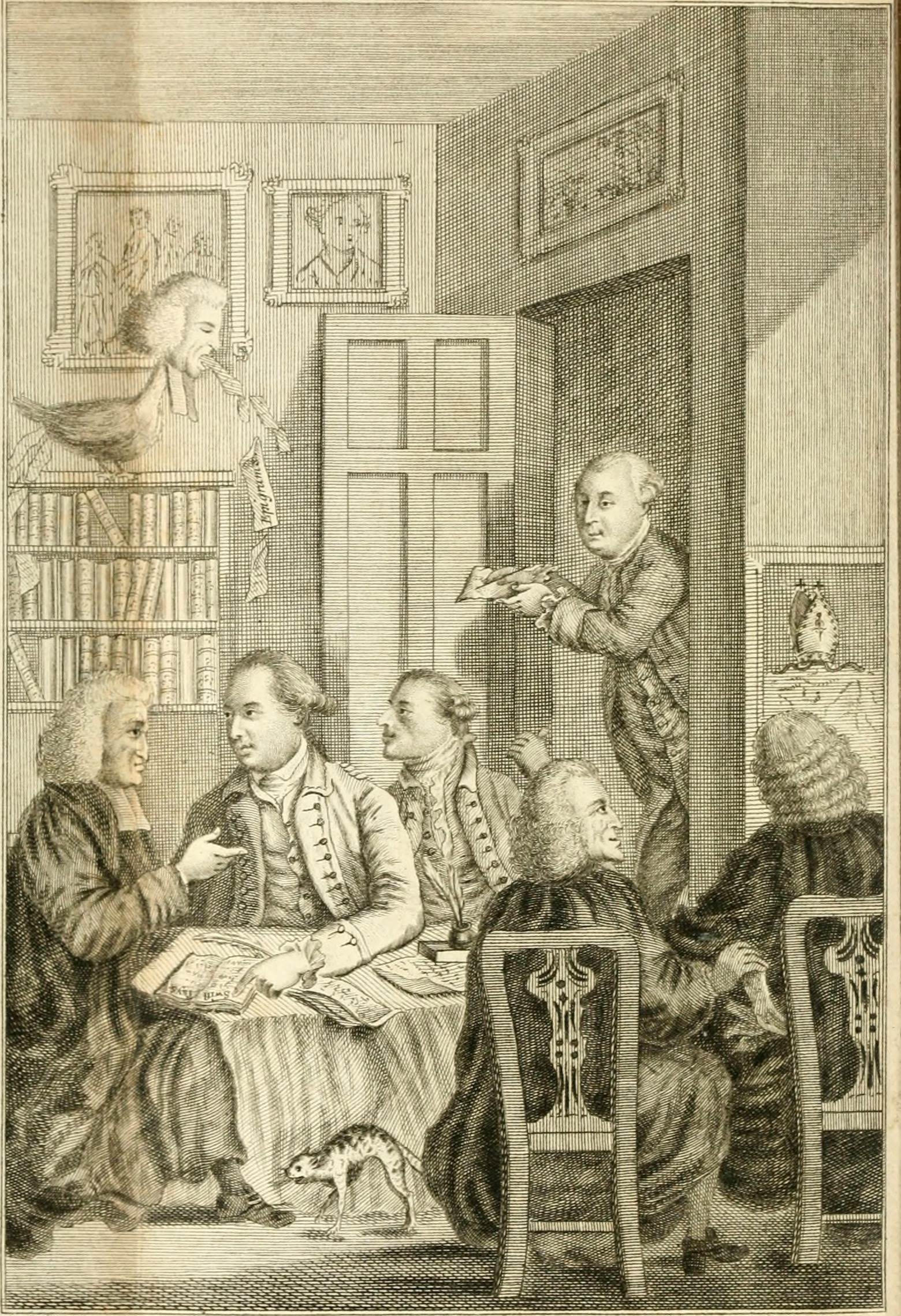
Select essays, from the Batchelor; or, Speculations of Jeoffry Wagstaffe, esq by Robert Jepson and John Courtenay (1772)

Robert Jephson (1736 – 31 May 1803) was an Irish dramatist and politician.

== Life ==
He was born in Ireland, a younger son of John Jephson, Archdeacon of Cloyne. He entered Trinity College, Dublin in 1751, but left without a degree. He then joined the British Army, with a commission in the 73rd Regiment of Foot (1758), and served in the Caribbean. He left, for health reasons.

Jephson then lived in England, at Hampton Court, with William Gerard Hamilton. There he was the friend of David Garrick, Joshua Reynolds, Oliver Goldsmith, Samuel Johnson, Edmund Burke, Charles Burney and Charles Townshend. His appointment as master of the horse to the lord-lieutenant of Ireland took him back to Dublin.

He published, in the Mercury newspaper, a series of articles in defence of the lord-lieutenant's administration which were afterwards collected and issued in book form under the title of The Bachelor, or Speculations of Jeoffry Wagstaffe. A pension of £300, later doubled, was granted him, and he held his appointment under twelve succeeding viceroys.

Jephson entered the Irish House of Commons in 1773 and sat for St Johnstown (County Longford) until 1776. Between 1777 and 1783, he served as Member of Parliament (MP) for Old Leighlin and subsequently represented Granard from 1783 to 1790. He died at Blackrock, near Dublin.

== Works ==
From 1775 Jephson took up writing plays. Among others, his tragedy Braganza was successfully performed at Drury Lane in 1775, The Conspiracy in 1796, Julia in 1797, The Law of Lombardy in 1779, and The Count of Narbonne at Covent Garden in 1781, adapted from Horace Walpole's The Castle of Otranto and The Campaign at the Smock Alley Theatre in 1784. In 1794 he published an heroic poem Roman Portraits, and The Confessions of Jacques Baptiste Couteau, a satire on the excesses of the French Revolution.

Parliament of Ireland
Preceded by Ralph Fetherston; Charles Newcomen	Member of Parliament for St Johnstown (County Longford); 1773–1776; With: Ralph Fetherston	Succeeded by Sir Ralph Fetherston, 1st Bt; Hon. John Vaughan
Preceded by Hugh Massy; Sir John Blaquiere	Member of Parliament for Old Leighlin; 1777–1783; With: Sir John Blaquiere	Succeeded by Hon. Henry Luttrell; Hon. Arthur Acheson
Preceded by Thomas Maunsell; William Long Kingsman	Member of Parliament for Granard; 1783–1790; With: George William Molyneux	Succeeded by John Ormsby Vandeleur; Thomas Pakenham Vandeleur
