= 1796 in literature =

Portrait of Pierre-Augustin Caron de Beaumarchais

This article contains information about the literary events and publications of 1796.

== Events ==
- January – The poet and antiquarian Charles Lamb ends a six-week spell in a mental asylum at Hoxton (London). In a letter to his friend Coleridge, Lamb proclaimed himself cured and rational, no longer biting other humans.
- February 29 – The Biblioteca Nacional de Portugal is established as the Royal Public Library of the Court in Lisbon.
- March 1 – Samuel Taylor Coleridge launches his periodical The Watchman.Published by Coleridge himself, it was printed at Bristol by Nathaniel Biggs, and appeared every eight days to avoid tax. Publication ceased with the tenth number (published 13 May 1796). The publication contained essays, poems, news stories, reports on Parliamentary debates, and book reviews. On 16 April, Coleridge's first poetry collection, Poems on Various Subjects, is published by the Bristol bookseller Joseph Cottle.In return for the copyright in the poems, Cottle paid Coleridge 30 guineas. Coleridge himself was more hopeful of gaining favourable notice from reviewers than large profits.
- March-April- Samuel Ireland publishes a collection of Shakespearean forgeries in his Miscellaneous Papers and Legal Instruments Under the Hand and Seal of William Shakespeare (dated this year but actually produced on 24 December 1795). On 17 November, 1795 Ireland and his son William Henry had carried the papers to St James's Palace, where the Duke of Clarence and Dorothea Jordan examined them, and on 30 December,1795 Ireland submitted them to the Prince of Wales at Carlton House.Two crushing blows came quickly. The first was the publication of the Irish Shakespearean scholar Edmond Malone's volume of over four hundred pages on 31 March 1796. Exposing the forgeries in detail, Malone showed one by one that each document was flawed in its handwriting, its language, its orthography, and its history. The spelling of the documents was not only not that of William Shakespeare's time, it was that of no time whatsoever. Numerous historical inaccuracies—not least of which was the reference to the Globe Theatre before that playhouse had been built—exposed the forger's ignorance. The supposed handwriting of Elizabeth I of England and of Shakespeare's patron Henry Wriothesley, 3rd Earl of Southampton did not at all resemble authentic examples. Words appearing in the forgeries (upset, for example) were not used in Shakespeare's time, or were used in a different sense than that of the papers.The second blow came two days later, on 2 April, with the failure of the play Vortigern and Rowena at the Drury Lane Theatre. The excitement was intense and the crowd volatile; tickets had sold out early and seats were hard to come by. While at first the play seemed to be a success with the audience, soon fits of laughter were heard and at one point the play came to a complete halt until order was restored. When the actor William Barrymore announced another performance of the play, the audience rebelled, and chaos reigned until the management substituted something else. William Henry Ireland blamed the actors, particularly John Philip Kemble, along with a "Malone faction," for the failure of his play. Others attributed it to the quality of the play itself. Vortigern's opening night was also its final performance at the time. It was not performed again until 2008. Some early critics accused William Henry Ireland's father Samuel of the forgery, though William assumed responsibility in two printed confessions. Samuel himself continued to regard the play as authentic and edited it in 1799, including a foreword in which he attacked Malone's findings and denounced the "illiberal and injurious treatment" he had received.
- July 21 – The Scottish national poet, Robert Burns, dies in Dumfries at the age of 37. His funeral (with honours as a military volunteer) takes place on July 25, while his wife, Jean, is in labour with their ninth child together, Maxwell. Burns is at first buried in the far corner of St Michael's Churchyard in Dumfries. The volume of The Scots Musical Museum published this year includes his versions of "Auld Lang Syne" and "Charlie Is My Darling".
- July 30 – A performance of a historical drama, Jane Shore, is given in Sydney, Australia; the playbill, printed by George Hughes, is the earliest known surviving item printed in that country.
- September 22 – Mary Lamb commits matricide.
- October
  - Jane Austen begins writing First Impressions, the first version of Pride and Prejudice (published 1813).
  - Caroline von Wolzogen's novel Agnes von Lilien begins anonymous serialization in the monthly Die Horen, edited by her brother-in-law Friedrich Schiller.

== New books ==
=== Fiction ===
- Robert Bage – Hermsprong: or, Man As He Is Not
- Elizabeth Bonhôte – Bungay Castle
- Fanny Burney – Camilla
- Denis Diderot (died 1784) – Jacques the Fatalist (the first complete edition of the original French, Jacques le fataliste et son maître)
- Marquis Carl von Grosse (translated by Peter Will) – Horrid Mysteries (translation of Der Genius)
- Elizabeth Hamilton – Translation of the Letters of a Hindoo Rajah
- Mary Hays – Memoirs of Emma Courtney
- Elizabeth Inchbald – Nature and Art
- Matthew Lewis – The Monk
- Eliza Parsons – The Mysterious Warning, a German Tale
- Regina Maria Roche – The Children of the Abbey: a Tale
- Jane West (as Prudentia Homespun) – A Gossip's Story, and a Legendary Tale

=== Children ===
- François Guillaume Ducray-Duminil – Victor, ou l’Enfant de la forêt (Victor, or The Child of the Forest)
- Maria Edgeworth – The Parent's Assistant (stories, second volume later in the year)
- Jane West – A Gossip's Story, and a Legendary Tale (as Prudentia Homespun)

=== Drama ===
- George Colman the Younger – The Iron Chest
- Richard Cumberland
  - Don Pedro
  - The Days of Yore
- Johann Wolfgang von Goethe – Egmont
- Thomas Holcroft
  - The Force of Ridicule
  - The Man of Ten Thousand
- William Henry Ireland – Vortigern and Rowena
- Robert Jephson – The Conspiracy
- Sophia Lee – Almeyda, Queen of Granada
- Thomas Morton – The Way to Get Married
- John O'Keeffe – The Doldrum
- John Penn – The Battle of Eddington
- Frederick Reynolds – Fortune's Fool
- Mary Darby Robinson – The Sicilian Lover
- The Iron Chest (adaptation of William Godwin's novel Caleb Williams)

=== Non-fiction ===
- Ralph Broome
  - Observations on Mr. Paine's Pamphlet Entitled the Decline and Fall of the English System of Finance...
  - Strictures on Mr. Burke's Two Letters, Addressed to a Member of the Present Parliament
- Edmund Burke – A Letter from The Right Honourable Edmund Burke to a Noble Lord, on the Attacks made upon him and his pension
- Edward Gibbon – Memoirs of My Life and Writings
- Susannah Willard Johnson – A Narrative of the Captivity of Mrs. Johnson (edited by John Curtis Chamberlain)
- John Gabriel Stedman – The Narrative of a Five Years Expedition against the Revolted Negroes of Surinam
- Mary Wollstonecraft – Letters Written in Sweden, Norway, and Denmark

== Births ==
- January 4 – Henry George Bohn, English bibliographer and publisher (died 1884)
- February 17 – Charlotte Anley, English didactic novelist and religious writer (died 1893)
- May 1 – Junius Brutus Booth, English-born actor (died 1852)
- May 4 – William H. Prescott, American historian (died 1859)
- August 19 – Agnes Strickland, English historical writer and poet (died 1874)
- September 19 – Hartley Coleridge, English poet, biographer and essayist (died 1849)
- July 15 – Thomas Bulfinch, American writer on mythology (died 1867)
- November 2 – Frederick Chamier, English novelist and Royal Navy captain (died 1870)
- December 19 – Manuel Bretón de los Herreros, Spanish playwright (died 1873)

== Deaths ==
- January 13 – John Anderson, Scottish natural philosopher and scientist (born 1726)
- February 17 – James Macpherson, Scottish poet (born 1736)
- March 6 – Guillaume Thomas François Raynal, French philosophical writer (born 1713)
- May 6 – Adolf Freiherr Knigge, German writer on etiquette (born 1752)
- June 7 – Elisabetta Caminèr Turra, Venetian writer and translator (born 1751)
- June 8 – Jean-Marie Collot d'Herbois, French dramatist (born 1749)
- July 21 – Robert Burns, Scottish poet (born 1759)
- October 7 – Thomas Reid, Scottish philosopher (born 1710)
- October 16 – Antoine-Joseph Pernety, French writer and mystic (born 1716)
- December 24 – John Maclaurin, Lord Dreghorn, judge and poet (born 1734)

== Sources ==
- Ashton, Rosemary (1996). The Life of Samuel Taylor Coleridge: A Critical Biography. Oxford: Blackwell. ISBN 9780631187462.
- Edmond Malone, An Inquiry into the Authenticity of Certain Miscellaneous Papers and Legal Instruments, London, 30 March 1796. (Page images at Internet Archive)
- Ireland, William Henry (1805). The Confessions of William Henry Ireland. Reprinted 2001. Elibron Classics. ISBN 1-4021-2520-8.
