= Bungay St Mary =

Coordinates: 52.4555°N 1.4379°E

- Civil parish
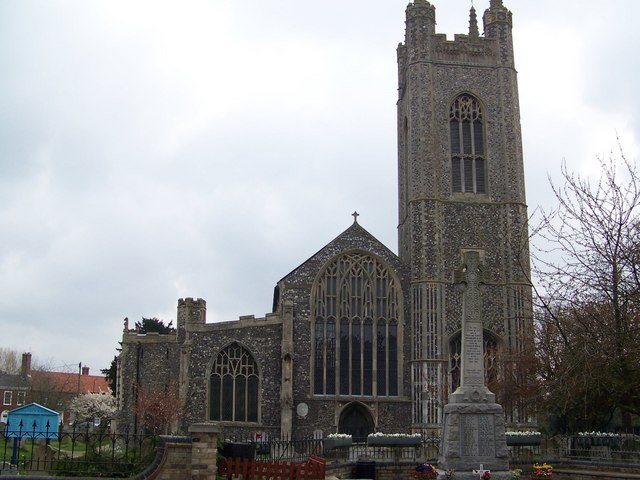
- Area
  - 1901: 590 acres (2.4 km^{2})
- Population
  - 1901: 1674
- History
  - Abolished: 1 April 1910
  - Succeeded by: Bungay
- Contained within
  - Rural district: Wangford Rural District

Bungay St Mary was a civil parish in the administrative county of East Suffolk, in Suffolk, England. At the 1901 census (the last before the abolition of the parish), Bungay St Mary had a population of 1674. The church, St Mary's Church is a Grade I listed building.

== History ==
Bungay St Mary was in the Wangford hundred. In 1894 Bungay St Mary became part of Wangford Rural District, and in 1889 Wangford Rural District became part of the administrative county of East Suffolk, on 1 April 1910 the parish was abolished and merged with Bungay Holy Trinity to form "Bungay" and became part of Bungay Urban District. In 1974 the area became part of Waveney non-metropolitan district in the non-metropolitan county of Suffolk. In 2019 it became part of East Suffolk district.
