= Listed buildings in Bungay =

Civil Parish in Suffolk, England

Bungay is a town and civil parish in the East Suffolk District of Suffolk, England. It contains 190 listed buildings that are recorded in the National Heritage List for England. Of these four are grade I, four are grade II* and 182 are grade II.

This list is based on the information retrieved online from Historic England.

== Key ==
Grade	Criteria
I	Buildings that are of exceptional interest
II*	Particularly important buildings of more than special interest
II	Buildings that are of special interest

== Listing ==
Name	Grade	Location	Type	Completed (Note: The date given is the date used by Historic England as significant for the initial building or that of an important part in the structure's description.)	Date designated	Grid ref. (Note: The grid reference is based on the British national grid reference system, sometimes known as OSGB36, used by the Ordnance Survey.) Geo-coordinates	Notes	Entry number (Note: The "List Entry Number" is a unique number assigned to each listed building and scheduled monument by Historic England.)	Image	Wikidata
St Edmund's Almshouse, Entrance Piers and Flanking Walls	II	8-22 Outney Road, NR35 1DZ			4 March 2021	TM3324889913; 52°27′26″N 1°25′54″E		1473080	St Edmund's Almshouse, Entrance Piers and Flanking Walls More images	Q106399254
10 Earsham Street Including 1a Broad Street	II	10 Earsham Street Including 1a Broad Street			2 August 1972	TM3357089869; 52°27′24″N 1°26′11″E		1234453	10 Earsham Street Including 1a Broad Street More images	Q26527855
Bungay Castle	I	NR35 1DD	castle		9 May 1949	TM3351189756; 52°27′21″N 1°26′08″E		1034404	Bungay Castle More images	Q17641605
Barn at Dukesbridge House, Adjacent at Rear	II	Adjacent At Rear, Beccles Road			2 August 1972	TM3439889487; 52°27′11″N 1°26′54″E		1034408	Upload Photo	Q26285949
Trinity Farmhouse	II	Annis Hill			9 May 1949	TM3543988956; 52°26′52″N 1°27′48″E		1034407	Upload Photo	Q26285948
Dukesbridge House	II	59 and 61, Beccles Road			2 August 1972	TM3441289471; 52°27′10″N 1°26′55″E		1365312	Upload Photo	Q26647009
Wall of Front Garden of Dukesbridge House	II	Beccles Road			2 August 1972	TM3441489458; 52°27′10″N 1°26′55″E		1365313	Upload Photo	Q26647010
1-7, Bridge Street	II	1-7, Bridge Street			2 August 1972	TM3365689844; 52°27′24″N 1°26′16″E		1034372	1-7, Bridge Street More images	Q26285914
2, Bridge Street	II	2, Bridge Street			2 August 1972	TM3366689840; 52°27′23″N 1°26′16″E		1034409	2, Bridge Street More images	Q26285950
4, 6a and 6b, Bridge Street	II	4, 6a and 6b, Bridge Street			2 August 1972	TM3367389848; 52°27′24″N 1°26′16″E		1034410	4, 6a and 6b, Bridge Street More images	Q26285951
12-16, Bridge Street	II	12-16, Bridge Street			2 August 1972	TM3369189860; 52°27′24″N 1°26′17″E		1365314	12-16, Bridge Street More images	Q26647011
17 and 21, Bridge Street	II	17 and 21, Bridge Street			2 August 1972	TM3369589883; 52°27′25″N 1°26′18″E		1034373	17 and 21, Bridge Street More images	Q26285915
18-22, Bridge Street	II	18-22, Bridge Street			2 August 1972	TM3370189867; 52°27′24″N 1°26′18″E		1365333	18-22, Bridge Street More images	Q26647029
Chequers Inn	II	23, Bridge Street	pub		2 August 1972	TM3370489892; 52°27′25″N 1°26′18″E		1234275	Chequers Inn More images	Q26527692
24 and 26, Bridge Street	II	24 and 26, Bridge Street			2 August 1972	TM3371989883; 52°27′25″N 1°26′19″E		1034367	24 and 26, Bridge Street More images	Q26285909
28-32, Bridge Street	II	28-32, Bridge Street			2 August 1972	TM3372889892; 52°27′25″N 1°26′19″E		1034369	28-32, Bridge Street More images	Q26285911
29, Bridge Street	II	29, Bridge Street			2 August 1972	TM3372189906; 52°27′25″N 1°26′19″E		1365338	29, Bridge Street More images	Q26647034
31 and 33, Bridge Street	II	31 and 33, Bridge Street			2 August 1972	TM3372989913; 52°27′26″N 1°26′20″E		1276176	31 and 33, Bridge Street More images	Q26565708
Bridge House	II	34, Bridge Street			9 May 1949	TM3375689907; 52°27′25″N 1°26′21″E		1365335	Bridge House More images	Q26686966
35 and 37, Bridge Street	II	35 and 37, Bridge Street			2 August 1972	TM3373989924; 52°27′26″N 1°26′20″E		1234283	35 and 37, Bridge Street More images	Q26527700
39-43, Bridge Street	II	39-43, Bridge Street			2 August 1972	TM3375089939; 52°27′26″N 1°26′21″E		1234285	39-43, Bridge Street More images	Q26527702
40-44, Bridge Street	II	40-44, Bridge Street			2 August 1972	TM3376289928; 52°27′26″N 1°26′21″E		1034371	40-44, Bridge Street More images	Q26285913
45, Bridge Street	II	45, Bridge Street			2 August 1972	TM3375689952; 52°27′27″N 1°26′21″E		1234286	45, Bridge Street More images	Q26527703
48, Bridge Street	II	48, Bridge Street			2 August 1972	TM3377289949; 52°27′27″N 1°26′22″E		1365337	48, Bridge Street More images	Q26647033
The Hermitage	II	50, Bridge Street, NR35 1HD			2 August 1972	TM3377489957; 52°27′27″N 1°26′22″E		1276206	Upload Photo	Q26565735
Railings and Gates of Number 34 (bridge House)	II	Bridge Street			2 August 1972	TM3374189908; 52°27′25″N 1°26′20″E		1365336	Upload Photo	Q26647032
Numbers 2 and 4 and Corner Cafe	II	Broad Street			2 August 1972	TM3363789833; 52°27′23″N 1°26′14″E		1234323	Numbers 2 and 4 and Corner Cafe More images	Q26527740
6, 8, and 8a, Broad Street	II	6, 8, And 8a, Broad Street			2 August 1972	TM3362089849; 52°27′24″N 1°26′14″E		1234287	6, 8, and 8a, Broad Street More images	Q26527704
10, Broad Street	II	10, Broad Street			2 August 1972	TM3360889868; 52°27′24″N 1°26′13″E		1234336	10, Broad Street More images	Q26527752
12-16, Broad Street	II	12-16, Broad Street			2 August 1972	TM3359489889; 52°27′25″N 1°26′12″E		1234288	12-16, Broad Street More images	Q26527705
15 and 17, Broad Street	II	15 and 17, Broad Street			2 August 1972	TM3350489943; 52°27′27″N 1°26′08″E		1234436	Upload Photo	Q26527839
Oxnead	II	18, Broad Street			2 August 1972	TM3356289914; 52°27′26″N 1°26′11″E		1234356	Oxnead More images	Q26527769
19, Broad Street	II	19, Broad Street			9 May 1949	TM3349589951; 52°27′27″N 1°26′07″E		1276179	Upload Photo	Q26565711
Cransford	II	20, Broad Street			9 May 1949	TM3354789928; 52°27′26″N 1°26′10″E		1276178	Upload Photo	Q26565710
30a and 30, Broad Street	II	30a and 30, Broad Street			2 August 1972	TM3352289954; 52°27′27″N 1°26′09″E		1234433	Upload Photo	Q26527836
Broad Street House	II	Broad Street			2 August 1972	TM3354689897; 52°27′25″N 1°26′10″E		1234290	Broad Street House More images	Q26527707
Front Wall of Courtyard of Number 16	II	Broad Street			2 August 1972	TM3357689895; 52°27′25″N 1°26′11″E		1234289	Upload Photo	Q26527706
Wall Garden, Conservatory, and Gazebo North West of Number 56	II	Conservatory, And Gazebo North West Of Number 56, Earsham Street			2 August 1972	TM3329089836; 52°27′24″N 1°25′56″E		1234584	Upload Photo	Q26527976
1 and 3, Cross Street	II	1 and 3, Cross Street			2 August 1972	TM3366189782; 52°27′21″N 1°26′16″E		1276180	1 and 3, Cross Street More images	Q26565712
2 and 4, Cross Street	II	2 and 4, Cross Street			2 August 1972	TM3365689766; 52°27′21″N 1°26′15″E		1276135	2 and 4, Cross Street More images	Q26565673
6, Cross Street	II	6, Cross Street			2 August 1972	TM3367589774; 52°27′21″N 1°26′16″E		1234291	Upload Photo	Q26527708
1 and 3, Earsham Street	II	1 and 3, Earsham Street			2 August 1972	TM3359489817; 52°27′23″N 1°26′12″E		1234440	1 and 3, Earsham Street More images	Q26527843
2, Earsham Street	II	2, Earsham Street	building		9 May 1949	TM3361789827; 52°27′23″N 1°26′13″E		1234452	2, Earsham Street More images	Q26527854
4-8, Earsham Street	II	4-8, Earsham Street			9 May 1949	TM3358489852; 52°27′24″N 1°26′12″E		1234532	4-8, Earsham Street More images	Q26527930
5, Earsham Street	II	5, Earsham Street			2 August 1972	TM3358489829; 52°27′23″N 1°26′12″E		1234292	5, Earsham Street More images	Q26527709
7, Earsham Street	II	7, Earsham Street			2 August 1972	TM3357489833; 52°27′23″N 1°26′11″E		1276099	7, Earsham Street More images	Q26565638
9 and 11, Earsham Street	II	9 and 11, Earsham Street			2 August 1972	TM3356189833; 52°27′23″N 1°26′10″E		1234445	9 and 11, Earsham Street More images	Q26527848
Earsham House	II	12, Earsham Street			9 May 1949	TM3356089867; 52°27′24″N 1°26′11″E		1234454	Earsham House More images	Q26527856
13, Earsham Street	II	13, Earsham Street			2 August 1972	TM3355589834; 52°27′23″N 1°26′10″E		1234446	13, Earsham Street More images	Q26527849
14, Earsham Street	II	14, Earsham Street			9 May 1949	TM3354889862; 52°27′24″N 1°26′10″E		1234455	14, Earsham Street More images	Q26527857
15, Earsham Street	II	15, Earsham Street			9 May 1949	TM3354089829; 52°27′23″N 1°26′09″E		1276100	15, Earsham Street More images	Q26565639
16, Earsham Street	II	16, Earsham Street			2 August 1972	TM3353989860; 52°27′24″N 1°26′09″E		1234456	16, Earsham Street More images	Q26527858
17, Earsham Street	II	17, Earsham Street			2 August 1972	TM3353489827; 52°27′23″N 1°26′09″E		1234447	17, Earsham Street More images	Q26527850
18, Earsham Street	II	18, Earsham Street			2 August 1972	TM3352789850; 52°27′24″N 1°26′09″E		1234576	18, Earsham Street More images	Q26527968
19, Earsham Street	II	19, Earsham Street			2 August 1972	TM3352789826; 52°27′23″N 1°26′09″E		1276101	19, Earsham Street More images	Q26565640
20 and 22, Earsham Street	II	20 and 22, Earsham Street			9 May 1949	TM3351389846; 52°27′24″N 1°26′08″E		1234577	20 and 22, Earsham Street More images	Q26527969
24 and 26, Earsham Street	II	24 and 26, Earsham Street			2 August 1972	TM3349189846; 52°27′24″N 1°26′07″E		1276046	24 and 26, Earsham Street More images	Q26565589
28 and 30, Earsham Street	II	28 and 30, Earsham Street			2 August 1972	TM3348189841; 52°27′24″N 1°26′06″E		1234578	Upload Photo	Q26527970
32-36, Earsham Street	II	32-36, Earsham Street			2 August 1972	TM3346689835; 52°27′24″N 1°26′05″E		1276047	32-36, Earsham Street More images	Q26565590
33, Earsham Street	II	33, Earsham Street			2 August 1972	TM3349589820; 52°27′23″N 1°26′07″E		1234448	33, Earsham Street More images	Q26527851
38, Earsham Street	II	38, Earsham Street			2 August 1972	TM3345889832; 52°27′23″N 1°26′05″E		1234579	38, Earsham Street More images	Q26527971
39 and 41, Earsham Street	II	39 and 41, Earsham Street			2 August 1972	TM3346789815; 52°27′23″N 1°26′05″E		1234449	39 and 41, Earsham Street More images	Q26527852
40, Earsham Street	II	40, Earsham Street			2 August 1972	TM3345289830; 52°27′23″N 1°26′05″E		1276048	40, Earsham Street More images	Q26565591
48, Earsham Street	II	48, Earsham Street			2 August 1972	TM3342189816; 52°27′23″N 1°26′03″E		1234580	48, Earsham Street More images	Q26527972
49, Earsham Street	II	49, Earsham Street			2 August 1972	TM3345889811; 52°27′23″N 1°26′05″E		1276102	49, Earsham Street More images	Q26565641
51 and 55, Earsham Street	II	51 and 55, Earsham Street			2 August 1972	TM3344889806; 52°27′23″N 1°26′04″E		1234506	51 and 55, Earsham Street More images	Q26527908
St Mary's School	II	54, Earsham Street			9 May 1949	TM3339789811; 52°27′23″N 1°26′02″E		1234581	St Mary's School More images	Q26527973
Waveney House	II	56, Earsham Street			9 May 1949	TM3336689803; 52°27′23″N 1°26′00″E		1234582	Upload Photo	Q26527974
57 and 59, Earsham Street	II	57 and 59, Earsham Street			2 August 1972	TM3342889799; 52°27′22″N 1°26′03″E		1276103	57 and 59, Earsham Street More images	Q26565642
61, 65 and 67, Earsham Street	II	61, 65 and 67, Earsham Street			2 August 1972	TM3340689785; 52°27′22″N 1°26′02″E		1234451	61, 65 and 67, Earsham Street More images	Q26527853
69 and 71, Earsham Street	II	69 and 71, Earsham Street			2 August 1972	TM3339789777; 52°27′22″N 1°26′02″E		1276104	69 and 71, Earsham Street More images	Q26565643
Bridge House	II	73, Earsham Street			2 August 1972	TM3338989762; 52°27′21″N 1°26′01″E		1234512	Bridge House More images	Q26527914
Ancilliary Building to West of Number 56	II	Earsham Street			2 August 1972	TM3333489804; 52°27′23″N 1°25′58″E		1234615	Upload Photo	Q26528004
K6 Telephone Kiosk Outside Post Office	II	Earsham Street			14 November 1990	TM3344989826; 52°27′23″N 1°26′05″E		1260894	K6 Telephone Kiosk Outside Post Office More images	Q26551879
Wall of Garden East of Number 56	II	Earsham Street			2 August 1972	TM3339489793; 52°27′22″N 1°26′02″E		1234655	Upload Photo	Q26528041
Wing Adjoining West of Number 56 (the Hollies)	II	Earsham Street			2 August 1972	TM3335389814; 52°27′23″N 1°25′59″E		1234583	Upload Photo	Q26527975
9, Flixton Road	II	9, Flixton Road			2 August 1972	TM3377889144; 52°27′01″N 1°26′20″E		1234587	Upload Photo	Q26527980
11, Flixton Road	II	11, Flixton Road			2 August 1972	TM3377689114; 52°27′00″N 1°26′20″E		1234680	Upload Photo	Q26528068
13, Flixton Road	II	13, Flixton Road			2 August 1972	TM3377789093; 52°26′59″N 1°26′20″E		1234588	Upload Photo	Q26527981
14, Flixton Road	II	14, Flixton Road			2 August 1972	TM3373589133; 52°27′00″N 1°26′18″E		1234665	Upload Photo	Q26528052
16, Flixton Road	II	16, Flixton Road			2 August 1972	TM3374189095; 52°26′59″N 1°26′18″E		1234586	Upload Photo	Q26527978
Fen Farm	II	Flixton Road, Constitution Hill			2 August 1972	TM3324388354; 52°26′36″N 1°25′50″E		1234693	Upload Photo	Q26528081
Stow Park	II	Flixton Road, Constitution Hill			9 May 1949	TM3271687979; 52°26′25″N 1°25′21″E		1234694	Upload Photo	Q26528082
The Lowlands	II	Flixton Road, Constitution Hill			9 May 1949	TM3342188495; 52°26′40″N 1°26′00″E		1234692	Upload Photo	Q26528080
Upland Hall	II	Flixton Road, Constitution Hill			2 August 1972	TM3337588074; 52°26′27″N 1°25′56″E		1234764	Upload Photo	Q26528146
2, Lower Olland Street	II	2, Lower Olland Street			2 August 1972	TM3372589580; 52°27′15″N 1°26′19″E		1275984	Upload Photo	Q26565530
41-45, Lower Olland Street	II	41-45, Lower Olland Street			2 August 1972	TM3380789522; 52°27′13″N 1°26′23″E		1234695	Upload Photo	Q26528083
52 and 54, Lower Olland Street	II	52 and 54, Lower Olland Street			2 August 1972	TM3382889462; 52°27′11″N 1°26′24″E		1234696	Upload Photo	Q26528084
58 and 60, Lower Olland Street	II	58 and 60, Lower Olland Street			2 August 1972	TM3384089446; 52°27′10″N 1°26′24″E		1275901	Upload Photo	Q26565454
Dunelm House	II	65, Lower Olland Street			2 August 1972	TM3389289428; 52°27′10″N 1°26′27″E		1234820	Upload Photo	Q26528200
Angel Inn	II	Lower Olland Street			2 August 1972	TM3373089598; 52°27′15″N 1°26′19″E		1275921	Angel Inn More images	Q26565472
National Westminster Bank	II	1 and 3, Market Place			2 August 1972	TM3366289823; 52°27′23″N 1°26′16″E		1234937	National Westminster Bank More images	Q26528306
King's Head Hotel	II	2, Market Place	hotel		9 May 1949	TM3360989805; 52°27′22″N 1°26′13″E		1234966	King's Head Hotel More images	Q26528336
4, Market Place	II	4, Market Place			2 August 1972	TM3361489795; 52°27′22″N 1°26′13″E		1234969	4, Market Place More images	Q26528339
5, Market Place	II	5, Market Place			2 August 1972	TM3365189806; 52°27′22″N 1°26′15″E		1234700	5, Market Place More images	Q26528088
6, Market Place	II	6, Market Place			2 August 1972	TM3361089786; 52°27′22″N 1°26′13″E		1216841	6, Market Place More images	Q26511594
7, Market Place	II	7, Market Place			9 May 1949	TM3364689794; 52°27′22″N 1°26′15″E		1275869	7, Market Place More images	Q26565424
8, Market Place	II	8, Market Place			2 August 1972	TM3361789778; 52°27′21″N 1°26′13″E		1216842	8, Market Place More images	Q26511595
9 and 11, Market Place	II	9 and 11, Market Place			9 May 1949	TM3364189787; 52°27′22″N 1°26′15″E		1275870	9 and 11, Market Place More images	Q26565426
Crowe	II	10, Market Place			2 August 1972	TM3361689766; 52°27′21″N 1°26′13″E		1275688	Upload Photo	Q26565251
11a, Market Place	II	11a, Market Place			9 May 1949	TM3364889779; 52°27′21″N 1°26′15″E		1275988	11a, Market Place More images	Q26565533
12, Market Place	II	12, Market Place			2 August 1972	TM3361389760; 52°27′21″N 1°26′13″E		1216843	12, Market Place More images	Q26511596
13, Market Place	II	13, Market Place			2 August 1972	TM3365289776; 52°27′21″N 1°26′15″E		1234702	13, Market Place More images	Q26528090
14, Market Place	II	14, Market Place			2 August 1972	TM3361289754; 52°27′21″N 1°26′13″E		1275689	14, Market Place More images	Q26565252
The Swan	II	16, Market Place	pub		2 August 1972	TM3360889746; 52°27′20″N 1°26′13″E		1216844	The Swan More images	Q26511597
17 and 19, Market Place	II	17 and 19, Market Place			2 August 1972	TM3364689760; 52°27′21″N 1°26′15″E		1275872	17 and 19, Market Place More images	Q26565428
21, Market Place	II	21, Market Place			2 August 1972	TM3364089757; 52°27′21″N 1°26′14″E		1275989	21, Market Place More images	Q26565534
Butter Cross	I	Market Place	buttercross		9 May 1949	TM3363689773; 52°27′21″N 1°26′14″E		1275987	Butter Cross More images	Q17527411
1 and 3, Nethergate Street	II	1 and 3, Nethergate Street			2 August 1972	TM3365489860; 52°27′24″N 1°26′15″E		1275690	1 and 3, Nethergate Street More images	Q26565253
Waveney Cottage	II	Outney Road			2 August 1972	TM3327289850; 52°27′24″N 1°25′55″E		1216846	Upload Photo	Q26511599
24-28, Priory Lane	II	24-28, Priory Lane			2 August 1972	TM3362789643; 52°27′17″N 1°26′13″E		1275691	Upload Photo	Q26565254
Barn at Duke's Farm	II	St John's Hill			2 August 1972	TM3469588557; 52°26′40″N 1°27′07″E		1216848	Upload Photo	Q26511601
Duke's Farmhouse	II	St John's Hill			2 August 1972	TM3468988598; 52°26′42″N 1°27′07″E		1216847	Upload Photo	Q26511600
4, St John's Road	II	4, St John's Road			2 August 1972	TM3393889291; 52°27′05″N 1°26′29″E		1216849	Upload Photo	Q26511602
22 and 24, St John's Road	II	22 and 24, St John's Road			2 August 1972	TM3402189193; 52°27′02″N 1°26′33″E		1275693	Upload Photo	Q26565255
Ollands and the Gables	II*	51, St John's Road			9 May 1949	TM3409189178; 52°27′01″N 1°26′37″E		1275692	Upload Photo	Q17546927
6, St Mary's Street	II	6, St Mary's Street			9 May 1949	TM3362089725; 52°27′20″N 1°26′13″E		1216942	6, St Mary's Street More images	Q26511693
The Fleece Hotel	II	8 and 10, St Mary's Street	hotel		2 August 1972	TM3363289711; 52°27′19″N 1°26′14″E		1216851	The Fleece Hotel More images	Q26511603
12, St Mary's Street	II	12, St Mary's Street			2 August 1972	TM3364289697; 52°27′19″N 1°26′14″E		1216852	Upload Photo	Q26511604
14-18, St Mary's Street	II	14-18, St Mary's Street			9 May 1949	TM3365189685; 52°27′18″N 1°26′15″E		1275665	14-18, St Mary's Street More images	Q26565229
20 and 22, St Mary's Street	II	20 and 22, St Mary's Street			2 August 1972	TM3366089673; 52°27′18″N 1°26′15″E		1275695	20 and 22, St Mary's Street More images	Q26565257
42-46, St Mary's Street	II	42-46, St Mary's Street			2 August 1972	TM3369089621; 52°27′16″N 1°26′17″E		1275642	42-46, St Mary's Street More images	Q26565208
48, St Mary's Street	II	48, St Mary's Street			2 August 1972	TM3369889608; 52°27′16″N 1°26′17″E		1216853	48, St Mary's Street More images	Q26511605
50 and 52, St Mary's Street	II	50 and 52, St Mary's Street			2 August 1972	TM3370289600; 52°27′16″N 1°26′17″E		1216988	50 and 52, St Mary's Street More images	Q26511731
56, St Mary's Street	II	56, St Mary's Street			2 August 1972	TM3371789589; 52°27′15″N 1°26′18″E		1275643	56, St Mary's Street More images	Q26565209
Bungay War Memorial	II	St Mary's Street, NR35 1AP	war memorial		12 September 2018	TM3364089729; 52°27′20″N 1°26′14″E		1458625	Bungay War Memorial More images	Q66479849
Church of St Mary (including Ruins of Benedictine Convent)	I	St Mary's Street	church building		9 May 1949	TM3368589733; 52°27′20″N 1°26′17″E		1216850	Church of St Mary (including Ruins of Benedictine Convent) More images	Q7594290
K6 Telephone Kiosk West End of St Mary's Churchyard	II	St Mary's Street			14 November 1990	TM3363389742; 52°27′20″N 1°26′14″E		1240724	Upload Photo	Q26533632
Presbytery to Roman Catholic Church of St Edmund	II	St Mary's Street	architectural structure		5 March 1998	TM3372389677; 52°27′18″N 1°26′19″E		1376755	Presbytery to Roman Catholic Church of St Edmund More images	Q26657279
Roman Catholic Church of St. Edmund	II*	St Mary's Street	Catholic church building		5 March 1998	TM3369589680; 52°27′18″N 1°26′17″E		1376754	Roman Catholic Church of St. Edmund More images	Q17547021
Wall on South Side of Churchyard of St Mary's Church	II	St Mary's Street			2 August 1972	TM3371789707; 52°27′19″N 1°26′18″E		1275694	Upload Photo	Q26565256
Wall on South West Side of St Edmund's Churchyard	II	St Mary's Street			2 August 1972	TM3367889668; 52°27′18″N 1°26′16″E		1216990	Upload Photo	Q26511733
Trinity Hall	II*	1, Staithe Road	house		9 May 1949	TM3384089648; 52°27′17″N 1°26′25″E		1216991	Trinity Hall More images	Q17546895
3, Staithe Road	II	3, Staithe Road			2 August 1972	TM3387089668; 52°27′17″N 1°26′26″E		1217033	Upload Photo	Q26511775
Dreyer Almshouses	II	9-17, Staithe Road, NR35 1ET			2 August 1972	TM3390889681; 52°27′18″N 1°26′28″E		1216994	Dreyer Almshouses More images	Q26511736
27, Staithe Road	II	27, Staithe Road			2 August 1972	TM3396189671; 52°27′17″N 1°26′31″E		1217148	Upload Photo	Q26511882
White Horse Inn	II	45, Staithe Road			9 May 1949	TM3403489657; 52°27′17″N 1°26′35″E		1275646	Upload Photo	Q26565212
51 and 53, Staithe Road	II	51 and 53, Staithe Road			2 August 1972	TM3407689689; 52°27′18″N 1°26′37″E		1216995	Upload Photo	Q26511737
Entrance Piers of Front Garden of Trinity Hall	II	Staithe Road			2 August 1972	TM3384589638; 52°27′17″N 1°26′25″E		1275645	Upload Photo	Q26565211
Front Wall of Courtyard East of Trinity Hall	II	Staithe Road			2 August 1972	TM3386089648; 52°27′17″N 1°26′26″E		1216992	Upload Photo	Q26511734
Wall of Garden of Trinity Hall Onto Trinity Street	II	Staithe Road			2 August 1972	TM3382089655; 52°27′17″N 1°26′24″E		1216993	Upload Photo	Q26511735
Ancillary Building East of Trinity Hall	II	Stathe Road			2 August 1972	TM3386089664; 52°27′17″N 1°26′26″E		1275644	Upload Photo	Q26565210
Manor Farmhouse (near Three Ash Farm)	II	Tinkswood Lane			2 August 1972	TM3416687847; 52°26′18″N 1°26′37″E		1217176	Upload Photo	Q26511907
Uplands Hall Farmhouse	II	Tinkswood Lane			2 August 1972	TM3343087295; 52°26′02″N 1°25′57″E		1216996	Upload Photo	Q26511738
The Tower Mill	II	Tower Mill Road	tower mill		2 August 1972	TM3384589042; 52°26′57″N 1°26′24″E		1275513	The Tower Mill More images	Q8563834
1 and 3, Trinity Street	II	1 and 3, Trinity Street			9 May 1949	TM3367289814; 52°27′23″N 1°26′16″E		1275612	Upload Photo	Q26565182
2, Trinity Street	II	2, Trinity Street			2 August 1972	TM3366289805; 52°27′22″N 1°26′16″E		1217650	Upload Photo	Q26512353
5, Trinity Street	II	5, Trinity Street			9 May 1949	TM3368589809; 52°27′22″N 1°26′17″E		1216998	5, Trinity Street More images	Q26511739
7, Trinity Street	II	7, Trinity Street			9 May 1949	TM3370589803; 52°27′22″N 1°26′18″E		1217293	7, Trinity Street More images	Q26512023
Trinity House	II	8, Trinity Street			9 May 1949	TM3378089663; 52°27′17″N 1°26′22″E		1217652	Upload Photo	Q26512355
10, Trinity Street	II	10, Trinity Street			2 August 1972	TM3381289638; 52°27′17″N 1°26′23″E		1217653	10, Trinity Street More images	Q26512356
11 and 13, Trinity Street	II	11 and 13, Trinity Street			9 May 1949	TM3371789786; 52°27′22″N 1°26′19″E		1275613	11 and 13, Trinity Street More images	Q26565183
14, Trinity Street	II	14, Trinity Street			2 August 1972	TM3381489609; 52°27′16″N 1°26′23″E		1217654	Upload Photo	Q26512357
15, Trinity Street	II	15, Trinity Street			9 May 1949	TM3372489780; 52°27′21″N 1°26′19″E		1275489	15, Trinity Street More images	Q26565069
16 and 18, Trinity Street	II	16 and 18, Trinity Street			2 August 1972	TM3383889623; 52°27′16″N 1°26′25″E		1217655	Upload Photo	Q26512358
17, Trinity Street	II	17, Trinity Street			9 May 1949	TM3373389773; 52°27′21″N 1°26′19″E		1216999	17, Trinity Street More images	Q26511740
19, Trinity Street	II	19, Trinity Street			9 May 1949	TM3374589765; 52°27′21″N 1°26′20″E		1275492	19, Trinity Street More images	Q26565071
Church of Holy Trinity	I	Trinity Street	church building		9 May 1949	TM3382089714; 52°27′19″N 1°26′24″E		1216997	Church of Holy Trinity More images	Q17527399
Front Wall of Drive of Number 19	II	Trinity Street			2 August 1972	TM3375189756; 52°27′21″N 1°26′20″E		1275299	Upload Photo	Q26564902
Outbuildings at Rear of Number 19	II	Trinity Street			2 August 1972	TM3377189783; 52°27′21″N 1°26′21″E		1275614	Upload Photo	Q26565184
The Vicarage	II	Trinity Street			2 August 1972	TM3375189710; 52°27′19″N 1°26′20″E		1217651	Upload Photo	Q26512354
Walls of Churchyard of Holy Trinity Church	II	Trinity Street			2 August 1972	TM3382489682; 52°27′18″N 1°26′24″E		1217226	Upload Photo	Q26511955
1, 3a and 3, Upper Olland Street	II	1, 3a and 3, Upper Olland Street			9 May 1949	TM3371889573; 52°27′15″N 1°26′18″E		1217656	Upload Photo	Q26512359
2, Upper Olland Street	II	2, Upper Olland Street			2 August 1972	TM3370389584; 52°27′15″N 1°26′17″E		1217790	2, Upper Olland Street More images	Q26512486
4, Upper Olland Street	II	4, Upper Olland Street			2 August 1972	TM3370489576; 52°27′15″N 1°26′17″E		1217662	Upload Photo	Q26512365
6, Upper Olland Street	II	6, Upper Olland Street			2 August 1972	TM3370489569; 52°27′15″N 1°26′17″E		1221243	Upload Photo	Q26515654
8 and 10, Upper Olland Street	II	8 and 10, Upper Olland Street			9 May 1949	TM3370689557; 52°27′14″N 1°26′17″E		1217663	Upload Photo	Q26512366
14 and 16, Upper Olland Street	II	14 and 16, Upper Olland Street			2 August 1972	TM3371089518; 52°27′13″N 1°26′18″E		1221282	Upload Photo	Q26515688
20, Upper Olland Street	II	20, Upper Olland Street			2 August 1972	TM3371389497; 52°27′12″N 1°26′18″E		1275303	Upload Photo	Q26564906
21 and 23, Upper Olland Street	II	21 and 23, Upper Olland Street			2 August 1972	TM3372989482; 52°27′12″N 1°26′18″E		1217658	Upload Photo	Q26512362
22 and 24, Upper Olland Street	II	22 and 24, Upper Olland Street			2 August 1972	TM3371589485; 52°27′12″N 1°26′18″E		1217664	Upload Photo	Q26512367
25 and 25a, Upper Olland Street	II	25 and 25a, Upper Olland Street			2 August 1972	TM3373089472; 52°27′11″N 1°26′19″E		1217659	Upload Photo	Q26512363
27 and 29, Upper Olland Street	II	27 and 29, Upper Olland Street			2 August 1972	TM3373289463; 52°27′11″N 1°26′19″E		1217660	Upload Photo	Q26512364
30, Upper Olland Street	II	30, Upper Olland Street			2 August 1972	TM3372189443; 52°27′10″N 1°26′18″E		1275142	Upload Photo	Q26564751
31-35, Upper Olland Street	II	31-35, Upper Olland Street			2 August 1972	TM3373489453; 52°27′11″N 1°26′19″E		1275301	Upload Photo	Q26564904
White House	II	32, Upper Olland Street			2 August 1972	TM3371489432; 52°27′10″N 1°26′18″E		1275304	Upload Photo	Q26564907
Congregational Manse	II	34, Upper Olland Street			2 August 1972	TM3372189401; 52°27′09″N 1°26′18″E		1217665	Upload Photo	Q26512368
Old Vicarage	II	37, Upper Olland Street			9 May 1949	TM3374889423; 52°27′10″N 1°26′19″E		1275302	Upload Photo	Q26564905
38 Upper Olland Street	II	38, Upper Olland Street			2 August 1972	TM3370489386; 52°27′09″N 1°26′17″E		1275117	Upload Photo	Q26564727
40-44, Upper Olland Street	II	40-44, Upper Olland Street			2 August 1972	TM3372889377; 52°27′08″N 1°26′18″E		1275305	Upload Photo	Q26564908
46, Upper Olland Street	II	46, Upper Olland Street			2 August 1972	TM3372989361; 52°27′08″N 1°26′18″E		1221581	Upload Photo	Q26515960
48 Upper Olland Street	II	48, Upper Olland Street			2 August 1972	TM3373189354; 52°27′08″N 1°26′18″E		1217666	Upload Photo	Q26512369
50 Upper Olland Street	II	50, Upper Olland Street			2 August 1972	TM3373189344; 52°27′07″N 1°26′18″E		1217667	Upload Photo	Q26512370
Rose Hall	II*	52, Upper Olland Street			9 May 1949	TM3372489324; 52°27′07″N 1°26′18″E		1275077	Upload Photo	Q17546922
Congregational Church	II	Upper Olland Street	church building		2 August 1972	TM3369889410; 52°27′09″N 1°26′17″E		1221490	Congregational Church More images	Q26515874
Front Wall of Garden of Number 52	II	Upper Olland Street			2 August 1972	TM3374489313; 52°27′06″N 1°26′19″E		1221640	Upload Photo	Q26516016
11a and 11, Wharton Street	II	11a and 11, Wharton Street			2 August 1972	TM3384089613; 52°27′16″N 1°26′25″E		1221653	11a and 11, Wharton Street More images	Q26516028
5-11, Wingfield Street	II	5-11, Wingfield Street			2 August 1972	TM3393989444; 52°27′10″N 1°26′29″E		1275028	Upload Photo	Q26564647
14, Wingfield Street	II	14, Wingfield Street			2 August 1972	TM3396689435; 52°27′10″N 1°26′31″E		1221764	Upload Photo	Q26516139

== See also ==
- Grade I listed buildings in Suffolk
- Grade II* listed buildings in Suffolk

== Sources ==
- Bettely, James; Pevsner, Nikolaus (2015) [1961], Suffolk: East, The Buildings of England, New Haven and London: Yale University Press, ISBN 978-0-300-19654-2
