= Clays (company) =

British printer

Coordinates: 52.4577306°N 1.4320012°E

Clays Limited
- Type: Subsidiary
- Industry: Printing
- Headquarters: Bungay, United Kingdom
- Products: Books
- Number of employees: 790 (2021)
- Parent: Elcograf S.p.A.
- Website: clays.co.uk

Clays is a British printing company based in Bungay, Suffolk.

== History ==
The origin of the company begins in the nineteenth century, when Richard Clay (1789–1877) first managed and then, in 1827, became the owner of Burton & Briggs, a London printer. Clay retired in 1868, and his sons set up a new partnership—R. Clay, Sons & Taylor—that went on to acquire Childs & Son, a printer in Bungay, in 1876. Previously a general printer, after the First World War, the company specialised more in book printing. The company floated on the London stock exchange in 1956 and joined the St Ives Group in 1985. In 2018, Italian printers Elcograf paid £23.8 million to acquire Clays from the St Ives Group.

== Current operations ==
The company printed some 167 million books in 2024. The Bungay printworks was featured in "Hardback Books", an episode of the BBC television documentary series Inside the Factory in January 2025. In February 2025, Clays announced the acquisition of TJ Books, a printer based in Padstow which had gone into administration the same month. In 2021, the company employed 790 people.

== Notable authors and works ==
Clays has printed:

- The Harry Potter books. Even though these were produced under strict security conditions, in 2003 a Clays employee managed to steal some chapters of Harry Potter and the Order of the Phoenix and offered them to The Sun.
- Michael Wolff's insider view of Donald Trump's first administration, Fire and Fury: Inside the Trump White House.
- Andy Shepherd's The Boy Who Grew Dragons series.
- A scratch and sniff edition of Roald Dahl's The Twits.
- David Jason's autobiography My Life and Helen Fielding's Mad About the Boy, (one of the novels in the Bridget Jones series), pages of which were accidentally mixed up in 2013.
- Works by Tom Clancy, Terry Pratchett, Margaret Thatcher, Tony Blair, Stephen Fry, and Philip Pullman.
- Penguin Clothbound Classics
