= Bungay Holy Trinity =

Former civil parish in Suffolk, England

Coordinates: 52.4552°N 1.4399°E

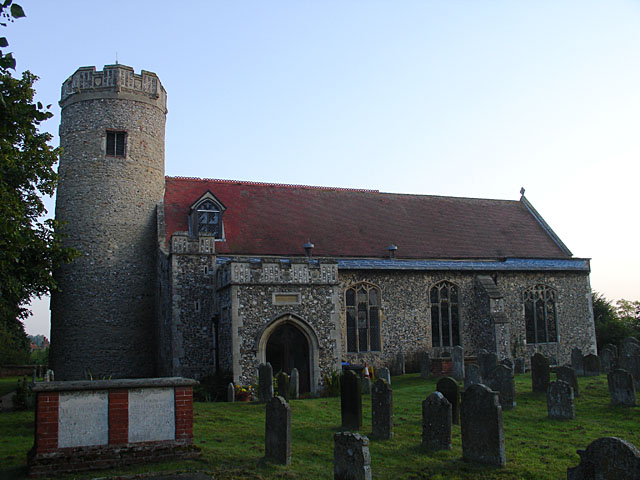
- Church of the Holy Trinity

- Location within Suffolk
- Civil parish: Bungay
- District: East Suffolk
- Shire county: Suffolk
- Region: East
- Country: England
- Sovereign state: United Kingdom
- Police: Suffolk
- Fire: Suffolk
- Ambulance: East of England

Bungay Holy Trinity is a former civil parish, now in the parish of Bungay, in the East Suffolk district, in the county of Suffolk, England. At the 1901 census (the last before the abolition of the parish), Bungay Holy Trinity had a population of 1640. The church, Holy Trinity Church is a Grade I listed building.

== History ==
Bungay Holy Trinity was in the Wangford hundred. On 8 March 1879 land were transferred from and to Bungay St Mary and land was also transferred to Ilketshall St Lawrence. In 1894 Bungay Holy Trinity became part of Wangford Rural District, and in 1889 Wangford Rural District became part of the administrative county of East Suffolk, on 1 April 1910 the parish was abolished and merged with Bungay St Mary to form "Bungay" and became part of Bungay Urban District. In 1974 the area became part of Waveney non-metropolitan district in the non-metropolitan county of Suffolk. In 2019 it became part of East Suffolk district.
