= Flixton Quarry =

Gravel quarry in Suffolk, England

Coordinates: 52.423°N 1.367°E

- Site of Special Scientific Interest
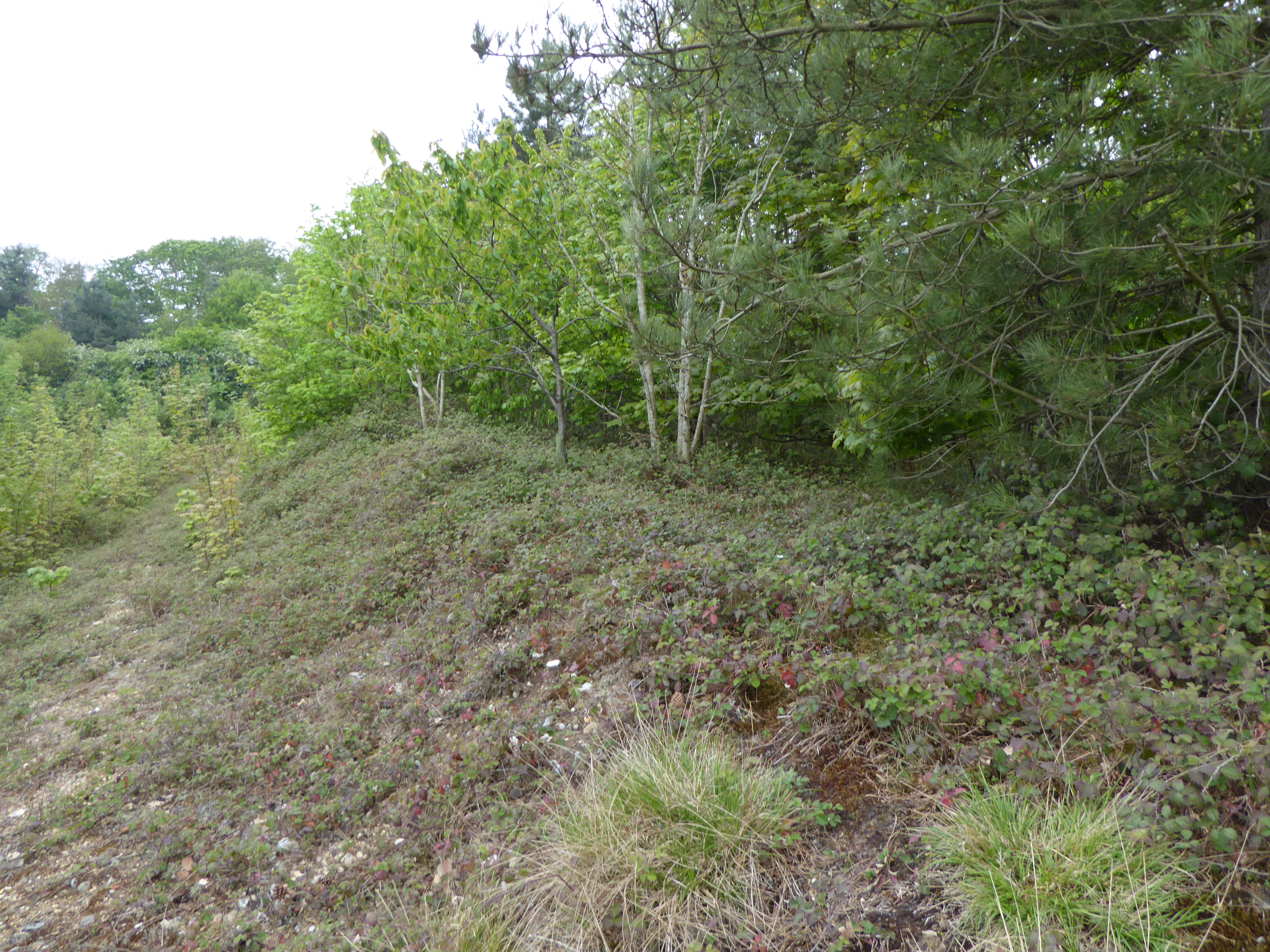
- Location of Flixton Quarry.
- Area of search: Suffolk
- Grid reference: TM 290 859
- Interest: Geological
- Area: 0.7 hectares
- Notification date: 1991
- Location map: Magic Map

Flixton Quarry is a 0.7 hectares (1.7 acres) geological Site of Special Scientific Interest 3.75 miles (6.04 km) south-west of Bungay in the English county of Suffolk. It is a Geological Conservation Review site located in the parish of Homersfield.

This site has sands and gravels which are thought to be a glacial outwash dating to the most extreme ice age of the Pleistocene epoch, the Anglian glaciation around 450,000 years ago. It is described by Natural England as important because of its relationship with deposits of the succeeding Hoxnian Stage.

There is access to the site from the Angles Way footpath.
