= The Rage (play) =

1794 play

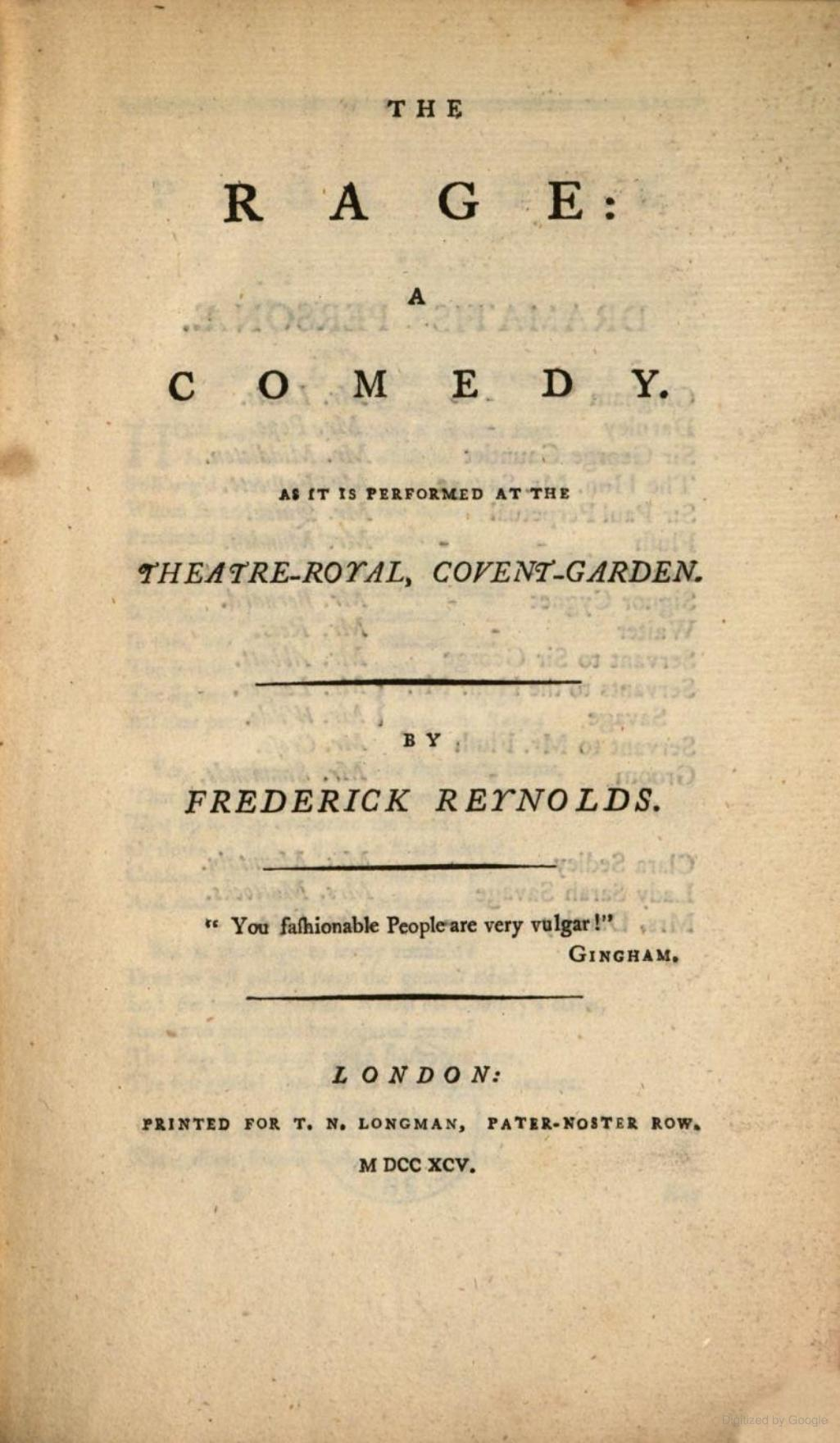
- Original language: English
- Written by: Frederick Reynolds
- Genre: Comedy
- Setting: London, present day

Premiere
- Date: 23 October 1794
- Place: Theatre Royal, Covent Garden, London

The Rage is a 1794 comedy play by the British writer Frederick Reynolds. It premiered at the Theatre Royal, Covent Garden in London on 23 October 1794. The original cast included William Thomas Lewis as Gingham, Alexander Pope as Darnley, James Middleton as Sir George Gauntlet, John Fawcett as Honourable Mr Savage, John Quick as Sir Paul Perpetual, Joseph Shepherd Munden as Flush, George Davenport as Ready, John Bernard as Signor Cygnet, Rosemond Mountain as Clara Sedley, Isabella Mattocks as Lady Sarah Savage and Jane Pope as Mrs Darnley. The Irish premiere took place at the Crow Street Theatre in Dublin on 16 January 1795.

== Bibliography ==
- Greene, John C. Theatre in Dublin, 1745-1820: A Calendar of Performances, Volume 6. Lexington Books, 2011.
- Nicoll, Allardyce. A History of English Drama 1660–1900: Volume IV. Cambridge University Press, 2009.
