= The World in a Village =

1793 play

- Original language: English
- Written by: John O'Keeffe
- Genre: Comedy
- Setting: A village fifteen miles from London

Premiere
- Date: 23 November 1793
- Place: Theatre Royal, Covent Garden, London

The World in a Village is a 1793 comedy play by the Irish writer John O'Keeffe. It was staged at the Theatre Royal, Covent Garden in London on 23 November 1793. The original cast included John Powell as Sir Henry Check, John Henry Johnstone as Captain Mullinahack, James Middleton as William Bellevue, Joseph George Holman as Charles, Thomas Hull as Willows, William Cubitt as Captain Vanslueisen, William Macready as Briers, John Fawcett as Master Jack, William Thomas Lewis as Grigsby, Joseph Shepherd Munden as Jollyboy, Harriet Pye Esten as Louisa, Isabella Mattocks as Mrs Allbut and Susan Fawcett as Mrs. Bellevue. Its Irish premiere took place at the Crow Street Theatre on 25 November 1794.

== Bibliography ==
- Greene, John C. Theatre in Dublin, 1745-1820: A Calendar of Performances, Volume 6. Lexington Books, 2011.
- Nicoll, Allardyce. A History of English Drama 1660–1900: Volume III. Cambridge University Press, 2009.
- Hogan, C.B (ed.) The London Stage, 1660–1800: Volume V. Southern Illinois University Press, 1968.
