= The Deserted Daughter =

Play by Thomas Holcroft

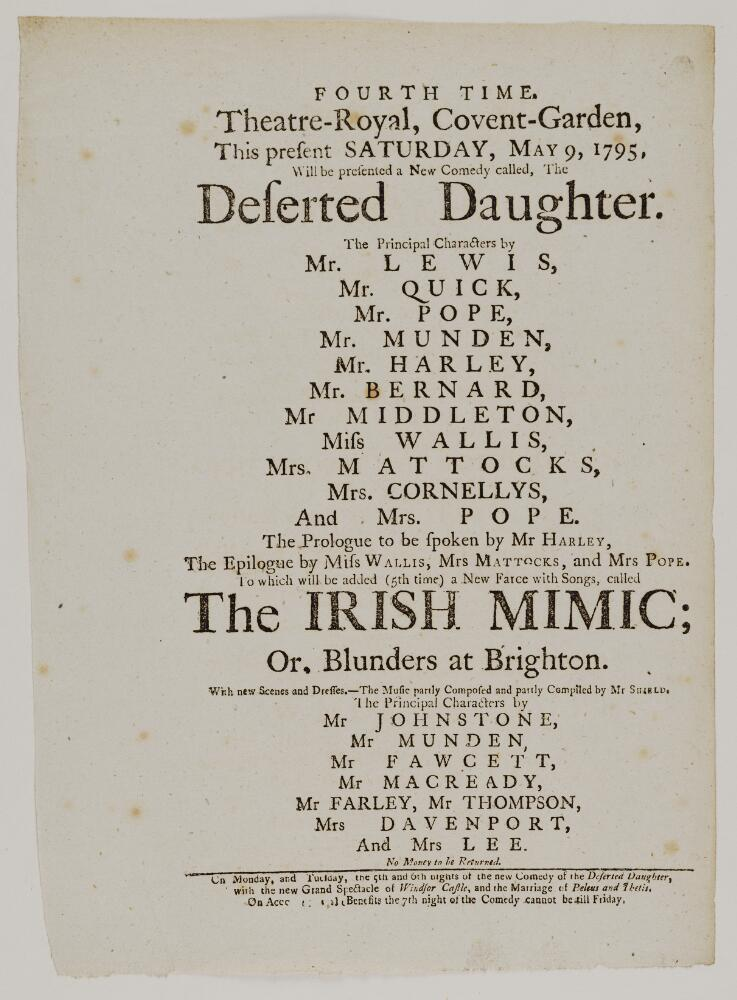
- Original language: English
- Written by: Thomas Holcroft
- Genre: Comedy

Premiere
- Date: 2 May 1795
- Place: Covent Garden Theatre, London

The Deserted Daughter is a 1795 comedy play by the British writer Thomas Holcroft.

The original Covent Garden cast included William Thomas Lewis as Cheveril, John Quick as Item, Alexander Pope as Mr Mordent, Joseph Shepherd Munden as Donald, George Davies Harley as Lennox, John Bernard as Grime, James Middleton as Clement, Isabella Mattocks as Mrs Sarsnet and Jane Pope as Lady Anne.

== Bibliography ==
- Nicoll, Allardyce. A History of English Drama 1660–1900: Volume III. Cambridge University Press, 2009.
- Hogan, C.B (ed.) The London Stage, 1660–1800: Volume V. Southern Illinois University Press, 1968.
