= Bungay Priory =

Priory in Suffolk, England

Coordinates: 52.455°N 1.439°E

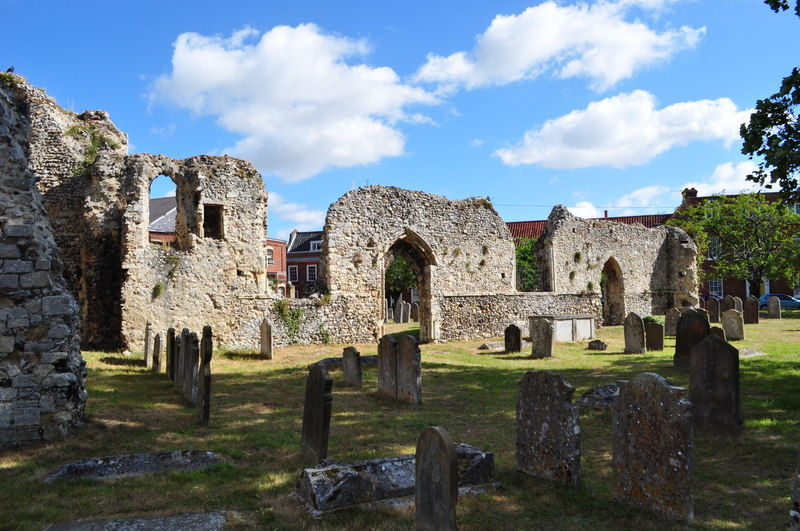
Ruins of Bungay Priory.

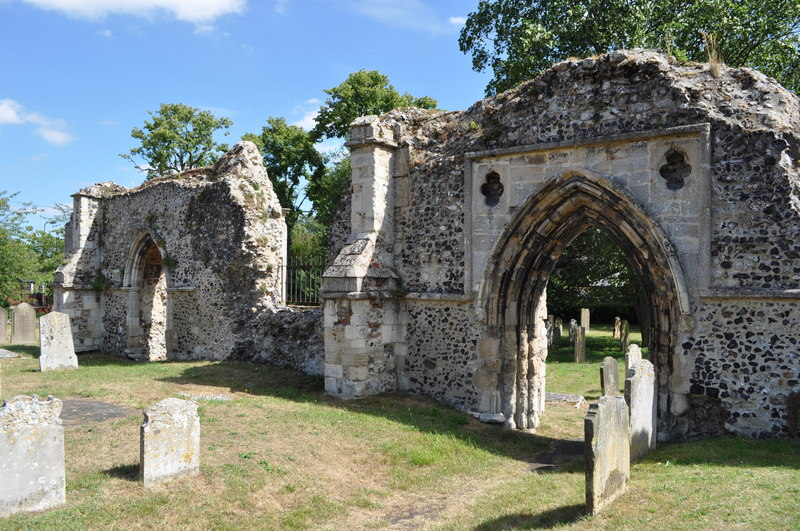
Ruins of Bungay Priory.

Bungay Priory was a Benedictine nunnery in the town of Bungay in the English county of Suffolk. It was founded c. 1160–1185 by the Countess Gundreda, wife or widow of Hugh Bigod, 1st Earl of Norfolk, upon lands of her maritagium and was confirmed to her and her second husband Roger de Glanville by King Henry II. It was dissolved in about 1536. At the time of the suppression it consisted of a prioress and 11 nuns. The priory church, the Church of the Holy Cross, became the Church of St Mary, the parish church in Bungay. Although ruins of the priory remain to the east of the church, any remaining intact buildings are likely to have been destroyed in the Bungay fire of 1688 which severely damaged the church itself. The church and the ruins of the priory are a Grade I listed building.

== Date of foundation ==
The foundation date of c. 1160, proposed in some older authorities, represents an earliest possible date, and is unconfirmed. Gundreda, daughter of Roger de Beaumont, 2nd Earl of Warwick, was the second wife of Hugh Bigod, and not of his father Roger Bigod. Hugh Bigod died in 1176 or 1177 and Gundreda's marriage to Roger de Glanville followed that. The witnesses to Henry II's charter of confirmation to her include John, Bishop of Norwich who was elected in 1175, and this charter, made at Geddington, Northamptonshire, is confidently dated to 1188. The original foundation however could have been based upon lands received in connection with her first marriage settlement and the confirmation prompted by the second marriage.
