= George Closse =

English divine

- Occupation: Divine

George Closse (fl. 1585) was an English divine.

== Biography ==
Closse was educated at Trinity College, Cambridge, where he graduated M.A. in 1579. In 1581 he was accused of obtaining the institution to the vicarage of Cuckfield by fraud, and was ejected by legal process. In 1585 he accused Sir Wolstan Dixie, lord mayor of London, in a sermon preached on 6 March at Paul's Cross, of partiality in the administration of justice. Accordingly he was summoned to appear at Guildhall before the mayor and aldermen, and complaint was subsequently lodged with the high commission court, who, John Whitgift presiding, ordered him to make submission in a sermon to be preached at Paul's Cross on 27 March before three doctors and as many bachelors of divinity, who were to act as his judges. In this sermon he reiterated his charge, and the lord mayor made fresh complaint to the high commission. The certificate of the six clergymen was, however, in his favour, and though the lord mayor applied to the privy council he could get no redress. Closse sent his own account of the affair to Abraham Fleming for insertion in the next edition of Holinshed's Chronicles.
