= The Doldrum =

1796 play

- Original language: English
- Written by: John O'Keeffe
- Genre: Comedy
- Setting: London, present day

Premiere
- Date: 23 April 1796
- Place: Theatre Royal, Covent Garden, London

The Doldrum is a 1796 comedy play by the Irish writer John O'Keeffe. A farce, it premiered as an afterpiece at the Theatre Royal, Covent Garden in London on 23 April 1796. The original cast included Joseph Shepherd Munden as Sir Marmaduke, John Quick as Septimus, James Middleton as Captain Septimus, William Macready as Flam, Thomas Knight as Gyp, Samuel Simmons as Looby, Elizabeth Mansell as Emeline and Isabella Mattocks as Mrs. Auburne. The play's prologue made reference to Vortigern and Rowena, a forged play supposedly by Shakespeare, that had recently been staged at the rival Theatre Royal, Drury Lane. The Irish premiere took place at the Crow Street Theatre in Dublin on 11 July 1796.

== Bibliography ==
- Greene, John C. Theatre in Dublin, 1745-1820: A Calendar of Performances, Volume 6. Lexington Books, 2011.
- Nicoll, Allardyce. A History of English Drama 1660–1900: Volume III. Cambridge University Press, 2009.
- Hogan, C.B (ed.) The London Stage, 1660–1800: Volume V. Southern Illinois University Press, 1968.
