= St Mary's Church, Bungay =

Coordinates: 52.4556°N 1.4379°E

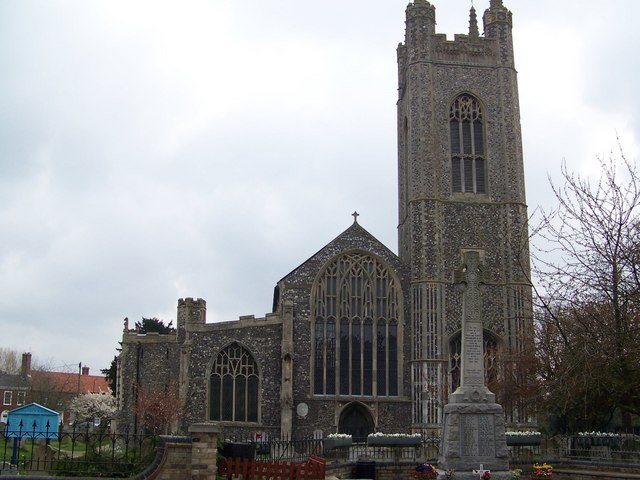
- St Mary's Church, Bungay, from the west

- Location from Suffolk
- OS grid reference: TM 337 898
- Location: Bungay, Suffolk
- Country: England
- Denomination: Anglican
- Website: Churches Conservation Trust

Architecture
- Functional status: Redundant
- Heritage designation: Grade I
- Designated: 9 May 1949
- Architectural type: Church
- Style: Perpendicular Gothic

Specifications
- Materials: Flint and stone

St Mary's Church is a redundant Anglican church in the town of Bungay, Suffolk, England. The church and the ruins of the adjacent priory are recorded in the National Heritage List for England as a designated Grade I listed building, and are under the care of the Churches Conservation Trust. The church stands in the centre of the town on St Mary's Street, the A144 road.

== History ==
St Mary's was built as the church to a Benedictine priory. This was established in the late 12th century, but the main part of the present church dates from the 14th–15th century. The Domesday Survey records a church dedicated to the Holy Cross in the town, and it is thought that St Mary's stands on the site of an earlier Saxon church. The priory was closed in 1536 as a result of the dissolution of the monasteries, St Mary's became a parish church, and a grammar school was established in one of the priory's chapels. In 1577, the church was struck by lightning, and this event led to the "Legend of the Black Dog".

The church was damaged in a great fire in the town in 1688. The roof of the south aisle and some of the fittings, including benches and possibly the pulpit, were burnt, but the roof of the nave was not damaged. The south aisle was re-roofed in 1699, and the church re-opened in 1701. In 1879 the tower was repaired, and the rest of the church was restored, at a cost of £3,000 (equivalent to £320,000 in 2025). During the 20th century the size of the congregation declined and the church was declared redundant. Its benefice has been united with that of Holy Trinity Church. A society, The Friends of St Mary's, cleans the church and organises concerts and other events in the church.

== Architecture ==
=== Exterior ===
The church is constructed in flint and stone in Perpendicular style. Its plan consists of a nave with a clerestory, north and south aisles, and a tower. The tower stands at the west end of the south aisle, and it is surmounted by four tall crocketted pinnacles. There is no chancel. The tower is 110 feet (33.5 m) high. There are ruined remains of the priory in the churchyard to the east of the church.

=== Interior ===
The arcades are supported on five columns consisting of clustered shafts. The west window is particularly large and has complicated tracery in its upper part. The bosses in the roof are carved with a variety of objects, including angels, a lion, two-headed eagles, and a bat. Near the entrance to the church is a dole cupboard, carved with a rat. Bread was placed in the dole cupboard to be given to the poor. Part of the church has been converted into a War Memorial Chapel. This contains a 17th-century Flemish panel depicting the Resurrection that was given to the church by the author H. Rider Haggard. The two-manual organ was made by E. W. Norman, and was moved to the church from Rose Hall, Bungay. It was rebuilt in 1961 by Walker. There is a ring of eight bells, all cast in 1820 by Thomas Mears II of the Whitechapel Bell Foundry.

== Legend of the Black Dog ==
The church was struck by lightning on Sunday 4 August 1577. During the thunderstorm an apparition appeared, consisting of a black Hell Hound which dashed around the church, attacking members of the congregation. It then suddenly disappeared and re-appeared in Holy Trinity Church, Blythburgh 12 miles (19 km) away, injuring members of the congregation there. The dog has been associated with Black Shuck, a dog haunting the coasts of Norfolk, Cambridgeshire, Essex and Suffolk. An image of the Black Dog has been incorporated in the coat of arms of Bungay and has been used in the titles of various enterprises associated with Bungay.

== See also ==
- List of churches preserved by the Churches Conservation Trust in the East of England
- List of English abbeys, priories and friaries serving as parish churches
