= Elizabeth Bonhôte =

English novelist, essayist and poet (1744–1818)

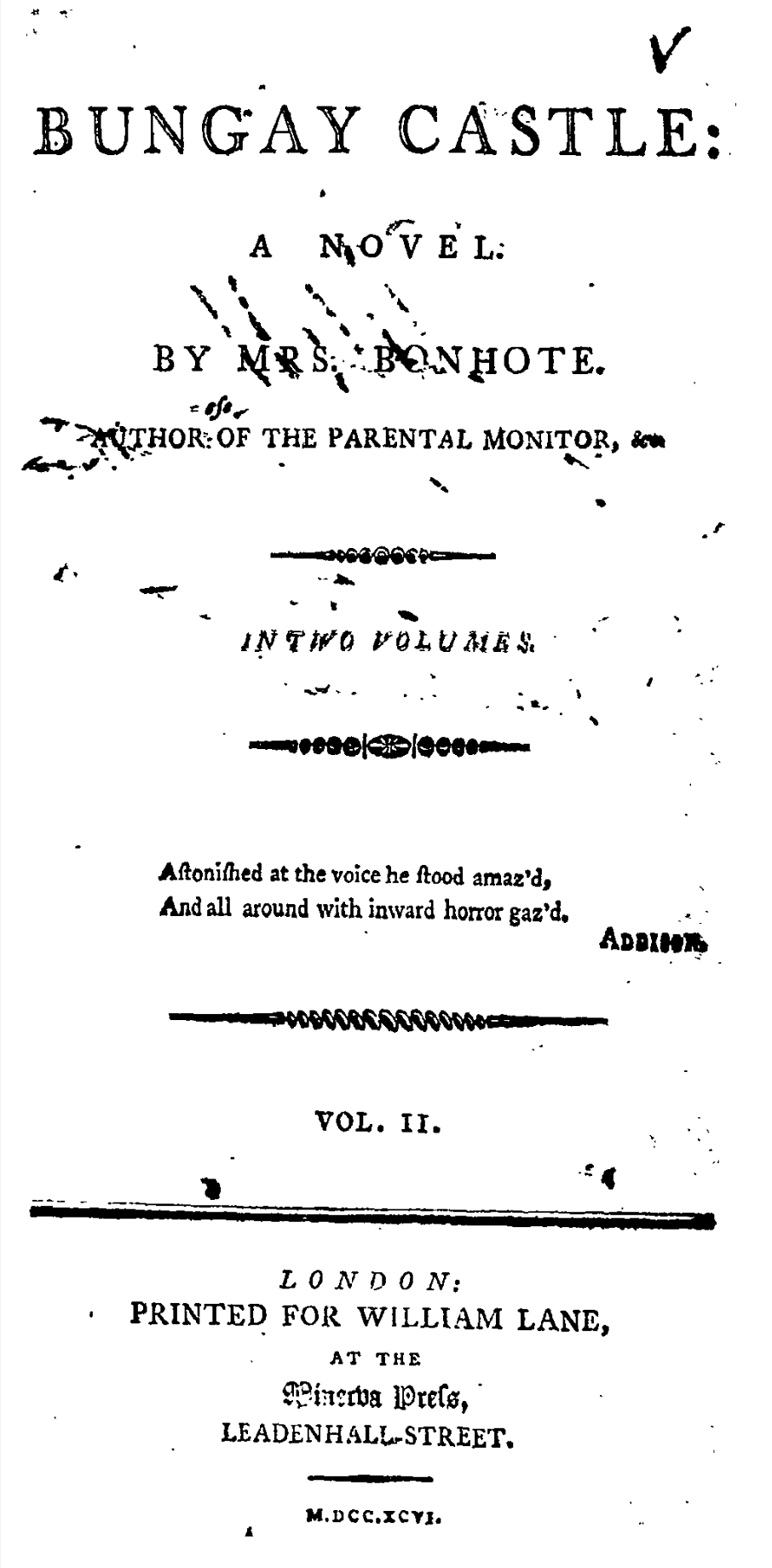
- Title page of volume 2 of Bungay Castle (1797) by Elizabeth Bonhôte
- Born: Elizabeth Mapes baptised 11 April 1744; Bungay, Suffolk, England
- Died: 11 June 1818 (aged 74); Bungay, Suffolk, England
- Occupation: writer
- Spouse: Daniel Bonhôte (m. 1772)
- Writing career
- Notable work: Bungay Castle

Elizabeth Bonhôte, née Mapes (baptised 11 April 1744 – 11 June 1818) was an English novelist, essayist and poet. Her most successful work was Bungay Castle, a Gothic romance written after her husband had bought the ruins of the real Bungay Castle.

== Life ==
Born Elizabeth Mapes in Bungay, Suffolk, in April 1744, Elizabeth was the elder surviving child of James Mapes (baptised 1714–1794), a baker and grocer, and his wife, Elizabeth, née Galliard (died 1789).

She married on 13 October 1772 Daniel Bonhôte, a Bungay solicitor and landowner, by whom she bore three children between 1773 and 1777. One of her daughters, also called Elizabeth, married Rev. Richard Dreyer, rector of Thwaite and a former curate of St Mary's in Bungay. Daniel Bonhôte later became under-sheriff of Suffolk and captain of a militia company. He died in 1804, after they had moved to Bury St Edmunds.

Little else is known of Elizabeth Bonhôte's appearance or personality. After her death at Bungay on 11 June 1818, her will disposed of several dwelling houses and a bakery and shop in the town, as well as £3500 in cash and annuities. She also founded still extant almshouses for elderly women and the widows of poor traders. A cul-de-sac near the centre of Bungay has been named Elizabeth Bonhote Close.

== Work ==
Elizabeth Mapes wrote several elegies and poems in praise of the monarchy, and a first anonymous novel, Hortensia, or, The Distressed Wife in 1769. She is said to have been a royalist "perfectly satisfied with our laws and constitution". In the year of her marriage she had her second novel published, The Rambles of Mr Frankly, Published by his Sister in 1772. This is a moralistic work thought to have been influenced in its form by Laurence Sterne's A Sentimental Journey through France and Italy (1768). Frankly learns from observing people during his walks in Hyde Park. The book became highly popular and was translated into German.

Illness after the birth of her children contributed to a break in her writing career, which was resumed with the novel Olivia, or, The Deserted Bride in 1787. Next came a conduct book containing moral essays "for her children's guidance", called the Parental Monitor. These appeared in two volumes in 1788 by subscription, one applying to girls and one to boys. The verdict of a modern critic: "Intended as a guide to her children in the event of her death, it advocated acceptance of one's lot and dependence on adults." Two further novels, Darnley Vale, or, Emelia Fitzroy (1789) and Ellen Woodley (1790) were both reviewed in the Monthly Review. In 1796 there were two reprints of her Parental Monitor, one in London and one in Dublin.

Bonhôte's most successful novel was inspired by her husband's purchase of the site and ruins of Bungay Castle in 1791. Its grandeur gave rise to Bungay Castle, a Gothic romance which appeared in 1796 with the popular publisher Minerva Press and was dedicated to the Duke of Norfolk. It was reissued as recently as 2006.

Bonhôte wrote occasional verse throughout her life. Her final publication was one such piece: Feeling, or, Sketches from Life: a Desultory Poem (1810).

== Bibliography ==
- Hortensia, or, The Distressed Wife (1769, anonymous)
- The Rambles of Mr Frankly, Published by his Sister (1772)
- Olivia, or, The Deserted Bride (1787)
- The Parental Monitor (1788, 2 vols, by subscription)
- Darnley Vale, or, Emelia Fitzroy (1789)
- Ellen Woodley (1790)
- Bungay Castle (1796).
- Feeling, or, Sketches from Life: a Desultory Poem (1810, anonymously)
