= John Filby Childs =

English printer

John Filby Childs (1783–1853) was an English printer, known as a political radical, a successful lobbyist against the monopoly on printing the Bible, and a congregationalist active against church rates.

== Life ==
He was born at Bungay, Suffolk, and carried on there the family printing business founded in 1795. Charles Brightly had established a printing and stereotype foundry, the business became Brightly & Childs in 1808 and later Messrs. Childs and Son. With Joseph Ogle Robinson, he projected the series of "Imperial octavo editions of standard authors", which sold well for many years; it passed successively through the hands of Westley and Davis, Ball, Arnold & Co., and H. G. Bohn.

The select committee of the House of Commons appointed in 1831 to inquire into the monopoly king's printers' patent arose from a meeting between John Childs, his brother and partner Robert, and Joseph Hume M.P., on the subject of cheap bibles. Childs told the committee that he and his brother had been in business for a quarter of a century, that they employed over a hundred hands, and that they had printed editions of the Bible with notes (thus eluding the patent) for many years.

Childs, a staunch nonconformist, suffered imprisonment on account of a conscientious refusal to pay church rates. This occurred in May 1836, and led to the agitation presaging the Braintree case. His incarceration was the subject of a debate in the House of Commons, and a reference by Sir Robert Peel to "the Bungay martyr." In 1841 the two Childs brothers, Alderman Besley, and others, established The Nonconformist newspaper, for many years edited by Edward Miall. Miall's early work was supported by a group including Childs and Robert Halley, George Hadfield and Adam Thomson of Coldstream.

He married the daughter of a Mr. Brightley. Their son Charles Childs (1807–1876) became the head of the firm of John Childs & Son.

Childs died at Bungay on 12 August 1853, in his seventieth year.
