= Bungay Castle =

Castle in Suffolk

- Suffolk, England
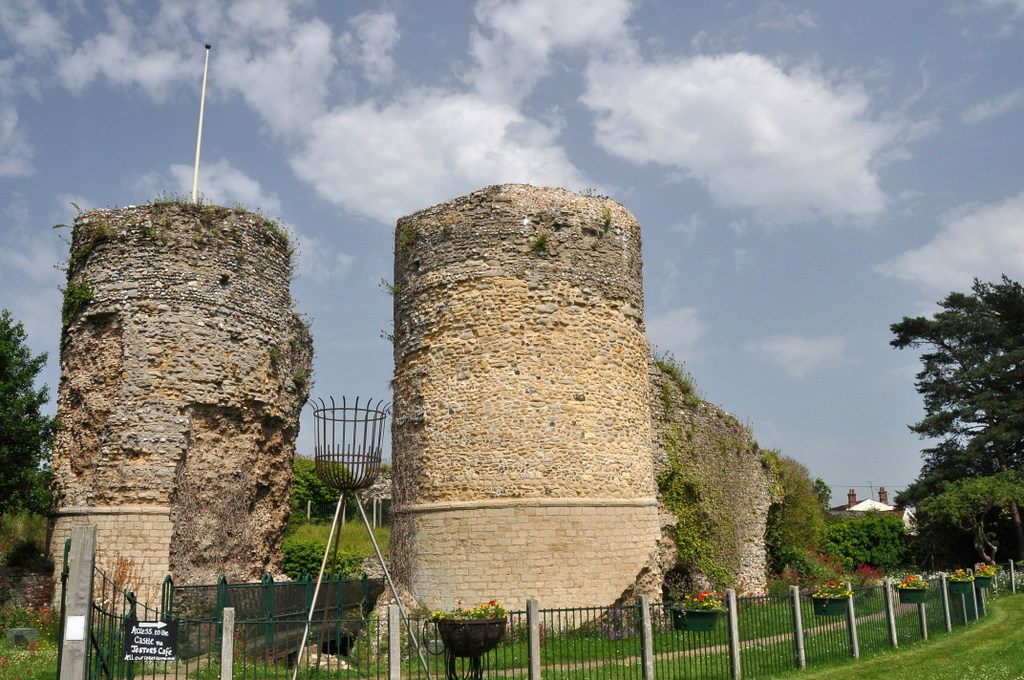
- The remains of Bungay Castle in 2012

Site information
- Type: Edwardian castle
- Owner: Bungay Castle Trust
- Open to the public: NO

Location
- Shown within Suffolk
- Coordinates: 52.4560°N 1.4361°E

Bungay Castle is a Grade I listed building in the town of Bungay, Suffolk.

== History ==
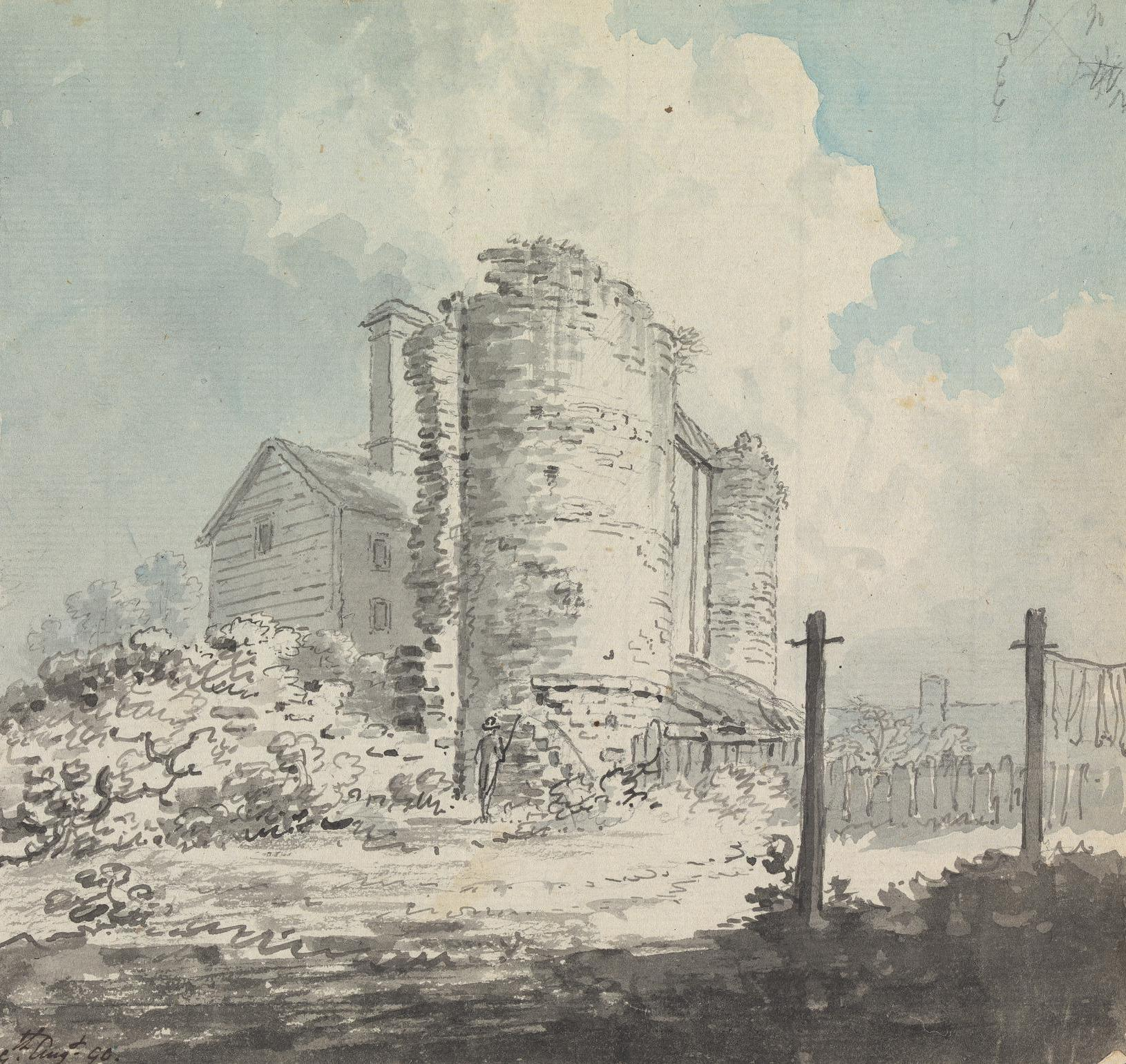
Bungay Castle in 1790, in a watercolour painting by James Moore.

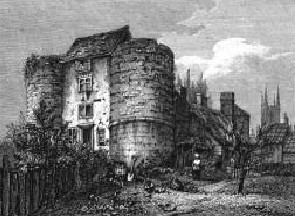
The gate towers in 1819.

The site was originally a Norman castle built by Roger Bigod in about 1100 to take advantage of the natural protection provided by a curve in the River Waveney. Roger's son Hugh was a prominent player in the civil war period known as the Anarchy (1138–1154), and his loyalty was called into question during the early years of the reign of Henry II. Henry confiscated Bungay but in 1164 he returned it to Bigod, who built a large square Norman keep on the site in 1165. It is not recorded how much it cost to build the keep, but the archaeologist Hugh Braun, who led the excavations at the castle in the 1930s, estimated that it would have cost around £1,400 (equivalent to £4,402,254 in 2025). Bigod was on the losing side in the revolt of 1173–1174, and Bungay was besieged, mined and ultimately slighted by royal forces. According to the historian Sidney Painter, it was one of at least 21 castles demolished on Henry II's instructions.

The site was subsequently restored yet again to the Bigod family and was further developed in 1294 by Roger Bigod, 5th Earl of Norfolk, who probably built the massive gate towers on the site. He fell out with Edward I and after his death the castle reverted to the Crown, falling into disrepair and ruin. In 1310, King Edward II granted sustenance to his two younger half-brothers, Thomas of Brotherton and Edmund of Kent, from Bigod's lands which included Bungay. In 1312, Thomas of Brotherton came into the vacated earldom of Norfolk and Bungay Castle which then passed to his daughter Alice Montagu at his death in 1338. Alice had married Edward Montagu, younger brother of William, 1st Earl of Salisbury and it was at Bungay Castle he and two of his retainers beat her so violently, Alice died in January 1352. It stayed in the hands of Edward Montagu until his death in 1361. In1483 it was re-acquired by the Dukes of Norfolk, who retained ownership until the 20th century, except for a short period in the late 18th century. In 1766 the site was sold to Robert Mickleborough, who quarried the keep and curtain walls for road-building materials. Later, in the early 1790s, it was purchased by Daniel Bonhôte, a local solicitor, but was sold back to the Dukes of Norfolk in about 1800.

Other than the removal in 1841 of dwellings that had been built on the site, little or no repairs were undertaken for several centuries.

== Restoration and preservation ==
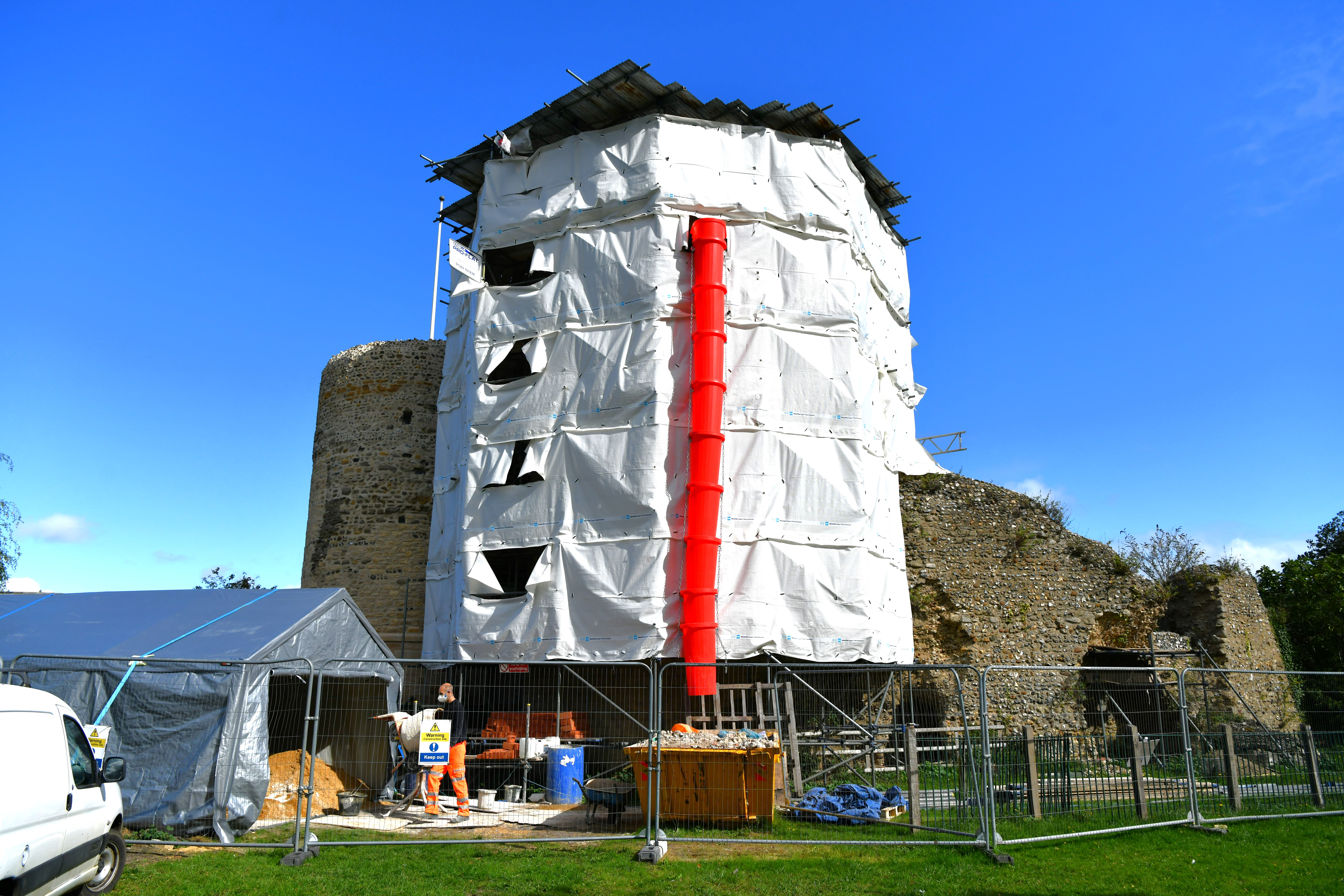
Bungay castle under restoration in 2025

The castle's curtain walls and the twin towers of the gatehouse remain today, as well as a fragment of the keep. Restoration work under the supervision of Hugh Braun began in 1934, following excavations by the amateur archaeologist Leonard Cane. In 1987 the castle was given to the town of Bungay by the 17th Duke of Norfolk and is now owned by the Bungay Castle Trust. It was scheduled in 1915, one of the first sites to be protected under the Ancient Monuments Consolidation and Amendment Act 1913, and was subsequently listed as a Grade I monument in 1949.

The castle is currently closed (Summer 2026) until further notice and is covered in scaffolding as repairs are made. It does not have a reopening time.

== The castle in fiction ==
Bungay Castle was the setting for the eponymous novel by Elizabeth Bonhôte, Bungay Castle, a Gothic romance published in 1796, a few years after her husband Daniel had acquired the site.
