= Bungay Castle (novel) =

1797 novel by Elizabeth Bonhôte

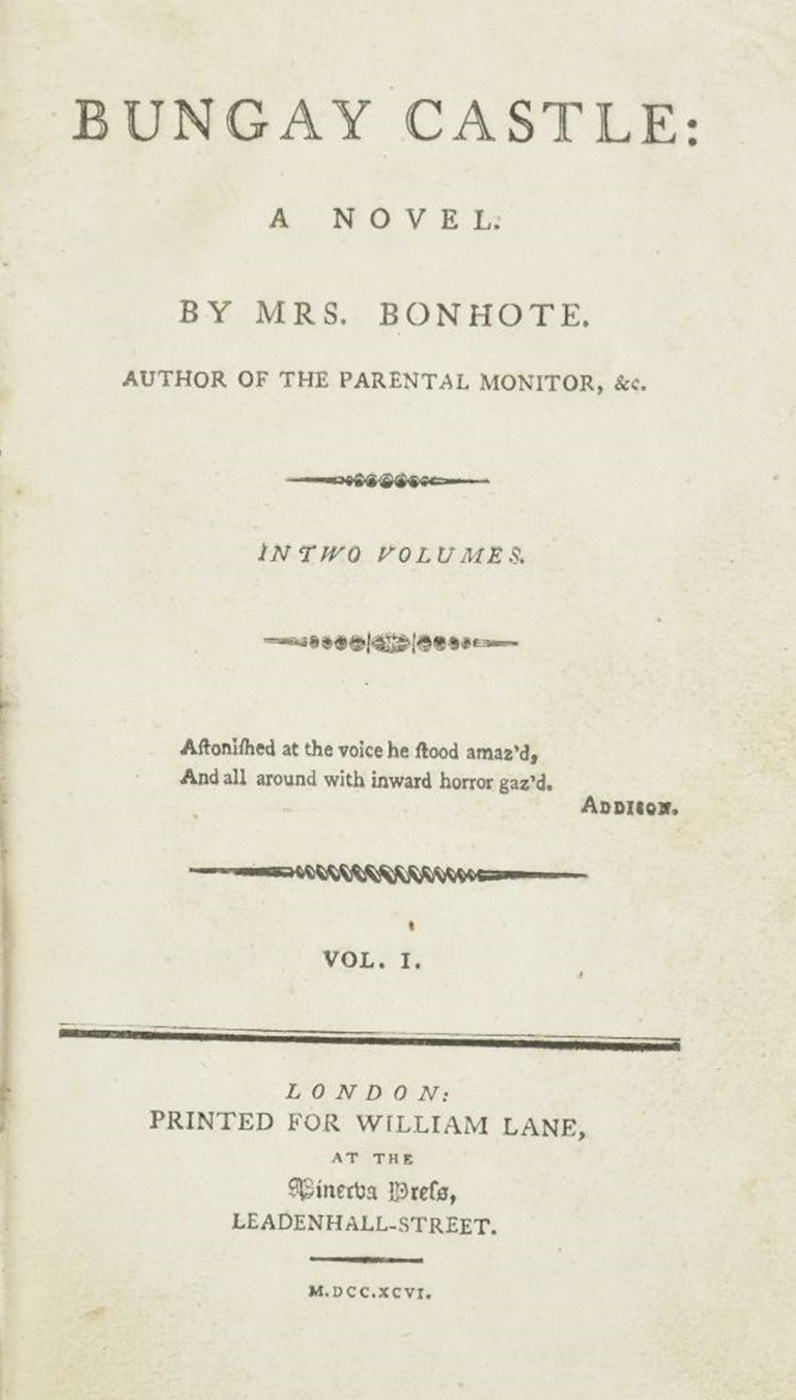
- Title page of first edition
- Author: Elizabeth Bonhôte
- Genre: Gothic novel
- Publisher: William Lane
- Publication date: 1797

Bungay Castle is a gothic novel by Elizabeth Bonhôte, first published in 1797. It is set loosely in the thirteenth century around the First Barons' War, and follows the fortunes of the fictional De Morney family at the real Bungay Castle in Suffolk. Bonhôte's husband purchased the ruins of this castle in 1791. The novel was published by William Lane's Minerva Press, which specialised in commercial fiction for and by women. It sold well to the Minerva Press's audience but soon fell out of print, until a 2006 re-issue. Stylistically, the novel employs classic Gothic tropes but undermines the apparently-supernatural elements to create a novel that is less scary than most Gothics. The core themes of the novel are conservative and pro-monarchic, though it is now often praised for focusing on an active, brave heroine rather than a damsel in distress.

== Summary ==
Roseline and Edwin De Morney live with their father, Sir Philip De Morney, at Bungay Castle, which is near the convent of Saint Mary's. While a student at the convent, Roseline befriends a young novice there, Madeline, and brings her home to Bungay Castle. Madeline and Edwin fall in love. Roseline, Edwin, and Madeline explore the castle, which they suspect to be haunted, and find a gentleman, Walter, locked in a hidden apartment. Walter and Roseline fall in love. However, Sir Philip has arranged for Roseline to marry Baron Fitzosborne, a wealthy older widower. The Baron is eager to marry in part so he can leave Bungay Castle, where he believes he is haunted by his late wife. Roseline dislikes the Baron but agrees to obey her father. However, the wedding is interrupted by Walter, who follows a secret tunnel between the castle and Saint Mary's to appear with a sword. Baron Fitzosborne realises that Walter is in fact his son, believed dead due to a scheme by his late wife and her brother. The Baron agrees that Roseline can marry his son instead of him. First, however, he introduces Walter to society in London. Walter accidentally becomes entangled with the daughter of a brothel-keeper, who attempts to trick him into marriage. He flees London for Bungay Castle to reunite with Roseline, and at last Walter and Roseline marry. Meanwhile, Madeline and Edwin have eloped. They disappeared shortly after Roseline's attempted wedding with the Baron, escaping the convent through the same tunnel used by Walter. They are rescued from poverty by Walter, and both Edwin and Madeline eventually reconcile with their fathers. Sir Philip's other two children, Bertha and Edeliza, make their own suitable marriages, as does the Baron, and the novel ends with optimism for everyone's futures.

== Publication ==
Elizabeth Bonhôte wrote novels, poetry, and moral essays. She was published by the Minerva Press beginning with her 1787 novel Olivia; Or, Deserted Bride. The Minerva Press, run by William Lane, was a prolific publisher of commercial fiction for circulating libraries, particularly associated with both women writers and women readers. Bonhôte's works were financially successful for William Lane, who published four of her works in four years: Olivia (1787), The Parental Monitor (1788), Darnley Vale, or, Emelia Fitzroy (1789) and Ellen Woodley (1790). Bungay Castle, published by the Minerva Press in 1797, was her next work and her last novel.

The book's imminent publication was advertised in December 1796, and its appearance was promoted in May 1797. The date of 1796 on the title page is therefore considered inaccurate, with the 1797 date on the book's dedication more accurate. The Minerva Press also reissued her successful 1772 novel, The Rambles of Mr. Frankly, in 1797.

== Connection to the real Bungay Castle ==
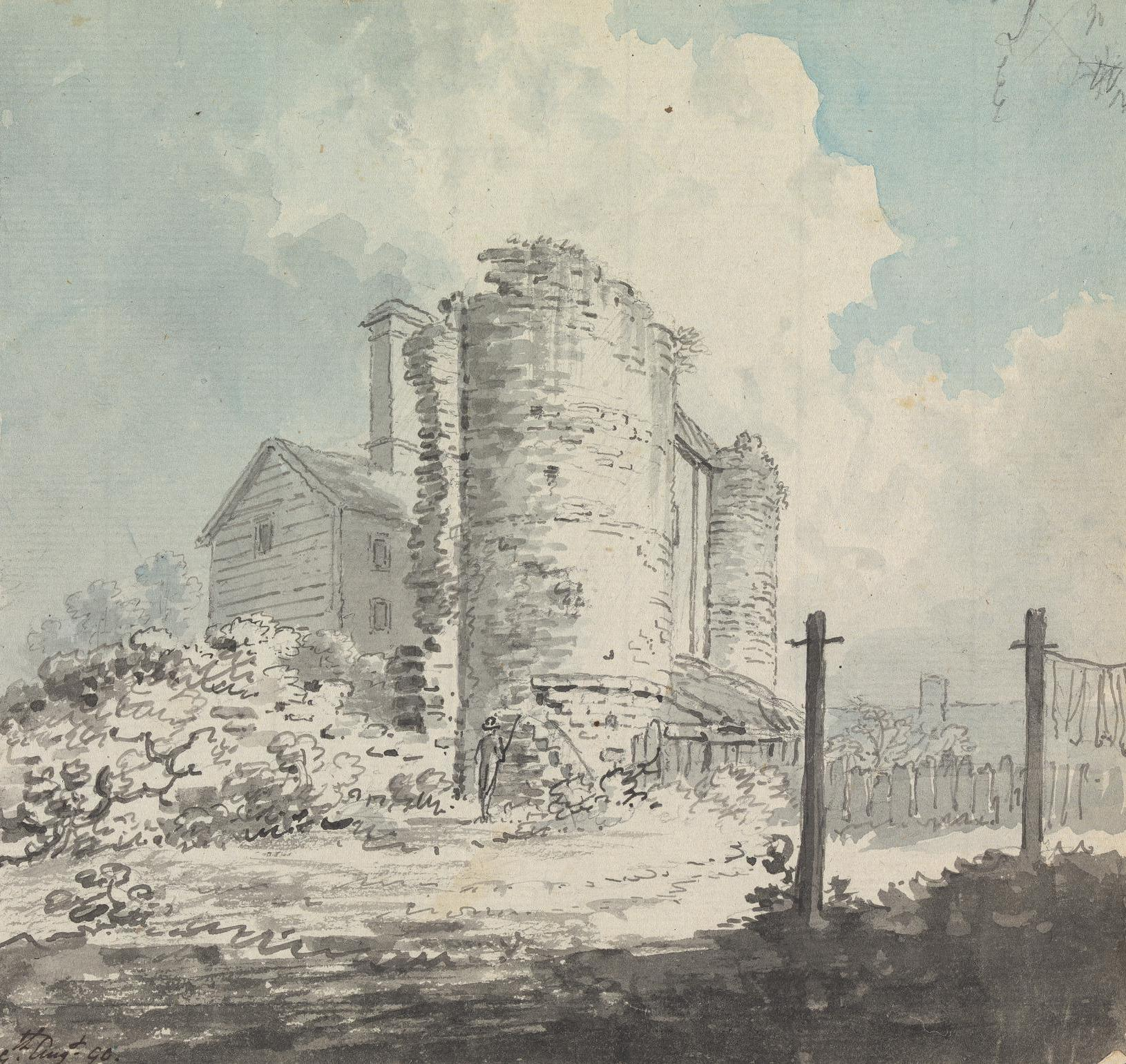
Bungay Castle in 1790, the year before it was purchased by Elizabeth Bonhôte's husband

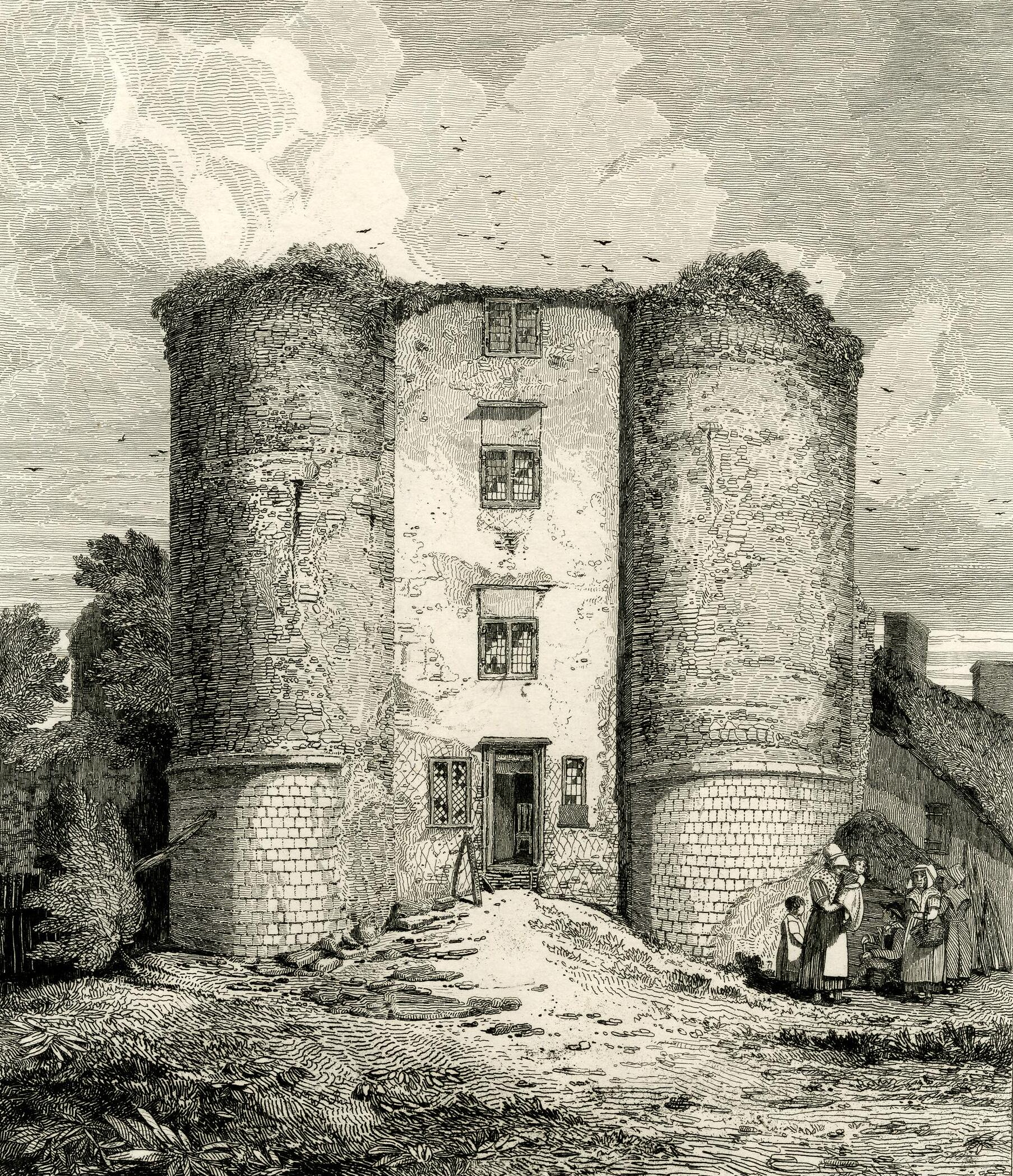
Bungay Castle in 1817, etching by Henry Davy

The real Bungay Castle was built and developed in the twelfth and thirteenth centuries before falling into disrepair after the death of Roger Bigod, 5th Earl of Norfolk (c. 1245 – bf. 6 December 1306). From the 1400s to the 1700s, the castle continued to fall into ruins, and impoverished families built houses along its walls. Bonhôte, who was born in Bungay, grew up only twenty yards from the castle walls and was long fascinated by it. She often explored its ruins as a child. In 1766, the castle walls were purchased by a local man named Robert Mickleborough in order to demolish them and sell the stones as road building materials, though the stones proved too large for easy demolition. In 1791, Bonhôte's husband bought the castle. The purchase was impractical and romantic, since the main castle building was uninhabitable and the only comfortable house on the site was already occupied by Mickleborough's relatives. Bonhôte built a summer house near the castle, where she visited to enjoy the environs and first conceived of the novel Bungay Castle. In 1800, the castle was sold back to Charles Howard, 11th Duke of Norfolk, to whom the novel Bungay Castle is dedicated.

== Style ==
Bungay Castle is unusual among Gothic novels for blending Gothic tropes with traits from domestic fiction. Gothic novels were distinctive in the eighteenth century for emphasising supernatural plot elements, which created an environment of intense fear and undermined a rational social order. Bungay Castle includes many classic Gothic tropes: thunderstorms, dungeons, secret passages, ghostly sounds, hidden lovers, and, of course, the central castle. However, the overall effect of the novel is light, and seemingly-supernatural events are quickly revealed to be innocent and even ridiculous. For example, the characters encounter an ominous floating helmet, which evokes the threatening ghostly armour in the famous Gothic novel The Castle of Otranto (1764) — but it is quickly revealed to be a little girl wearing a costume to spook her siblings. Similar scares are revealed to be caused by a puppy, and by a never-before-mentioned pet squirrel. Many of the ghostly sounds in the castle are ventriloquism from Walter's servant Albert.

== Major themes ==
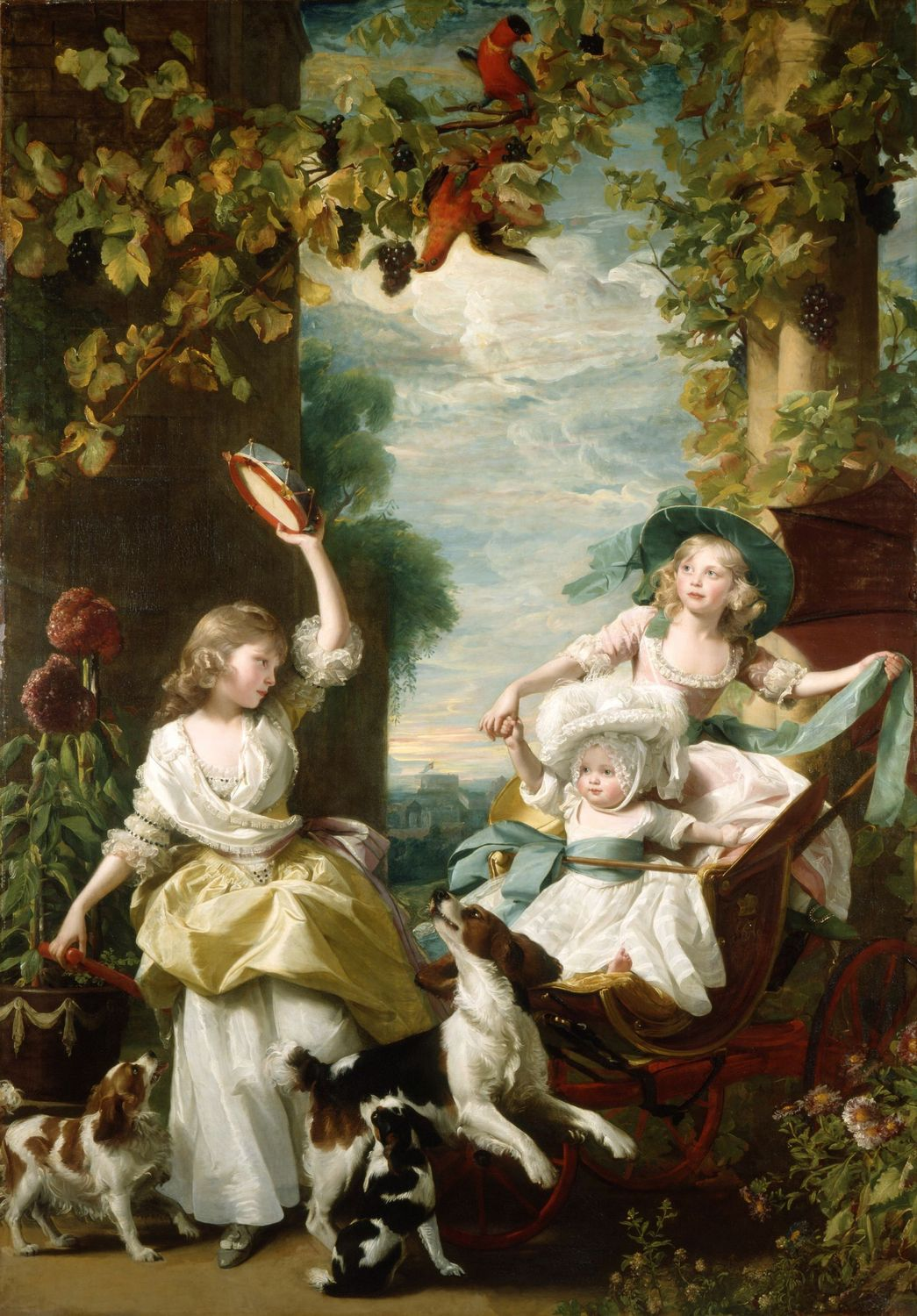
The Three Youngest Daughters of George III by J. S. Copley (1785), a painting very similar to the portrait of the De Mornay daughters in Bungay Castle, reinforcing metaphorical links between the family and the government of Britain

Bungay Castle is considered a politically conservative novel, as reflected in several aspects of its plot and setting. One implicitly conservative element is the novel's presentation of the domestic family life of the De Mornays. The novel frequently compares parental governance to political governance; by praising the good household management of a father who is the ruler of his family, Bonhôte expresses approval for the general idea of good governance by a virtuous king. One parallel between the De Morney family and the monarchy is a painting described in the novel, of the three daughters playing with a dog, which resembles a well-known painting of George III's daughters. The novel frames the De Mornays's domestic life as a microcosm of the First Barons' War, describing the castle as a utopia which is threatened by civil discord.

Bonhôte's conservative and pro-monarchical views are also reflected in her use of Bungay Castle as her setting. When Bonhôte began her novel, castles were a common setting, verging on the stereotypical. The preface to Bungay Castle describes her dissatisfaction with novels that are overly fanciful and set in foreign or imaginary castles. Bonhôte was deeply familiar with Bungay Castle in Suffolk, and used this local setting to introduce more realism to her novel. She also chose her historical time period to recapture the castle's days of greatest glory. During her lifetime, the ruins of the castle had been partly converted into cottages for the rural poor, which she saw as a sad waste of a building which had once been highly desired by barons and kings. Her emphasis on the restoration of Bungay Castle to its medieval glories therefore reflects a general emphasis on conservative and pro-monarchist politics as a return to lost traditions.

One aspect of the novel which reads as less conservative today is its heroine, who rescues her male love interest rather than being a passive damsel in distress. Roseline displays bravery and independence in leading most of the exploration of the castle. She is seen as a refreshingly active heroine who appeals to modern audiences.

Like many eighteenth-century Gothic novels, Bungay Castle depicts convents as predatory institutions which imprison women against their will. This depiction of convents is in keeping with the novel's overall anti-Catholic sentiments.

== Reception ==
Bungay Castle was Bonhôte's first Gothic novel, and it became her most financially successful. In October 1797, a review in The Critical Review was lukewarm. The reviewer praised Bonhôte's prose and described the hero, Walter, as "a being somewhat different from his predecessors in the dungeons", but found the plot too repetitive and the dialogue "very tame and insipid". Nonetheless, the novel sold well, and Bonhôte became one of the best-selling authors with the Minerva Press. The novel did not see a second edition, and remained out of print until a 2006 re-issue by Zittaw Press, edited by Curt Herr. A reviewer for this re-issue found the story exciting, suspenseful, and "[t]rue to Gothic form".

== Editions ==
- Curt Herr (editor). Bungay Castle: A Novel, Zittaw Press, 2006. ISBN 978-0-97672-125-3
