= Bungay =

Town in Suffolk, England

Coordinates: 52.456°N 1.437°E

- Town and civil parish
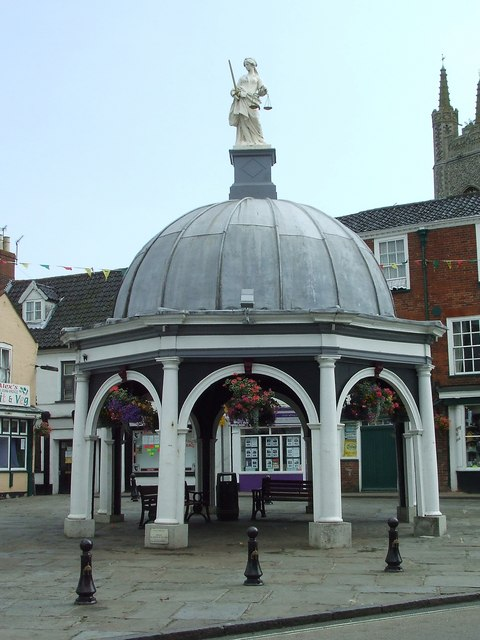
- Bungay Buttercross

- Location within Suffolk
- Area: 11 km^{2} (4.2 sq mi)
- Population: 5,127 (2011)
  - Density: 466/km^{2} (1,210/sq mi)
- OS grid reference: TM336898
- Civil parish: Bungay
- District: East Suffolk
- Shire county: Suffolk
- Region: East
- Country: England
- Sovereign state: United Kingdom
- Post town: Bungay
- Postcode district: NR35
- Dialling code: 01986
- UK Parliament: Waveney Valley

Bungay (/ˈbʌŋɡi/) is a market town, civil parish and electoral ward in the East Suffolk district of Suffolk, England. It lies in the Waveney Valley, 5 1/2 miles (9 kilometres) west of Beccles on the edge of The Broads, and at the neck of a meander of the River Waveney. In 2011 it had a population of 5,127.

== History ==
The origin of the name of Bungay is thought to derive from the Anglo-Saxon title Bunincga-haye, signifying the land belonging to the tribe of Bonna, a Saxon chieftain. Due to its high position, protected by the River Waveney and marshes, the site was in a good defensive position and attracted settlers from early times. Roman artefacts have been found in the region.

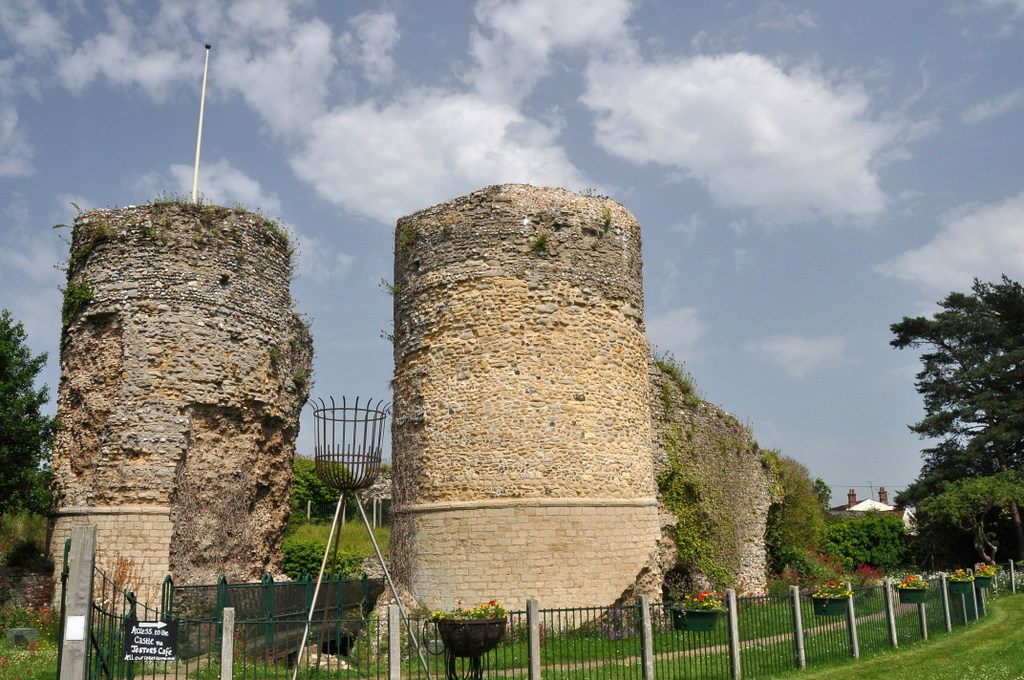
The remains of Bungay Castle

Bungay Castle, which is shown on Bungay's town sign, was originally built by the Normans but was later rebuilt by Roger Bigod, 5th Earl of Norfolk and his family, who also owned Framlingham Castle. The castle contains a unique surviving example of mining galleries, dating to the siege of the castle in 1174. They were intended to undermine and thus collapse the castle's tower and keep.

The Church of St. Mary was once the church of the Benedictine Bungay Priory, founded by Gundred, wife of Roger de Glanville. The 13th-century Franciscan friar Thomas Bungay later enjoyed a popular reputation as a magician, appearing as Roger Bacon's sidekick in Robert Greene's Elizabethan comedy Friar Bacon and Friar Bungay.

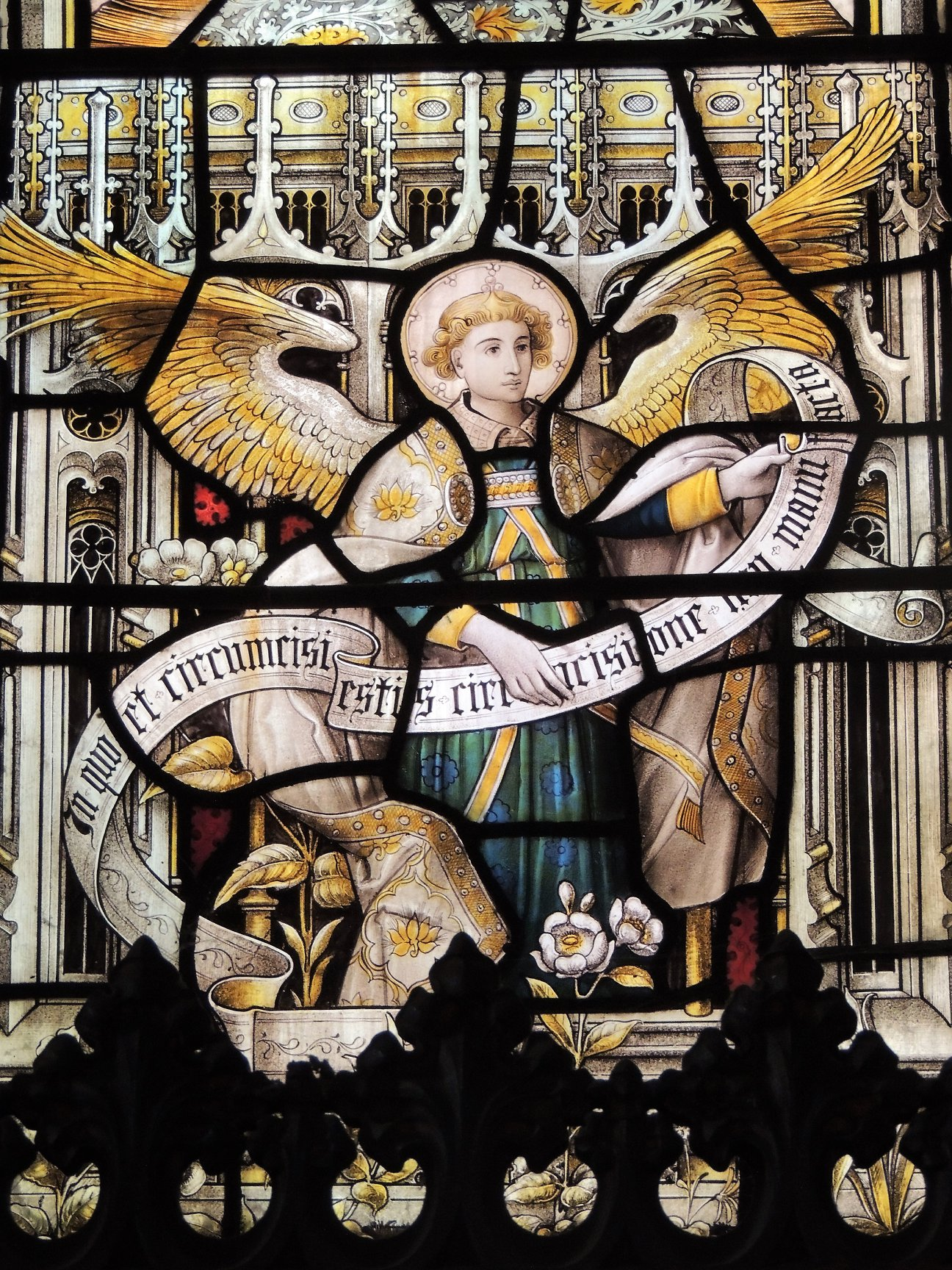
A window from St Edmund's Roman Catholic Church

The 11th-century church of Holy Trinity, with its round tower, lies southeast of St. Mary's churchyard, while the 19th-century red brick Roman Catholic church of St. Edmund is immediately south of St Mary's churchyard.

The town was almost destroyed by a great fire in 1688. The central Buttercross was constructed in 1689 and was the place where local farmers displayed their butter and other farm produce for sale. Until 1810, there was also a Corn Cross, but this was taken down and replaced by a pump.

Bungay was important for the printing and paper manufacture industries. Joseph Hooper, a wealthy Harvard University graduate who fled Massachusetts when his lands were seized after the American Revolution, rented a mill at Bungay in 1783 and converted it for paper manufacture. Charles Brightly established a printing and stereotype foundry in 1795. Then in partnership with John Filby Childs, the business became Brightly & Childs in 1808 and later Messrs. Childs and Son. Charles Childs (1807–1876) succeeded his father as the head of the firm of John Childs & Son. The business was further expanded after 1876 as R. Clay and Sons.

The railway arrived with the Harleston to Bungay section of the Waveney Valley Line opening in November 1860 and the Bungay to Beccles section in March 1863. Bungay had its own railway station near Clay's Printers. The station closed to passengers in 1953 and freight in 1964.

In 1910 Bungay became an urban district in the administrative county of East Suffolk, the district contained the parish of Bungay. On 1 April 1974 the district and parish were abolished and became part of Waveney district in the non-metropolitan county of Suffolk. A successor parish was formed covering the same area as the former district and its parish. In 2019 it became part of East Suffolk district.

== Modern Bungay ==
Local firms include St. Peter's Brewery, based at St. Peter's Hall to the south of the town, and the printer Clays, on Popson Street to the northwest.

In 2008, Bungay became Suffolk's first Transition Town and part of a global network of communities that have started projects in the areas of food, transport, energy, education, housing and waste as small-scale local responses to the global challenges of climate change, economic hardship and limited cheap energy.

=== Reeve ===
Bungay is the only town in the United Kingdom still to have a town reeve, though there are surviving portreeves in Laugharne and Ashburton. The reeve runs the town trust, from which each reeve selects the following reeve.

=== Culture ===
Bungay is well-known for celebrating folklore, with the annual Bungay Folk Festival launching in 2024 as a celebration of local folk tales and mythology, including the black shuck. The festival includes various music, dance and artistic performances. The town also has a vibrant theatre, The Fisher Theatre, which is of Georgian construction and dates back to 1828.

Notably, the town also gained media prominence in 2023 as Britain's 'Satanist Capital' owing to the fact that one in 120 residents identified as a satanist in the 2021 census, a figure much higher than the national average.

== Black Shuck ==
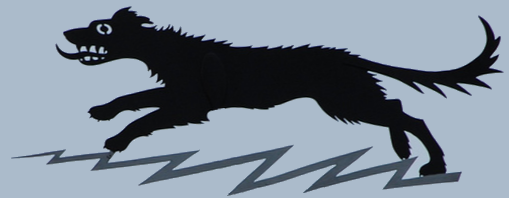
Black Shuck near Bungay's Buttercross

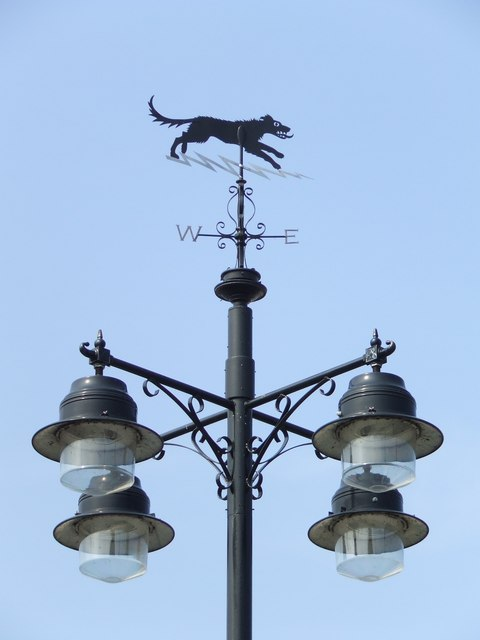
Black Shuck

St Mary's Church was struck by lightning on Sunday 4 August 1577. According to legend, an apparition appeared during the thunderstorm, consisting of a black Hell Hound which dashed around the church, attacking members of the congregation. It then suddenly disappeared and re-appeared in Holy Trinity Church, Blythburgh 12 miles (19 km) away, injuring members of the congregation there. The dog has been associated with Black Shuck, a mythical dog haunting the coasts of Norfolk, Suffolk, and Essex.

An image of the Black Dog has been incorporated in the coat of arms of Bungay and has been used in the titles of various enterprises associated with Bungay as well as several of the town's sporting events. An annual race, The Black Dog Marathon, begins in Bungay and follows the course of the River Waveney, and the town's football club is nicknamed the "Black Dogs". Black Shuck was also the subject of a song by The Darkness.

== Sport ==
The local football club, Bungay Town, play in the Anglian Combination, having previously been members of the Eastern Counties League. The team plays its home games at the Maltings Meadow Sports Ground.

Godric Cycling Club is based in Bungay. It organises a number of events each year, including weekly club runs.

== Notable residents ==
Bungay was home to several literary figures. Thomas Miller (1731–1804), the bookseller and antiquarian, settled in the village. His publisher son, William Miller (1769–1844), was born there. The author Elizabeth Bonhôte, née Mapes, (1744–1818) was born and grew up there, marrying Daniel Bonhôte and writing the notable book Bungay Castle, a gothic romance. Bonhôte even once owned Bungay Castle. The Strickland family which, according to the Canadian Dictionary of Biography, was as prolific as the Brontës, Edgeworths and Trollopes, settled in the village 1802–08. Their daughters included Agnes Strickland, a historian.

The noted French writer, politician, diplomat and historian, François-René, vicomte de Chateaubriand while exiled from France, 1792 – 1800, during the Revolution spent a period living at the Music House, No. 34 Bridge Street. This is recorded on a blue plaque.

Others were Catharine Parr Traill, who concentrated on children's literature, and Susanna Moodie, who emigrated to Canada and wrote Roughing it in the Bush (1852) as a warning to others. The novelist Sir H. Rider Haggard (1856–1925) was born nearby in Bradenham and presented St. Mary's Church with a wooden panel, displayed behind the altar. Religious writer Margaret Barber (1869–1901), author of the posthumously published best-selling book of meditations, The Roadmender, settled in Bungay. In 1954, the electrical industry pioneer Caroline Haslett retired to the town to live with her sister Rosalind Messenger.

More recently, Formula 1 motor racing president Bernie Ecclestone was brought up in Bungay and internet activist Julian Assange was confined to nearby Ellingham Hall, Norfolk in 2010–11. Authors Elizabeth Jane Howard and Louis de Bernières have lived in the town. Artist Michael Fell lived in the town in the 1980s and 1990s. Blind artist Sargy Mann moved to Bungay in 1990 and lived there until his death in 2015. Poet Luke Wright has lived in Bungay since 2010. Children's author and illustrator James Mayhew lives in Bungay.

Darts professional Andrew Gilding lives in Bungay. Gilding won the PDC's UK Open tournament in 2023, defeating Michael van Gerwen 11–10 in the final at Butlin's Minehead Resort.

== Arms ==
Coat of arms of Bungay

Notes
Originally granted to Bungay Urban District Council on 6 July 1953, transferred to the successor parish in 1974.
Crest
On a wreath of the colours a representation of the Black dog of Bungay courant Proper upon a ray of lightning fesswise Gules.
Escutcheon
Barry wavy of six Vert and Argent a Norfolk wherry in full sail Proper pennon flying Gules a chief Or thereon a port between two towers Sable the port ensigned with an escutcheon Gold charged with a cross also Gules.
Motto
Moribus Antiquis Pareamus (Let Us Ever Hold Fast to the Old Virtues)

== See also ==
- Bungay High School
- RAF Bungay
