= Laurence Clinch =

Irish stage actor (1740–1812)

- Born: c. 1740
- Died: 1812
- Occupation: Actor

Laurence Clinch (c. 1740-1812) was an Irish actor and accomplished in both tragedy and comedy. The popular farce St Patrick's Day was written and performed to showcase his particular talent.

== Early career in Ireland ==
A native of Dublin, Clinch gave his first professional stage performances in February 1768 when, billed as "A Young Gentleman", he appeared at the Crow Street Theatre in Henry Mossop's productions of Thomas Otway's The Orphan and Venice Preserved as, respectively, Castalio and Jaffier. He was considered well suited to the roles of such tragic lovers, "his figure being tall, well-made and pleasing, his voice powerful and melodious, and his manner compounded of the modest and agreeable". Such attributes also recommended him for the part of Lothario in Nicholas Rowe's The Fair Penitent, which he played in the following May.

In 1769 he was cast by Mossop in Thomas King’s Wit's Last Stand and Charles Johnson's The Country Lasses and demonstrated a talent for comedy that sprang from his own light-hearted nature, later recalled by the actor Michael Kelly's characterisation of him as "the facetious Larry Clinch". In the same year he played Edgar in King Lear and had the spoken title-role in Mossop's production of the semi-opera King Arthur.

When Mossop's financial difficulties resulted in disbandment of his company, Clinch was engaged by Thomas Dawson and Robert Mahon who had undertaken management of Dublin's Capel Street Theatre. He played for them in the 1770-1771 season alongside Charles Macklin, William Thomas Lewis, John O'Keeffe and Elizabeth Younge, and in 1772 he ventured to England.

== Engagement by Garrick ==
After performing in Norwich, he was engaged by David Garrick at Drury Lane and in October 1772 appeared there in the title-role in Nathaniel Lee’s Alexander the Great. On that occasion he was criticised for insufficient attention to "the dignity of blank verse" but, subject to correcting such deficiency, was forecast to be "a very considerable acquisition to the theatrical world". That he was "a young actor well worthy the patronage of the public" was acknowledged when, in March 1773, he played Alberto in the first production of John Home's tragedy Alonzo, but shortly afterwards he fell out with Garrick.

The pair had been on sufficiently warm terms that Clinch was allowed the freedom of Garrick's box at Drury Lane. One evening he entered the box when the manager was seated at the front with several ladies and, sensing the private nature of the occasion, he remained at the back waiting to leave the box when the current scene concluded. Becoming aware of his presence, Garrick rose and removed the hat from Clinch's head, pointing to the presence of ladies. An embarrassed Clinch withdrew and sent Garrick a note requesting an apology or a meeting. An apology was forthcoming, but Garrick did not renew his contract. (Note: This is Clinch's own account of the matter, as narrated by him at a small dinner-party in the home of Col. Mansergh St George attended by Edward Tighe and the artist J. D. Herbert who later published the conversation. Other accounts suggest that Garrick sought to buy out Clinch's contract and, failing to do so, cast him in such disagreeable characters that he quit Drury Lane in disgust: John Holmes Agnew and Walter Hilliard Bidwell, The Eclectic Magazine of Foreign Literature, Science and Art, Vol. 36, 1855, p. 659; Anon., The Thespian Dictionary, or Dramatic Biography of the Nineteenth Century, T. Hurst, London, 1802 (unpaginated), entry for CLINCH (LAURENCE).)

== Engagement by Sheridan ==
He made several appearances at the Theatre Royal in King Street, Bristol, in August and September 1773, including a benefit performance in the title-role in Arthur Murphy's Alzuma. Returning to Ireland, he acted at Cork and Limerick in 1774, but then resumed his career in London where he joined Richard Brinsley Sheridan's company at Covent Garden. His friendship with Sheridan's actor father, with whom he had played in Dublin, may have been influential in his obtaining this engagement.

In the autumn of 1774 his portrayal of Alexander the Great was considered a qualified improvement on his appearance in the part two years earlier ("he gave the passion utterance more naturally than before but he was extremely deficient in the tender scenes"). However, his later performances as Richmond in Shakespeare's Richard III and as Pharamond in Beaumont and Fletcher's Philaster were commended and he was thought to have "caught the manner" (if not the "persuasive delivery") of Spranger Barry, with whom he had appeared in Murphy's The Grecian Daughter somewhat earlier.

On 17 January 1775 Sheridan staged The Rivals, the first play from his own pen. It was poorly received, partly on account of John Lee's performance in the part of Sir Lucius O'Trigger which rendered the character "ridiculous and disgusting". Sheridan extensively rewrote the play and presented it again on 28 January with Clinch in the role of O'Trigger. This time the production was widely acclaimed: Clinch's performance attracted particularly favourable attention and "perhaps gave the tone to all the subsequent impersonations" of O'Trigger.

In gratitude for Clinch's contribution to the play's success, Sheridan produced the afterpiece St Patrick's Day, or The Scheming Lieutenant, written in the space of 48 hours "expressly to afford opportunity for Clinch’s peculiar talents". This two-act comedy was staged for Clinch's benefit on 2 May 1775 when he played the farcical hero Lieutenant O'Connor. The play achieved enduring popularity, George IV requesting that it and Sheridan's The Duenna were performed for him during his visit to Ireland in 1821.

Clinch's tour de force as Lucius O'Trigger "established his reputation" but, after his performance in the role at Covent Garden, there seems to be no record of his again playing the part. Although he appeared in several later productions of The Rivals, in each case this was in the role of Capt. Jack Absolute, which he first performed at Liverpool's Royal Theatre in August 1775. He continued at Covent Garden in the following season, was again at Liverpool in the summer, and played at Cork in the autumn of 1776.

== Return to Dublin ==
According to The Thespian Dictionary of 1802, Clinch became "the hero of the Irish stage" on returning to his home country following his Covent Garden success. Following an appearance at Cork he joined the company managed by Thomas Ryder at Dublin's Crow Street Theatre, then owned by Spranger Barry. Barry died soon afterwards and ownership of the theatre passed to his widow who, like her late husband, had appeared with Clinch in The Grecian Daughter at Covent Garden.

In November 1776 Clinch was in the casts of Alexander the Great, George Colman's The Jealous Wife, and Congreve's The Double Dealer. In the last he played Mellefont while his (and Mellefont's supposed) friend Thomas Sheridan played Maskwell. In March 1777 he was Capt. Absolute in Ryder's production of The Rivals, the role of O'Trigger being taken by Robert Owenson and Jenny Barsanti reprising her portrayal of Lydia Languish, the character she had played in the play's first run at Covent Garden. Clinch's appearances for Ryder were regular, and he was allowed annual benefit nights; his benefit in May 1778 was a performance of Oliver Goldsmith's The Good-Natur'd Man, Clinch delivering the original prologue written by Samuel Johnson.

Thomas Ryder's financial circumstances were perilous and he was often unable to pay his company. In May 1779, at a command performance of The Fair Penitent for the Irish Viceroy, the Earl of Buckinghamshire, the majority of Ryder's cast refused to proceed with the play unless an immediate instalment of their wage arrears was forthcoming. According to the Dramatic Mirror of 1808 and later accounts, Clinch appeared before the curtain to present the players' demand in this respect, whereupon the Duke left the theatre. However, the contemporary Hibernian Journal reported that the disgruntled players' spokesman was the actor Richard Sparks (son of Isaac Sparks) and that Clinch only appeared "to exculpate himself from any part in the affair". Clinch may have enjoyed greater financial security than many of his fellow players because around this time he married "a spinster of good fortune".

From late 1780 Ryder was in competition with the actor-manager Richard Daly who, having acquired Dublin's Smock Alley Theatre, recruited for his company many of Ryder's key players (including Jenny Barsanti, whom Daly married). In February 1781 Clinch appeared at Smock Alley in the title-role in Othello, and he continued to perform in leading parts there until the season closed in May. For the following season he was engaged by Daly at a weekly salary of ten guineas (more than twice the amount for which Daly had signed John Philip Kemble), but after three weeks he withdrew from the engagement, alleging "improper treatment" by Daly, (Note: In a press statement Clinch declined to particularise the "improper treatment" because it was "uninteresting to the public". Professor Greene has surmised Clinch resented "playing second fiddle" to John Philip Kemble, who had recently triumphed in the Count of Narbonne (in which Clinch was cast in the character of Austin) and had just played the title-role in Othello: John C. Greene, Theatre in Dublin, 1745-1820, A History, Lehigh University Press, 2012, Vol. 3, pp. 2035-2038; Saunders's News-Letter, 25 January 1783, p. 2.) and in March 1782 he appeared on successive nights at Crow Street as Edgar in King Lear and as Rhadamistus in Arthur Murphy's Zenobia. He then continued with Ryder's company at Crow Street for the balance of the season.

== Management at Crow Street ==
Ryder quit Crow Street at the end of 1782, and in January 1783 it was announced that Clinch had taken over management of the theatre "at the Solicitation" of the performers there. It is not clear how long this arrangement continued and whether Clinch staged productions for his own account or managed the house on behalf of Spranger Barry's widow, Ann Street Barry, and her new husband Thomas Crawford. (Note: According to Sir John Gilbert's account of events, Thomas Crawford took over the management of Crow Street after Ryder's departure and Mrs Crawford then refused to go on stage until she received payment "to furnish which the Manager was often obliged to collect the money as it was taken by the doorkeepers": Gilbert, Vol. II, p. 204-205.) The arrangement was evidently short-lived because in November 1783 Clinch played Othello for Daly at Smock Alley.

== Reconciliation with Daly ==
His reconciliation with Daly may have been encouraged by the absence of Kemble from the season's playbill, and he appeared regularly at Smock Alley for the remainder of the 1783-84 season. On successive nights in March he appeared as Colonel Briton in Susanna Centlivre's The Wonder: A Woman keeps a Secret!, as Young Bevil in Richard Steele's The Conscious Lovers, and as Athelwold in the dramatic musical Elfrida. When Sarah Siddons visited the theatre in July–August he played opposite her in Centlivre's The Gamester, Congreve's The Mourning Bride, Nicholas Rowe's Jane Shore, and Otway's Venice Preserved.

His choosing to play in Scotland during the 1784-5 season suggests that the reconciliation with Daly may have been fragile. Shortly beforehand a correspondent of the Dublin Morning Press had complained about Daly's failure to cast Clinch in Thomas Southerne's Oroonoko, declaring Clinch to be "the second performer in the line of tragedy now on the stage".

Clinch seems to have suffered illness or injury prior to arriving in Scotland because in January 1785 the Caledonian Mercury reported he was "so far recovered as to be out of danger but not yet able to travel". However, he was able to play Othello to the "fullest marks of approbation" at Edinburgh's Theatre Royal in February, (Note: This approbation "by an attentive audience" was considered deserved by a critic quoted in David Morison's Old Edinburgh Beaux and Belles (William Paterson, Edinburgh, 1886, at p. 56) but, although Clinch's performance was excellent if "taken altogether", the critic considered it uneven in quality. Morison's book displays an engraving of Clinch and Mary Ann Yates in the roles of the Duke and Duchess which they played in Robert Jephson's tragedy Braganza at Edinburgh in 1785 (ibid, p. 57; Caledonian Mercury, 21 March 1785, p. 1).) and he starred in six other productions there in the weeks that followed. He returned to Edinburgh in July to perform Macbeth to Mrs Siddons' Lady Macbeth, and was back there in February 1786 for a succession of appearances, including in Jane Shore with Mrs Crawford (Ann Street Barry).

His presence at Smock Alley resumed in November 1786, when he played opposite Charlotte Melmoth in Hall Hartson's tragedy The Countess of Salisbury. His frequent performances in the course of that season included an appearance in Sheridan's The School for Scandal alongside both Daly and Mrs Daly, and it may have been on this occasion that there first became fully apparent the chemistry of these three performers' comedic interplay, later so effective when they combined in productions of The Jealous Wife and Murphy's All in the Wrong. He continued at Smock Alley through the 1787-88 season, but did not perform in the summer when John Philip Kemble joined the company.

== Bereavement and work for Sir Vere Hunt ==
During 1789 Clinch again played for Daly (who had removed his undertaking from Smock Alley to the reconditioned Crow Street Theatre), but in November that year Mrs Clinch died at the couple's house in Grafton Street. Although she was a woman of means, these derived from her life-interest in property and, according to the Thespian Dictionary, "with Clinch's wife his fortune died". The same source suggests his reduced circumstances made him submissive to Richard Daly's control but this may be doubted because soon after his bereavement he left Dublin to assist in the management of Sir Vere Hunt's recently established theatrical ventures in Limerick and Waterford, assembling the troupe that opened at Limerick on 31 January 1790 with Shakespeare's As You Like It.

== Final years of performing and death ==
He next performed at Dublin in January 1793 when, in a production of The Jealous Wife, he joined the Dalys in their first stage performance in four years. In the following month he was Leon in John Fletcher's Rule a Wife and Have a Wife, Sir George Touchwood in Hannah Cowley's The Belle's Stratagem, and Heswell in Elizabeth Inchbald's Such Things Are, and he continued to appear throughout this season when he, Daly, Thomas King and Joseph Shepherd Munden were the "chief actors" at Crow Street.

He opened the next season there playing Biron to Siddons's Isabella, the Duke to her Duchess of Braganza, Macbeth to her Lady Macbeth, and Hastings to her Jane Shore, and was regularly in costume prior to his benefit performance as Bireno in Jephson's tragedy The Law of Lombardy on 13 March. He is recorded as appearing in the role of Evander in The Grecian Daughter on 18 June 1794 but, in a letter dated 14 June, the actor Charles Mathews (who had just arrived at Crow Street) reported that Clinch had already left Daly's company.

His career after 1794 seems to be largely uncharted, but he was presumably Clinch of the Liverpool Royal Theatre company who was a mourner attending the funeral of the actor John Palmer at Liverpool in August 1798.

Clinch himself is said to have died at Dublin in 1812.
