= 1767 in literature =

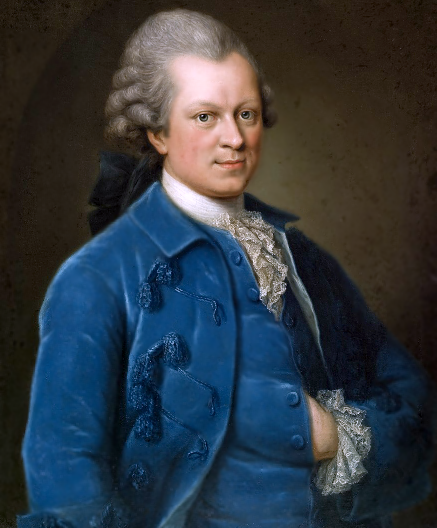
Gotthold Ephraim Lessing

This article presents lists of the literary events and publications in 1767.

== Events ==
- January 29 – The former watchmaker and entrepreneur Pierre Beaumarchais has his first full-length drama, Eugénie, premièred at the Comédie-Française. Revised in two days, it establishes his reputation in this field.
- February – King George III of Great Britain requests an introduction to Samuel Johnson from his librarian, Frederick Augusta Barnard. They meet in the library of the Queen's House.
- April 24 – First professional performance of a play by an American, The Prince of Parthia by Thomas Godfrey (died 1763), at the new Southwark Theatre in Philadelphia with Lewis Hallam Jr. in a leading rôle.
- December 7 – John Street Theatre (Manhattan), the first permanent theater in New York City, is opened by David Douglass with a performance of The Beaux' Stratagem.
- Construction of Teatro Real Coliseo de Carlos III de Aranjuez, the first enclosed theatre in Spain, begins.
- Richard Price's volume of sermons, Four Dissertations, is published by Andrew Millar and Thomas Cadell in London, and he joins the "Bowood circle", a group of liberal intellectuals around William Petty, 2nd Earl of Shelburne, at Bowood House in Wiltshire (England) and corresponds with Benjamin Franklin.
- Publication of the Epistles and Book of Revelation in Manx as Sceeuyn Paul yn Ostyl gys ny Romanee completes the first translation of the New Testament into that language.
- Publication of the first secular prose book in any of the Sorbian languages by Jurij Mjeń.

== New books ==
=== Fiction ===
- James Boswell – Dorando
- Phebe Gibbes – The Woman of Fashion
- Hugh Kelly – Memoirs of a Magdalen
- Susannah Minifie – Barford Abbey
- Frances Sheridan
  - Conclusion of the Memoirs of Miss Sidney Bidulph (posthumous)
  - The History of Nourjahad
- Laurence Sterne – The Life and Opinions of Tristram Shandy, Gentleman vol. ix
- Unca Eliza Winkfield (pseudonym) – The Female American
- Arthur Young – The Adventures of Emmera

=== Drama ===
- Pierre Beaumarchais – Eugénie
- Richard Bentley – Philodamus
- Isaac Bickerstaffe – Lace in the City
- George Colman the Elder
  - The English Merchant
  - The Oxonian in Town
- David Garrick – Cymon
- Hall Hartson – The Countess of Salisbury
- Thomas Hull – The Perplexities
- William Kenrick – The Widowed Wife
- Gotthold Ephraim Lessing – Minna von Barnhelm
- Arthur Murphy – The School for Guardians

=== Poetry ===
- Michael Bruce – Elegy Written in Spring
- Francis Fawkes – Partridge-Shooting
- Oliver Goldsmith, ed. – The Beauties of English Poesy
- Richard Jago – Edge-Hill
- Henry Jones – Kew Garden
- Christopher Smart (translation) – The Works of Horace, Translated into Verse

=== Non-fiction ===
- John Byrom – The Universal English Short-hand
- William Duff – An Essay on Original Genius
- Richard Farmer – An Essay on the Learning of Shakespeare
- Adam Ferguson – An Essay on the History of Civil Society
- Baron d'Holbach, Paul Henry Thiry – Christianisme dévoilé
- Catharine Macaulay – Loose Remarks on Mr. Hobbes's Philosophical Rudiments of Government and Society (on Hobbes's 1651 work)
- Moses Mendelssohn – Phädon
- Joseph Priestley – The History and Present State of Electricity
- William Warburton – Sermons and Discourses
- Arthur Young – The Farmer's Letters to the People of England

== Births ==
- January 1 – Maria Edgeworth, Anglo-Irish novelist (died 1849)
- February 4 – Andrew Marschalk, American printer (died 1838)
- February 6 – Saul Ascher, German political writer and translator (died 1822)
- March 1 – Alexander Balfour, Scottish novelist, short-story writer and poet (died 1829)
- April 9 – Joseph Fiévée, French journalist, essayist, novelist and dramatist (died 1839)
- April 24 – Dorothy Ripley, English missionary and reformist writer (died 1832)
- September 6 – Thomas Bayly Howell, English legal writer (died 1815)
- September 8 – August Wilhelm Schlegel, German poet and translator (died 1845)
- September 10 – Melchiorre Gioia, Italian philosophical writer (died 1829)
- October 25 – Benjamin Constant, Swiss-French novelist (died 1830)
- November 26 (bapt.) – Elizabeth Bentley, English poet (died 1839)
- December 8 – Antoine Fabre d'Olivet, French poet and composer (died 1825)

== Deaths ==
- February 16 – David Erskine Baker, English writer on drama and translator (born 1730)
- February 28 – Charles Balguy, English translator and medical writer (born 1708)
- April 27 – Johann Gottlob Carpzov, German Biblical scholar (born 1679)
- July 15 – Michael Bruce, Scottish poet and hymnist (born 1746)
- July 26 – Paul Gottlieb Werlhof, German poet and physician (born 1699)
- August 21 – Thomas Osborne, English publisher and bookseller (born 1704)
- September 11 – Theophilus Evans, Welsh historian and cleric (born 1693)
- October 1 – Léon Ménard, French historical writer and lawyer (born 1706)
- December 22 – John Newbery, English children's author and publisher (born 1713)
