= Samuel Cautherley =

British stage actor

Samuel Cautherley (c.1747–1805) was a British stage actor. His surname is sometimes spelt as Cautherly.

Born to the actress Jane Green, he was reputed to be the son of David Garrick, actor-manager at the Theatre Royal, Drury Lane. Cautherley began appearing there as a child actor. Sent away to school he quickly returned again to the stage in 1760 and, after another short period away, in 1765. Despite the assistance of Garrick, he was often criticised in the press. He played Charles Dudley in Cumberland's The West Indian and appeared in a mixture of lead and supporting roles until falling out with Garrick in 1775, after which he quit the stage.

== Selected roles ==
- Jasper in Miss in Her Teens by David Garrick (1755)
- Dorilas in Merope by George Jeffreys (1766)
- Dauphin in King John by William Shakespeare (1766)
- Hamlet in Hamlet by William Shakespeare (1766)
- Romeo in Romeo and Juliet by William Shakespeare (1766)
- Lovel in High Life Below Stairs by James Townley (1767)
- Charles in The Jealous Wife by George Colman (1767)
- Sidney in False Delicacy by Hugh Kelly (1768)
- Charles in The Hypocrite by Isaac Bickerstaffe (1768)
- Lord Eustace in The School for Rakes by Elizabeth Griffith (1769)
- Hamlet in The Jubilee by David Garick (1769)
- Villars in A Word to the Wise by Hugh Kelly (1770)
- Charles Dudley in The West Indian by Cumberland (1771)
- Alwin in The Countess of Salisbury by Hall Hartson (1773)
- Rivers in The Note of Hand by Cumberland (1774)

== Bibliography ==
- Straub, Kristina, G. Anderson, Misty and O'Quinn, Daniel . The Routledge Anthology of Restoration and Eighteenth-Century Drama. Taylor & Francis, 2017.
