= The Hypocrite =

1768 play

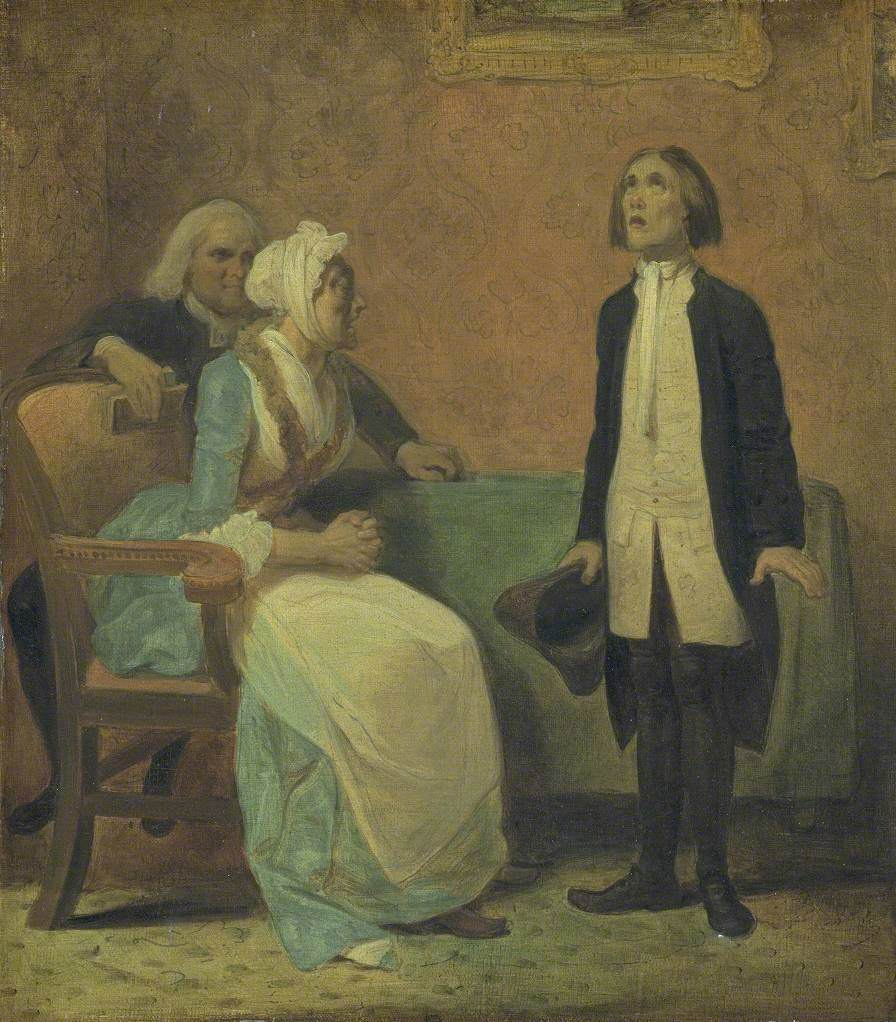
- A scene from the play painted by Robert Smirke.
- Original language: English
- Written by: Isaac Bickerstaffe
- Genre: Comedy

Premiere
- Date: 17 November 1768
- Place: Theatre Royal, Drury Lane

The Hypocrite is a 1768 comic play by the Irish writer Isaac Bickerstaffe. It is a reworking of the 1717 play The Non-Juror by Colley Cibber, itself inspired by Molière's Tartuffe.

The original play had derived much of its humour from the politics of the era, and revolved around the intrigues of Doctor Wolf, a nonjuring clergyman with strong ties to the underground Jacobite movement. Bickerstaffe altered the role to that of Doctor Cantwell, a hypocritical Methodist.

The first Drury Lane cast included Thomas King as Doctor Cantwell, John Hayman Packer as Sir John Lambert, Samuel Reddish as Darnley, Samuel Cautherley as Charles, Thomas Weston as Mawworm, Mary Bradshaw as Old Lady Lambert, Ann Street Barry as Lady Lambert and Frances Abington as Charlotte. It premiered in Bickerstaffe's native Dublin in 1772, and was revived in London on several occasions. A 1814 revival featured William Dowton, Benjamin Wrench and William Oxberry amongst others.

== Bibliography ==
- Hogan, C.B (ed.) The London Stage, 1660–1800: Volume V. Southern Illinois University Press, 1968.
- Kinne, Willard Austin. Revivals and Importations of French Comedies in England, 1749-1800.
- Nicoll, Allardyce. History of English Drama, 1660-1900, Volume 2. Cambridge University Press, 2009.
