= The Widowed Wife =

1767 play

- Original language: English
- Written by: William Kenrick
- Genre: Comedy

Premiere
- Date: 5 December 1767
- Place: Theatre Royal, Drury Lane, London

The Widowed Wife is a 1767 comedy play by William Kenrick. It premiered at Drury Lane Theatre on 5 December 1767. It closely resembled the plot of Memoirs of a Magdalen a novel by Hugh Kelly. The play enjoyed a fairly successful run.

The original Drury Lane cast included Samuel Reddish as Fred Melmoth, Thomas King as Syllogism, Charles Holland as General Melmoth, Francis Aickin as Colonel Camply, James Aickin as Lord Courtly, James William Dodd as Doctor Mineral, John Palmer as Furnival, Hannah Pritchard as Mrs Mildmay, Frances Abington as Narcissa, Mary Bradshaw as Susan and Kitty Clive as Sift.

== Bibliography ==
- Bataille, Robert R. The Writing Life of Hugh Kelly: Politics, Journalism and Theater in Late-Eighteenth Century London. Southern Illinois University Press, 2000.
