= The Choleric Man =

1774 play

- Original language: English
- Written by: Richard Cumberland
- Genre: Comedy
- Setting: England, present day

Premiere
- Date: 10 December 1774
- Place: Theatre Royal, Drury Lane, London

The Choleric Man is a 1774 comedy play by the British author Richard Cumberland. It premiered at the Theatre Royal, Drury Lane in London on 10 December 1774. The original cast included Thomas King as Andrew Nightshade, James Aickin as Manlove, John Hayman Packer as Stapleton, Samuel Reddish as Charles Manlove, Thomas Weston as Jack Nightshade, Robert Baddeley as Dibble, John Moody as Gregory, Francis Godolphin Waldron as Frampton. Roger Wright as Frederick, Elizabeth Hopkins as Mrs Stapleton, Frances Abington as Laetitia and Jane Pope as Lucy. The play's Irish premiere took place at the Crow Street Theatre in Dublin on 14 April 1777. It also appeared later at the Theatre Royal, Covent Garden.

== Bibliography ==
- Greene, John C. Theatre in Dublin, 1745-1820: A Calendar of Performances, Volume 6. Lexington Books, 2011.
- Nicoll, Allardyce. A History of English Drama 1660–1900: Volume III. Cambridge University Press, 2009.
- Hogan, C.B (ed.) The London Stage, 1660–1800: Volume V. Southern Illinois University Press, 1968.
