= Samuel Reddish =

English theatre manager and actor (1735–1785)

Samuel Reddish (1735–1785) was a theatre manager and an actor in England. He made a reputation with Mossop's company in Smock Alley, Dublin in the seasons of 1761-2 and appeared at Drury Lane, London, 1767, where he remained during ten seasons; acted at Covent Garden, London, 1778, but lost his reason, 1779; he died a lunatic at York asylum on 31 December 1785.

== Selected roles ==
- Fred Melmoth in The Widowed Wife by William Kenrick (1767)
- Lord Winworth in False Delicacy by Hugh Kelly (1768)
- Zemouca in Zingis by Alexander Dow (1768)
- Darnley in The Hypocrite by Isaac Bickerstaffe (1768)
- Frampton in The School for Rakes by Elizabeth Griffith (1769)
- Orellan in The Fatal Discovery by John Home (1769)
- Sir John Dormer in A Word to the Wise by Hugh Kelly (1770)
- Philotus in The Grecian Daughter by Arthur Murphy (1772)
- Tyrell in The Fashionable Lover by Richard Cumberland (1772)
- Alonzo in Alonzo by John Home (1773)
- Charles Manlove in The Choleric Man by Richard Cumberland (1774)
- Menes in Sethona by Alexander Dow (1774)
- Charles Manlove in The Choleric Man by Richard Cumberland (1774)
- Duke in Braganza by Robert Jephson (1775)
