= A Word to the Wise =

1770 play

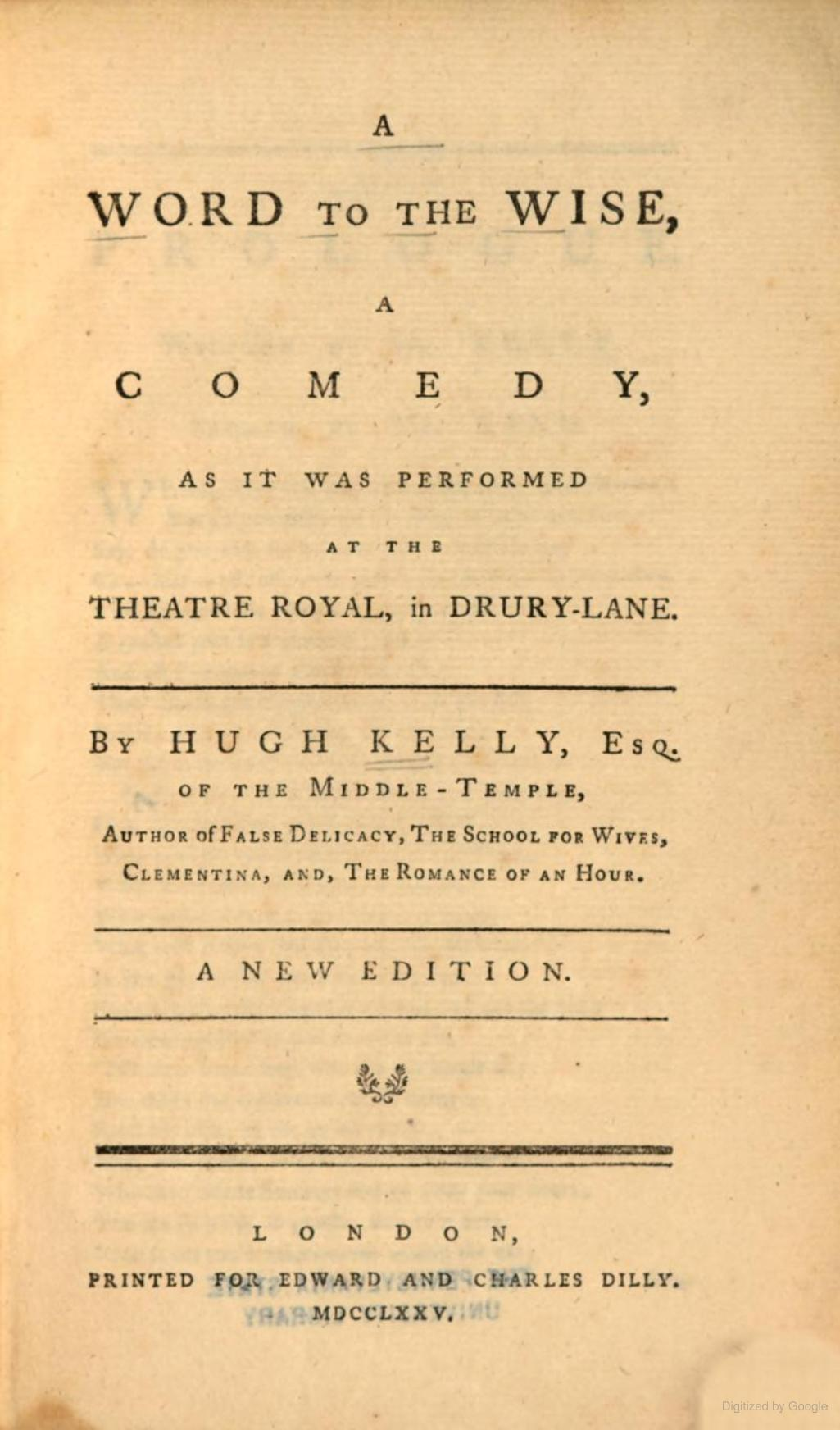
- Original language: English
- Written by: Hugh Kelly
- Genre: Comedy

Premiere
- Date: 3 March 1770
- Place: Theatre Royal, Drury Lane, London

A Word to the Wise is a 1770 comedy play by the Irish writer Hugh Kelly. It was his second work after the 1767 hit False Delicacy. Kelly was known as a supporter of the government, and an opponent of the radical John Wilkes. During the second performance of the play a riot broke out amongst Wilkes' supporters at the Drury Lane Theatre and the play was subsequently withdrawn. When it was published instead Kelly wrote a long introduction defending himself and complaining about political prejudice. It was the first play performed at The Theatre, Leeds when it was opened on 24 May 1771. It was later staged by the American Company in North America.

The original Drury Lane cast included John Palmer as Captain Dormer, Thomas King as Sir George Hastings, Samuel Reddish as Sir John Dormer, Samuel Cautherley as Villars, James Wrighten as Footman, Ann Street Barry as Miss Montague, Elizabeth Younge as Miss Dormer and Sophia Baddeley as Miss Willoughby.

== Bibliography ==
- Baines, Paul & Ferarro, Julian & Rogers, Pat. The Wiley-Blackwell Encyclopedia of Eighteenth-Century Writers and Writing, 1660-1789. Wiley-Blackwell, 2011.
- Shaffer, Jason. Performing Patriotism: National Identity in the Colonial and Revolutionary American Theater. University of Pennsylvania Press, 2007
