= The Note of Hand =

1774 comedy play

- Original language: English
- Written by: Richard Cumberland
- Genre: Comedy
- Setting: Newmarket, present day

Premiere
- Date: 9 February 1774
- Place: Theatre Royal, Drury Lane, London

The Note of Hand, or Trip to Newmarket is a 1774 comedy play by the British writer Richard Cumberland. A farce it was the final play performed by David Garrick at the Drury Lane Theatre in London before his retirement. The Irish premiere took place at the Capel Street Theatre in Dublin on 10 March 1774. The original London cast included John Palmer as Revell, Samuel Cautherley as Rivers, Thomas Jefferson as Elder Rivers, John Moody as O'Connor MacCormuck, William Palmer as Francis, James William Dodd as Sapling, James Wrighten as Putty and Susan Greville as Mrs Cheveley.

It is set against the backdrop of Newmarket Racecourse. The play mocked some of the leading Whig politicians of the era such as Charles Fox and the Duke of Devonshire. This may have been the cause of Cumberland's dispute with Richard Brinsley Sheridan who was a Whig. Sheridan went on to create a comedy character Sir Fretful Plagiary closely based on Cumberland in the 1779 play The Critic.

== Bibliography ==
- Greene, John C. Theatre in Dublin, 1745-1820: A Calendar of Performances, Volume 6. Lexington Books, 2011.
- Mudford, William. The Life of Richard Cumberland. Sherwood, Neely & Jones, 1812.
- Nicoll, Allardyce. A History of English Drama 1660-1900. Volume III: Late Eighteenth Century Drama. Cambridge University Press, 1952.
