= Thomas Parkinson (painter) =

British artist

Thomas Parkinson (born 10 December 1744, Oxford – died c. 1789) was a British portrait-painter. He became a student in the schools of the Royal Academy in 1772.

== Works ==
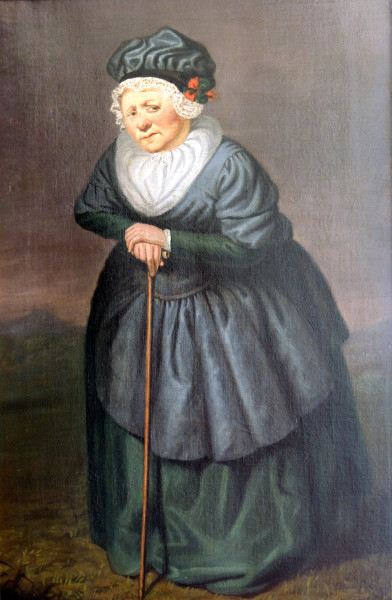
Mary Bradshaw in Cymon by Parkinson

Parkinson was known as a painter of theatrical figures and groups. He also practised regularly as a portrait-painter, and exhibited portraits at the Free Society of Artists in 1769 and 1770, and at the Royal Academy from 1773 to 1789. Some of these were engraved, including:

- William Balmain (by Richard Earlom),
- William Woodfall (by Isaac Jehner),
- Jonathan Britain, forger (by John Raphael Smith), and others.

Among his theatrical groups were:

- Mr. Weston in the character of Billy Button in 'The Maid of Bath' (Incorporated Society of Artists, 1772);
- Mr. Shuter, with Mr. Quick and Mrs. Green, in a scene from "She stoops to conquer" (engraved by Robert Laurie, 1776);
- A Scene from Cymon (Royal Academy, 1773);
- A Scene from The Duenna (Royal Academy, 1774);
- Garrick led off the Stage by Time with Tragedy and Comedy (engraved by Robert Laurie, 1779).

A number of Parkinson's small theatrical portraits were engraved. Some of the original drawings for these went to the Burney collection of theatrical portraits in the print-room at the British Museum.

== Notes ==
Attribution

This article incorporates text from a publication now in the public domain: Lee, Sidney, ed. (1895). "Parkinson, Thomas (fl.1769-1789)". Dictionary of National Biography. Vol. 43. London: Smith, Elder & Co.
