= High Life Below Stairs =

1759 comedy play by James Townley

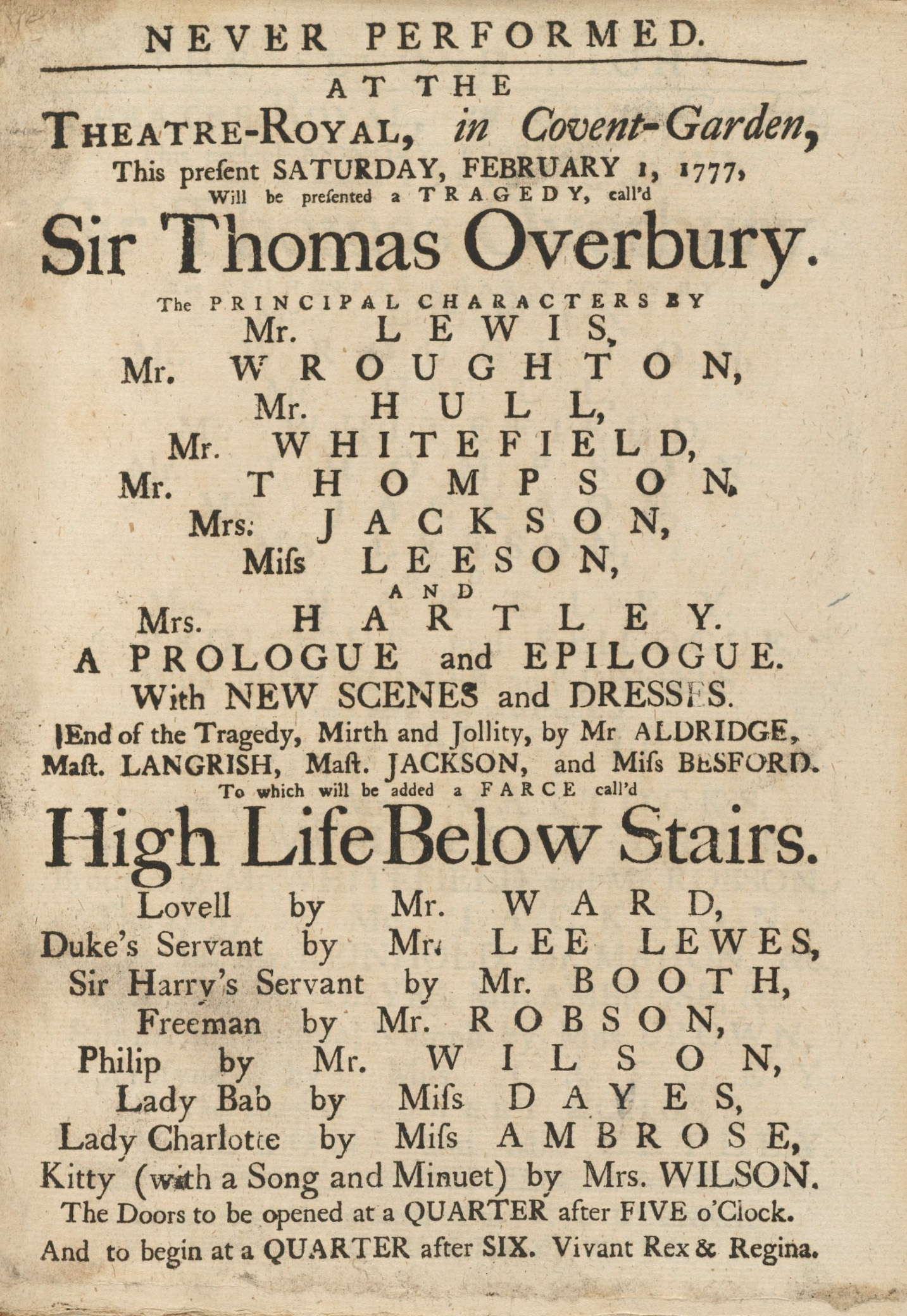
- The play on a 1777 Covent Garden double bill
- Written by: James Townley
- Original language: English
- Genre: Comedy

Premiere
- Date premiered: 31 October 1759
- Place premiered: Theatre Royal, Drury Lane, London

High Life Below Stairs is a 1759 comedy play by the British writer James Townley. An afterpiece, it premiered at Drury Lane on a double bill with a revival of Congreve's The Mourning Bride. A popular hit, it was frequently revived.

The original Drury Lane cast John Palmer as Duke's servant, Thomas King as Sir Harry's servant, William O'Brien as Lovel, Richard Yates as Philip, John Hayman Packer as Freeman, Thomas Mozeen as Tom, John Moody as Kingston Mary Bradshaw as Cook, Frances Abington as Lady Bab's maid and Kitty Clive as Kitty.

== Bibliography ==
- Baines, Paul & Ferarro, Julian & Rogers, Pat. The Wiley-Blackwell Encyclopedia of Eighteenth-Century Writers and Writing, 1660–1789. Wiley-Blackwell, 2011.
- Watson, George. The New Cambridge Bibliography of English Literature: Volume 2, 1660–1800. Cambridge University Press, 1971.
- Worrall, David. Harlequin Empire: Race, Ethnicity and the Drama of the Popular Enlightenment. Routledge, 2015.
