= False Delicacy =

1768 play

- Original language: English
- Written by: Hugh Kelly
- Genre: Comedy

Premiere
- Date: 23 January 1768
- Place: Theatre Royal, Drury Lane, London

False Delicacy is a 1768 comedy play by the Irish playwright Hugh Kelly, with some assistance by David Garrick. It premiered at the Drury Lane Theatre on 23 January. The play was a major success for Kelly, being performed over twenty times during its first season and selling ten thousand printed copies within a year. It was subsequently translated into German, French and Portuguese.

The original Drury Lane cast included Thomas King as Cecil, Samuel Reddish as Lord Winworth, Charles Holland as Colonel Rivers, John Palmer as Sir Harry Newburgh, Samuel Cautherley as Sidney, Frances Abington as Lady Betty Lambton, Ann Street Barry as Mrs Harley and Sophia Baddeley as Miss Marchont. It was staged at the same time Oliver Goldsmith's The Good Natur'd Man was being performed at Covent Garden, and the two plays were seen as being in competition.

== Plot ==
Lord Windworth and Lady Betty Lambton are in love, but Betty is too shy and delicate to admit it, feeling rejected. Winworth seeks Miss Marchmont, and she only accepts him because she believes that Betty agrees.

== Bibliography ==
- Bataille, Robert R. The Writing Life of Hugh Kelly: Politics, Journalism and Theater in Late-Eighteenth Century London. Southern Illinois University Press, 2000.
- Sherburne, George and Bond, Donald F. A Literary History of England, Volume III: The Restoration and Eighteenth Century. Routledge and Kegan Paul, 1967.
- Dunn, Joseph & Lennox, P.J. The Glories of Ireland. Bastian Books, 2008.
