= Robert Laurie (engraver) =

Scottish engraver and publisher

- Born: c. 1755
- Died: 19 May 1836 (aged c. 81); Broxbourne, England, British Empire
- Occupation(s): mezzotint engraver and publisher
- Known for: maps, and printing in colours, using à la poupée inking
- Children: 1 son

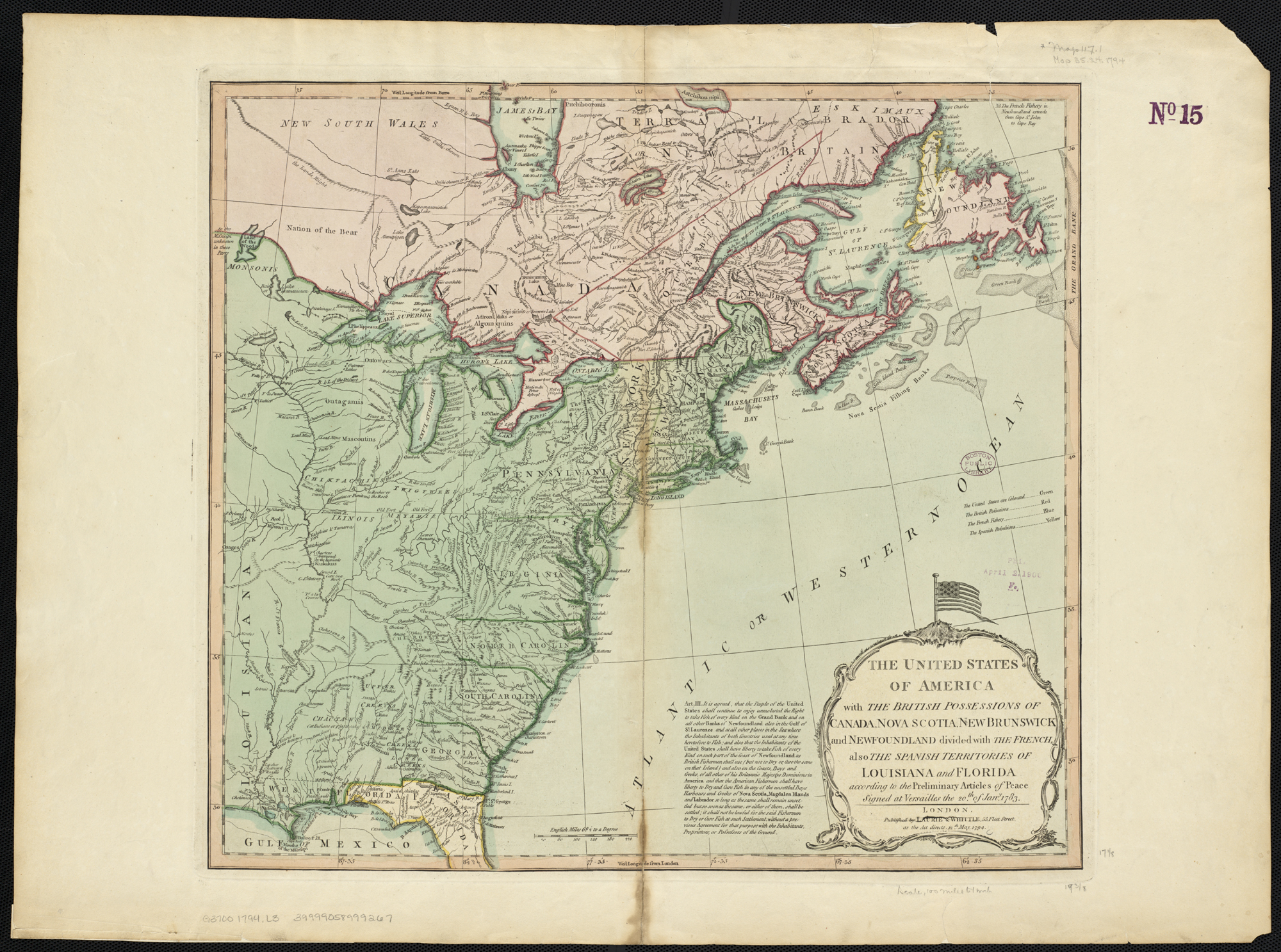
Map, The United States of America with the British possessions of Canada, 1794

Robert Laurie (c. 1755 – 19 May 1836) was an Anglo-Scottish mezzotint engraver and publisher. He signed his name as Lowery, Lowry, Lowrie, Lawrey, Lawrie, or Laurie.

== Early years ==
Born around 1755, his background was the Lauries of Maxwelton, Dumfriesshire. He received from the Society of Arts in 1770 a silver palette for a drawing from a picture, and in 1773, 1775, and 1776 premiums for designs of patterns for calico-printing.

== Work ==
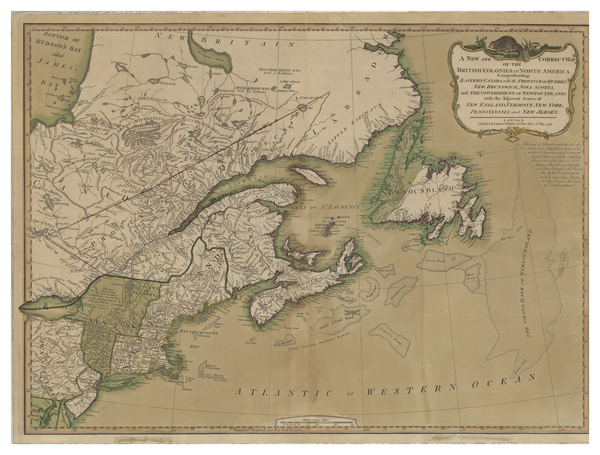
A New and Correct map of the British Colonies in North America comprehending Eastern Canada with the Province of Quebec, New Brunswick, Nova Scotia, and the Government of Newfoundland

His earliest portraits in mezzotint are dated 1771. He was a relatively early British user of the à la poupée method of printing in colours, extending the number of colours considerably, and for this received from the Society of Arts in 1776 a bounty of thirty guineas. Early in 1794, in partnership with James Whittle, he succeeded to the business carried on by Robert Sayer at the Golden Buck in Fleet Street, London as a publisher of engravings, maps, charts, and nautical works. Major charts published by this firm were James Cook's Survey of the South Coast of Newfoundland (1776) and the Surveys of St. George's Channel, (1777). Laurie then gave up the practice of engraving. He retired from business in 1812, and the firm continued as Whittle & Laurie, but the business was run by his son, Richard Holmes Laurie, who, on the death of Whittle in 1818, became the sole proprietor. L. S. De la Rochette and John Purdy were the hydrographers to the firm.

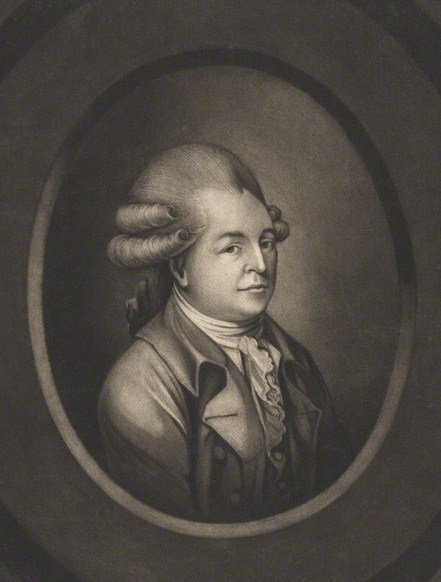
Portrait of James Dodd (c. 1740–1796), an English actor, from 10 July 1779 by Engraver Robert Laurie, after Robert Dighton

== Death ==
Robert Laurie died at Broxbourne, Hertfordshire, on 19 May 1836, aged around 81. His son died at 53 Fleet Street, on 19 January 1858, also at the age of 81, leaving two daughters.

== Works ==
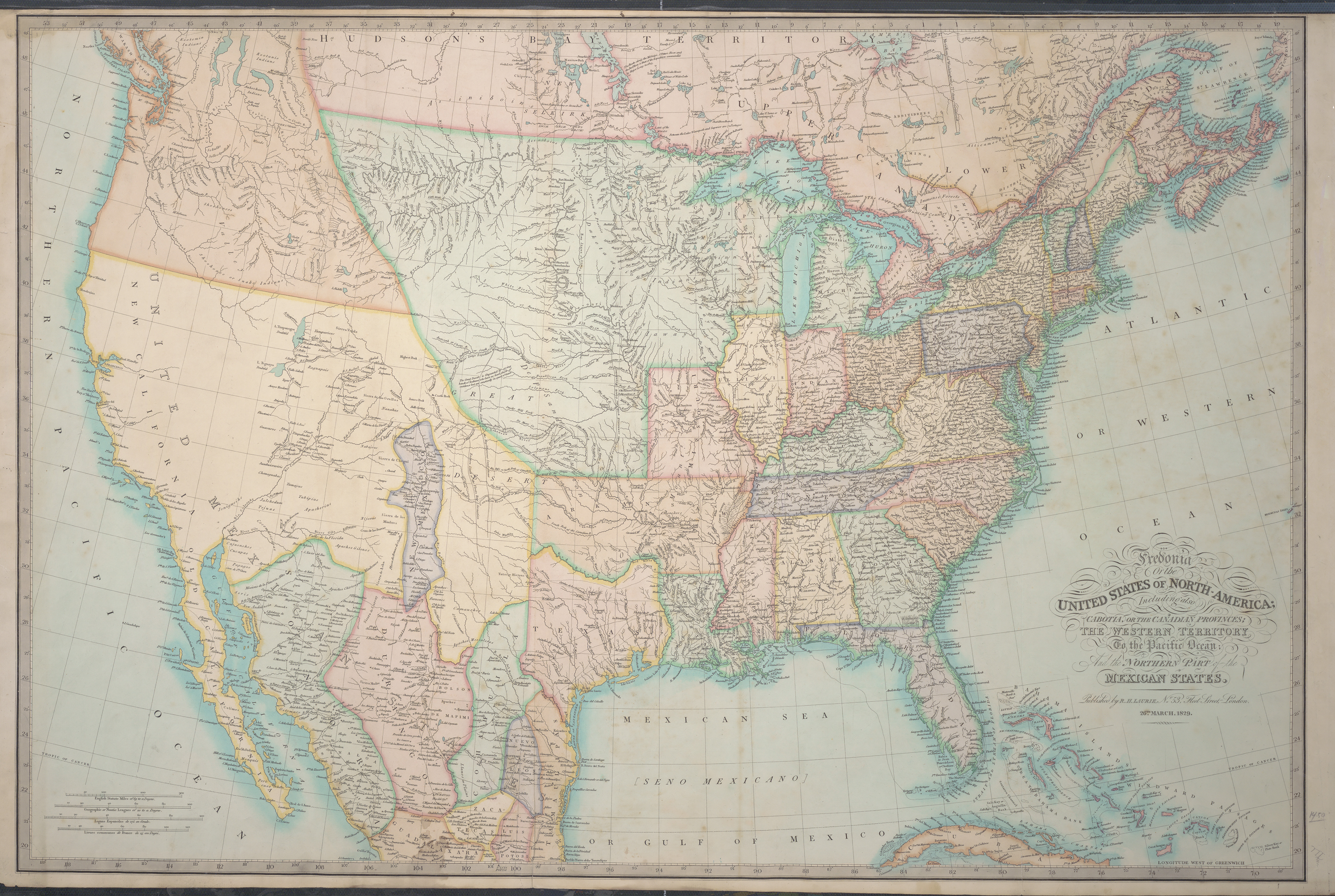
Laurie's Fredonia or the United States of North America, 1829

Major subject prints by Laurie were:

- The Adoration of the Magi, The Return from Egypt, The Crucifixion, and St. John the Evangelist, after Rubens
- The Crucifixion, after Vandyck
- The Incredulity of St. Thomas, after Rembrandt
- The Holy Family, after Guercino
- Christ crucified, after Annibale Carracci
- The Adoration of the Magi, after Andrea Casali
- The Quack Doctor, after Christian Wilhelm Ernst Dietrich
- The Flemish Rat-catcher and The Itinerant Singer, after Adriaen van Ostade
- The Wrath of Achilles, after Antoine Coypel
- A Hard Gale and A Squall, after Joseph Vernet
- The Oath of Calypso, Diana and her Nymphs bathing, and a Madonna, after Angelica Kauffman
- Sunrise: landscape with fishermen, after George Barret
- The Naval Victory of Lord Rodney, after Robert Dodd
- Young Lady confessing to a Monk, after William Millar
- Court of Equity, or Convivial City Meeting, after Robert Dighton
- The Rival Milliners and The Jealous Maids, after John Collet
- The Full of the Honeymoon and The Wane of the Honeymoon, after Francis Wheatley
- a scene from She Stoops to Conquer, with portraits of Shuter, Quick, and Mrs. Green, after Thomas Parkinson
- a scene from The School for Scandal, with portraits of Mrs. Abington, King, Smith, and Palmer, from a drawing by himself.

Portraits include those of:

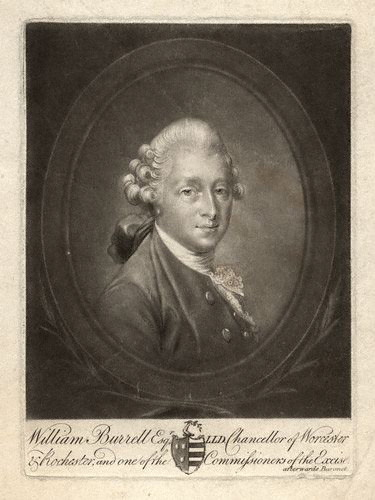
William Burrell engraving by Robert Laurie, c. 1789

- George III and Queen Charlotte, after Zoffany
- Queen Charlotte, with the Princess Royal and Princess Sophia Augusta, and George, prince of Wales, with Frederick, duke of York, two groups after his own designs
- David Garrick, after Sir Joshua Reynolds
- Garrick led off the Stage by Time towards the Temple of Fame, after Thomas Parkinson
- Garrick with Mrs. Bellamy, as Romeo and Juliet, after Benjamin Wilson
- Mrs. Baddeley, the actress, after Zoffany;
- Elizabeth Gunning, duchess of Argyll, two plates after Catharine Read
- Jemima, countess Cornwallis, after Sir Joshua Reynolds
- Richard Howe, 1st Earl Howe, after Peter Mequignon
- John Jervis, 1st Earl of St Vincent;
- Étienne François, duc de Choiseul, full-length, after Jean-Baptiste van Loo;
- Georgiana, Duchess of Devonshire
- Joseph Ames

and a series of twelve portraits of actors, after Robert Dighton.
