= Alfred (play) =

Play by John Home

- Original language: English
- Written by: John Home
- Genre: Tragedy

Premiere
- Date: 21 January 1778
- Place: Covent Garden Theatre, London

Alfred is a 1778 tragedy by the British writer John Home. His final play it was not as well-received as his earlier efforts and he retired from playwriting.

The original Covent Garden cast included William Thomas Lewis as Alfred, Thomas Hull as Edwin, John Whitfield as Earl of Surrey, Francis Aickin as Hinguar, Ann Street Barry as Ethelswida. The epilogue was written by David Garrick.

== Bibliography ==
- Nicoll, Allardyce. A History of English Drama 1660–1900: Volume III. Cambridge University Press, 2009.
- Hogan, C.B (ed.) The London Stage, 1660–1800: Volume V. Southern Illinois University Press, 1968.
