= Alonzo (play) =

Play by John Home

- Original language: English
- Written by: John Home
- Genre: Tragedy

Premiere
- Date: 27 March 1773
- Place: Theatre Royal, Drury Lane, London

Alonzo is a 1773 tragedy by the British writer John Home.

The original Drury Lane cast included Samuel Reddish as Alonzo, Francis Aickin as King of Asturia, James Aickin as Costolo, Thomas Jefferson as Velasco, John Palmer as Sebastian, Laurence Clinch as Alberto, John Bannister as Messenger and Ann Street Barry as Orisminda.

== Bibliography ==
- Nicoll, Allardyce. A History of English Drama 1660–1900: Volume III. Cambridge University Press, 2009.
- Hogan, C.B (ed.) The London Stage, 1660–1800: Volume V. Southern Illinois University Press, 1968.
