= The Fatal Discovery =

Play by John Home

- Original language: English
- Written by: John Home
- Genre: Tragedy

Premiere
- Date: 23 February 1769
- Place: Theatre Royal, Drury Lane, London

The Fatal Discovery is a 1769 tragedy by the British writer John Home. It premiered at the Theatre Royal, Drury Lane in London. The original cast included Spranger Barry as Ronan, Samuel Reddish as Orellan, Francis Aickin as Connan, John Palmer as Durstan, Thomas Jefferson as Kathul, James Aickin as Euran and Ann Street Barry as Rivine.

== Bibliography ==
- Nicoll, Allardyce. A History of English Drama 1660–1900: Volume III. Cambridge University Press, 2009.
- Hogan, C.B (ed.) The London Stage, 1660–1800: Volume V. Southern Illinois University Press, 1968.
