= Mary Mozeen =

British singer and actress

- Born: Mary Edwards; 1724 or before
- Died: 1773
- Occupations: singer and actress
- Known for: protogee of Kitty Clive
- Spouse: Thomas Mozeen
- Children: one

Mary Mozeen born Mary Edwards (before 1724? – 1773?) was a British singer and actress.

== Life ==
Her parents may have been Thomas and Mary Edwards. Her father was a member of the King's music and he made a change in his will in 1724 to favour his children Mary and Thomas. So this would make her birthdate to be 1724 or before.

It is thought that she was trained by the actress Kitty Clive. She first appeared on stage with the Lilliputian Company on 17 November 1737. Her skills as a singer were soon valued and she became an established name. Her first few parts were in The Burgomaster Trick'd, Henry Carey's The Dragon of Wantley and then Glowworm in Robin Goodfellow. It was said that she blushed when sexual jokes were made.

On 8 March 1740 the hugely successful Kitty Clive appeared as Rosamond at Drury Lane in Thomas Arne's opera of the same name. Clive had assisted her and she became her protegee and she took the role of the page. Clive had a benefit on 17 March 1740 and Edwards appeared there too.

In 1741 she was with the actors at Lincoln's Inn Fields Theatre where her soprano voice was used in works by Handel.

In 1744 she returned to Covent Garden where she appearrd with Kitty. She was in The Merchant of Venice on 17 March.

She married a fellow actor and writer named Thomas Mozeen on 19 May 1746. It was said that in time she and Kitty Clive were estranged. One source says this was due to Mary marrying a man - as Clive is thought to have been bisexual. In 1748 "Mrs Mozeen" and "Thomas Mozeen" went to Ireland where they were employed by Thomas Sheridan in Dublin. She returned to work for Sheridan in 1748. He resurfaced in 1750 where he worked in secondary roles at Drury Lane for fourteen years. Her husband's only published play, Heiress, or Antigallican, was centred on a girl who was brought up as a boy. The play was performed once in 1759 at a benefit and published later.

Her husband died in 1768 and her death is presumed in 1773.
