= Ann Street Barry =

British actress (1734–1801)

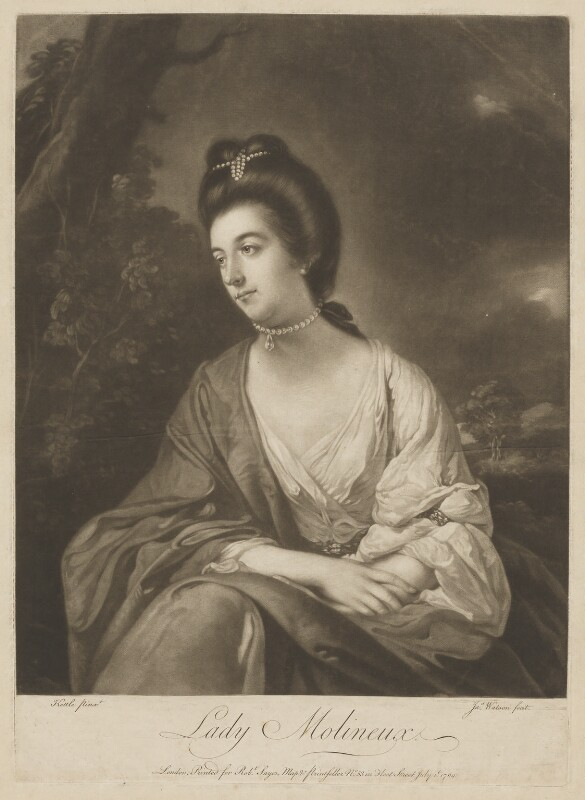
Lady Molineux as played by Anne Street Barry

Ann Street Barry aka Ann Dancer later Ann Crawford (1734 – 29 November 1801), was a British singer, dancer and stage actress.

== Life ==
Barry was born in Bath, England, to an apothecary named James Street. Her brother, William Street, later became the Mayor of Bath in 1784 and died in office. She began her acting career with her first husband, William Dancer, with her first known performance in 1758 as Cordelia in King Lear. Lear was played by Spranger Barry in the same play and the two began an affair. Barry's then-husband William Dancer died in 1759, allowing the couple to continue their relationship and later marry in 1768.

In 1759 she appeared in Dublin, where she played a number of leading roles to limited success. At some point during the following nine years, she moved to London with Spranger Barry and performed at Drury Lane. Her performances at Drury Lane were well received and raised her reputation as an actress.

Barry left Drury Lane for Covent Garden, where she continued to perform with her second husband. After his death, she remained at Covent Garden and later remarried, first billed under her new married name of Mrs Crawford in 1778. Her last known appearance was as Lady Randolph in John Home's Douglas in 1798. Her portrayal of Lady Randolph and Desdemona were credited as her greatest roles, with one contemporary actress (Sarah Siddons) writing a letter in which she describes her fear of Barry's skill.

Barry married again to a barrister and actor and became Ann Crawford. However she was buried with Spranger Barry in Westminster Abbey following her death in 1801.

== Selected roles ==
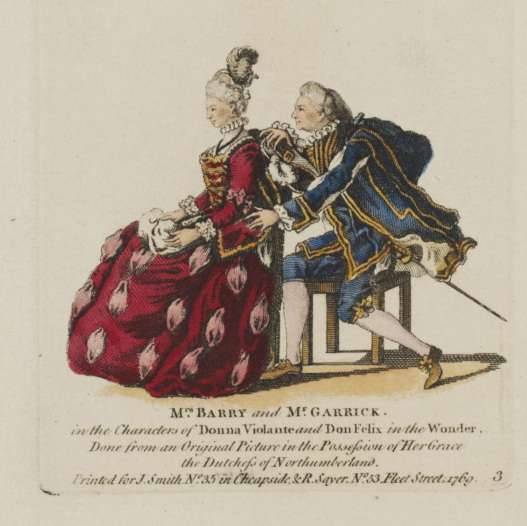
Anne Street Barry and Garrick in 1759

- Countess of Salisbury in The Countess of Salisbury by Hall Hartson (1767)
- Mrs Harley in False Delicacy by Hugh Kelly (1768)
- Zenobia in Zenobia by Arthur Murphy (1768)
- Rivine in The Fatal Discovery by John Home (1769)
- Miss Montague in A Word to the Wise by Hugh Kelly (1770)
- Augusta Aubrey in The Fashionable Lover by Richard Cumberland (1772)
- Euphrasia in The Grecian Daughter by Arthur Murphy (1772)
- Orisminda in Alonzo by John Home (1773)
- Sethona in Sethona by Alexander Dow (1774)
- Eleonora in Edward and Eleonora by James Thomson (1775)
- Elwina in Percy by Hannah More (1777)
- Ethelswida in Alfred by John Home (1778)
- Dienira in The Royal Suppliants by John Delap (1781)
