= St Patrick's Day (play) =

Play by Richard Brinsley Sheridan

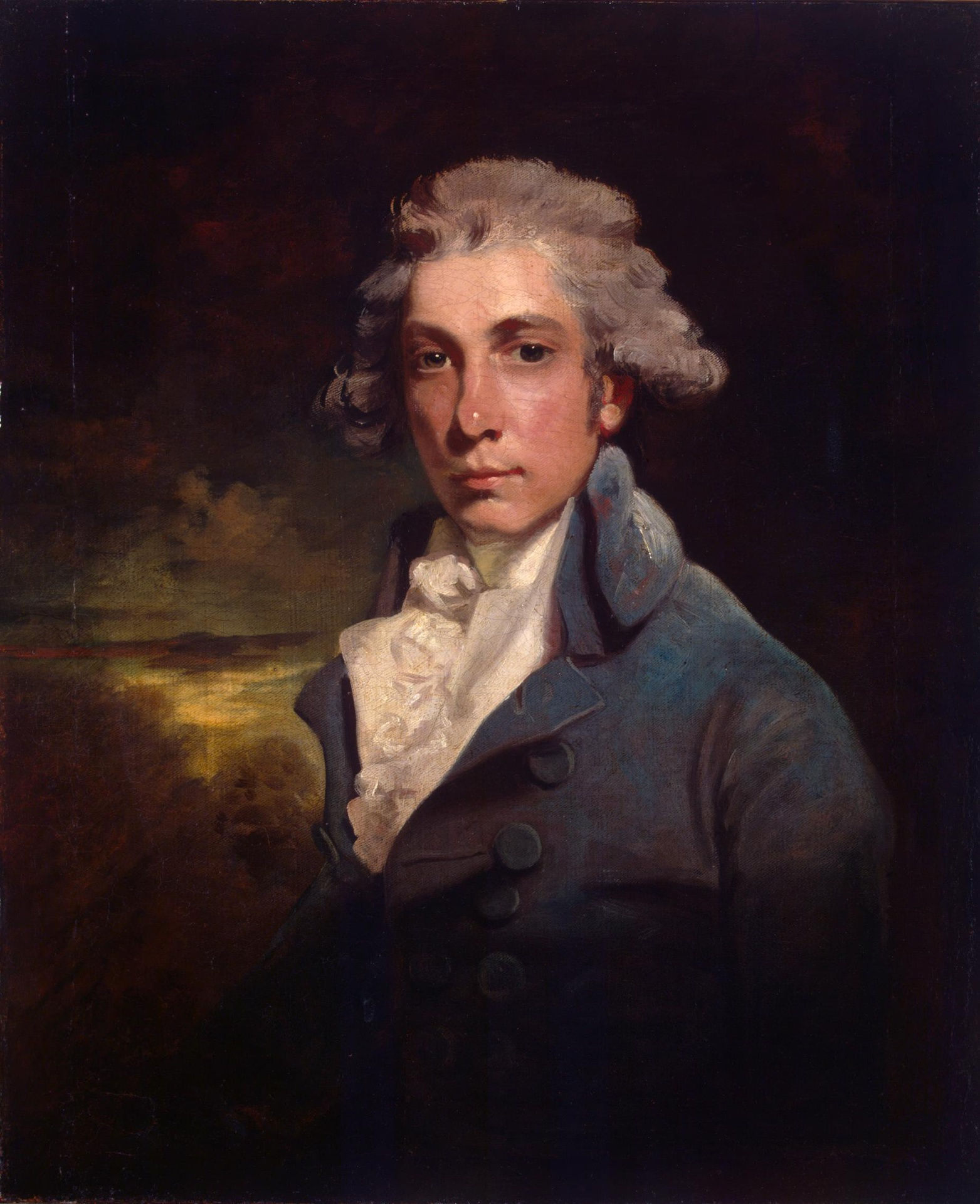
Richard Brinsley Sheridan, the play's author

St Patrick's Day, or, The Scheming Lieutenant is an 18th-century play by the Anglo-Irish playwright and poet Richard Brinsley Sheridan (1751–1816), first performed on 2 May 1775 at Covent Garden Theatre. It is said to have completed by the author within two days. Sheridan wrote the two-act farce for the benefit performance of lead actor Laurence Clinch, who had so successfully played Sir Lucius O'Trigger in his previous play The Rivals.

== Characters and original cast ==
- Lieutenant O’Connor - Mr. Clinch.
- Dr. Rosy - Mr. Quick.
- Justice Credulous - Mr. Lewis
- Sergeant Trounce - Mr. Booth.
- Corporal Flint
- Lauretta - Mrs. Cargill.
- Mrs. Bridget Credulous - Mrs. Pitt.
- Drummer, soldiers, countrymen, and servant.

Scene — a town in country England.

== Plot ==
The action of the play takes place on St Patrick's day. The farcical Irish hero Lieutenant O'Connor is in love with Lauretta, daughter of Justice Credulous. The lieutenant and his men are billeted on the town where the Justice's family lives, and although the lovers are thus continually in close proximity, Lauretta's jealous father prevents them from often meeting. O'Connor's men complain that "ever since your honour differed with justice Credulous, our inn-keepers use us most scurvily ... so we humbly petition that your honour would make an end of the matter at once, by running away with the justice's daughter". Their complaints are of no serious turn however, one soldier grieving that he is not allowed a "light to go to bed by" at his inn, whereas the provocation they give includes occasionally "fling[ing] a cartridge into the kitchen fire", or "drum[ming] up and down stairs" during the night.

Dr Rosy, a man of sentimental character who is obsessively mourning the recent loss of his beloved wife Dolly, is a friend of the Lieutenant's. He now helps him to formulate a plot to elope with Lauretta, by first insinuating himself into the Judge's confidence in disguise. Lauretta, meanwhile, secretly favours the Lieutenant's advances. She tells this to her mother, Mrs. Bridget Credulous, who warns her of what might come of marrying a soldier - "Oh, barbarous! to want a husband that may wed you to-day, and be sent the Lord knows where before night; then in a twelvemonth perhaps to have him come like a Colossus, with one leg at New York, and the other at Chelsea Hospital". She softens, however, when Lauretta says she "heard him say you were the best natured and best looking woman in the world". The Justice comes in to tell then that he has hired a new servant to help protect his daughter from the Lieutenant's importunities, and the audience witnesses a highly edifying conversation between the three parties, exemplary of the usual domestic turmoil in the Justice's house.

Attired as a common rustic, O'Connor is introduced by Dr Rosy as "Honest Humphrey Hum", of a naive and bashful temperament. He is soon entrusted with Lauretta, to mind her while she walks in the garden, with especial instructions to keep her safe from the soldiers. As soon as they are alone, O'Connor tells her who he is, and the Justice returns a few minutes later to find him kissing her. Discovering his true identity in his anger, he dismisses him angrily and threatens to shoot him should he return. Returning to Dr Rosy in despair, he soon comes up with another plan and, disguised as a German quack, sends a missive to the Judge informing him that he has been poisoned. In terror Credulous sends for Dr Rosy, who affirms that he has been poisoned, "how came these black spots on your nose?...alack, how you are swelled". He tells him that the only hope lies in consulting the German, and O'Connor is accordingly sent for. When he arrives, he informs Justice Credulous that he has an antidote, but that he will give it to him only on the payment of three thousand pounds, and permission to marry his daughter if he can get her consent. Trusting that Lauretta will never give the latter, Credulous agrees, only to find too late that he has been at last outwitted. The play ends happily, with Justice Credulous withdrawing his objection :"I give my daughter to you, who are the most impudent dog I ever saw in my life", and that the affair will provide he and his wife "a good subject for [them] to quarrel about the rest of [their] lives".
