= Memoirs of a Magdalen =

1767 novel by Hugh Kelly

The Memoirs of a Magdalen
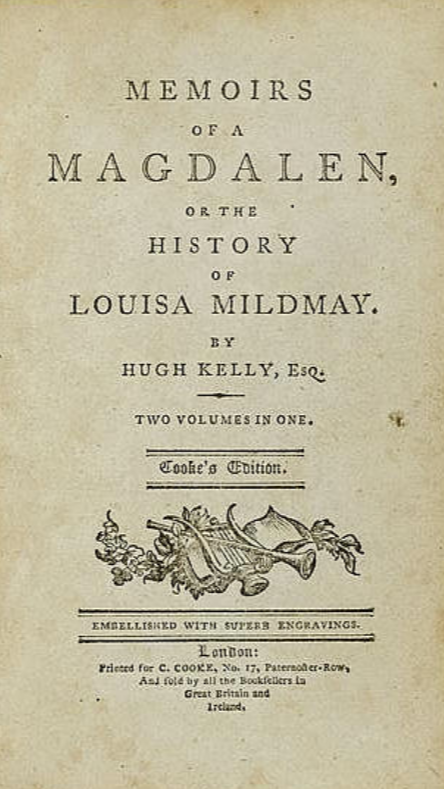
- Title page for Magdalen, or the History of Louisa Mildmay (1795 edition)
- Author: Hugh Kelly
- Language: English
- Genre: Drama
- Publisher: William Griffin
- Publication date: 31 March 1767
- Publication place: Great Britain
- Media type: Print

Memoirs of a Magdalen is a 1767 British novel by the Irish writer Hugh Kelly. Its full title is Memoirs of a Magdalen, or the History of Louisa Mildmay.

Kelly began writing the story in 1766 and it was published in London by William Griffin on 31 March 1767. It was one of Kelly's first published works, other than newspaper articles, and was a major success. A separate edition was printed in Dublin and a further two English-language versions were published by the end of the century with two French translations also published. A review in the Monthly Review described it as a "pretty imitation" of Samuel Richardson's Clarissa. In 1767 a play The Widowed Wife by William Kenrick appeared at Drury Lane Theatre which bore close resemblance to the plot of Kelly's novel.

The novel was dedicated to the Duchess of Northumberland, one of Kelly's patrons. The novel includes several references to Richardson's Clarissa, and at one point in the story the heroine is described reading Clarissa.

== Synopsis ==
The rakish Sir Robert Harold is engaged to be married to Louisa Mildmay. While staying at her parents' house before the marriage Sir Robert seduces Louisa. Then, deciding she is too amorous to make a good wife, he breaks off the marriage. After fighting a duel with Louisa's brother, Colonel Mildmay, Sir Robert flees to the Continent. The disgraced Louisa is sent to London by her parents, where she is kidnapped by another rake Sir Harry Hastings. She eventually manages to escape and takes shelter in the London Magdelan House for reformed prostitutes. After hearing of Louisa's fate, Sir Robert returns from Europe and fights Hastings in a duel, badly wounding him. Filled with remorse he then again offers to marry Louisa, and they settle down happily together.

== Bibliography ==
- Bataille, Robert R. The Writing Life of Hugh Kelly: Politics, Journalism and Theater in Late-Eighteenth Century London. Southern Illinois University Press, 2000.
