= James Townley =

English dramatist

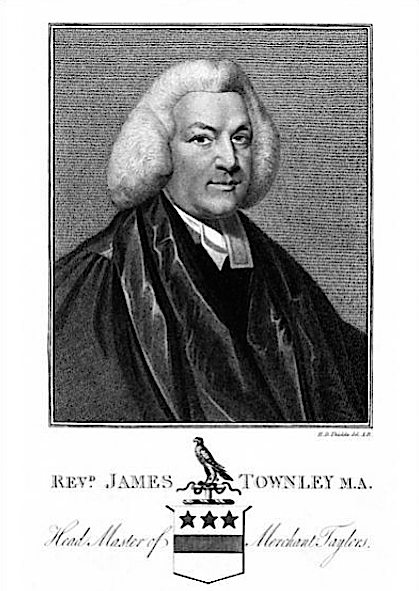
- Born: 6 May 1714
- Died: 15 July 1778 (aged 64)
- Children: 5 daughters and 3 sons

Rev. James Townley (6 May 1714 – 15 July 1778) was an English dramatist, the second son of Charles Townley, a merchant.

== Early life, education and marriage ==
Townley was born in 1714 probably at Tower Hill, London, the second son of Charles Townley, of Clapham, Surrey and Sarah Wilde, daughter of William Wilde of Long-Whatton in Leicestershire. His mother died shortly after his birth. His elder brother was the officer of arms Sir Charles Townley. Following his mother's death, his father remarried and had many more children. Townley was a descendant of a younger branch of the Town(e)ley family of Towneley Hall, Burnley, Lancashire, the head of which at this time was the antiquary Charles Towneley.

He was educated at Merchant Taylors' School, London, and at St John's College, Oxford.

Around 1740, James married Jane, the daughter of Peter Bonnin of Lisbon, and they went on to have eight children: Charles, a noted engraver, James, George-Stephen, Jane, Sarah, Catherine, Mary and Elizabeth.

== Career ==
He took holy orders and was ordained an Anglican priest on 28 May 1738. He was lecturer at St. Dunstan's in the East, chaplain to the lord mayor, then under-master at Merchant Taylors' School until 1753, when he became grammar master at Christ's Hospital. In 1760, he became head master of Merchant Taylors' School, where in 1762 and 1763 he revived the custom of dramatic performances. He retained his headmastership until his death on 5 July 1778.

He was a friend and collaborator of William Hogarth and verses by him accompanied the artist's prints Beer Street and Gin Lane and The Four Stages of Cruelty. He assisted in Hogarth in his The Analysis of Beauty and was depicted in Paul Sandby's satirical prints – "Puggs Graces etched from his original daubing" and 'The Analyst Besh-n in his own Taste'.

He had taken a keen interest in the theatre, and it has been asserted that many of David Garrick's best productions and revivals owed much to his assistance. He was the author, although the fact was long concealed, of High Life Below Stairs, a two-act farce presented at Drury Lane on 31 October 1759; also of False Concord (Covent Garden, 20 March 1764) and The Tutor (Drury Lane, 4 February 1765).
