= The Good-Natur'd Man =

1768 play

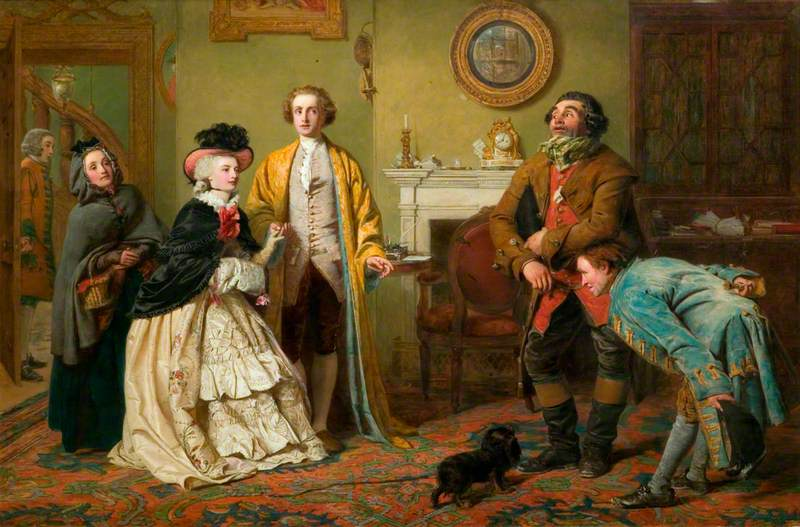
- Mr Honeywood Introduces the Bailiffs to Miss Richland as His Friends by William Powell Frith, 1850
- Original language: English
- Written by: Oliver Goldsmith
- Genre: Comedy
- Setting: London, present day

Premiere
- Date: 29 January 1768
- Place: Theatre Royal, Covent Garden, London

The Good-Natur'd Man is a 1768 comedy play written by the Irish author Oliver Goldsmith. It premiered at the Theatre Royal, Covent Garden on 29 January 1768. The original cast included Mary Bulkley as Miss Richland, Isabella Mattocks as Olivia, Ann Pitt as Mrs Croaker, Jane Green as Garnet, William Powell as Mr Honeywood, Edward Shuter as Croaker, Henry Woodward as Lofty, Matthew Clarke as Sir William Honeywood, Robert Bensley as Leontine, John Dunstall as Jarvis, John Cushing as Butler and John Quick as Potboy. The prologue was written by Samuel Johnson.

It was a middling success for Goldsmith, and the printed version of the play became popular with the reading public. It was released at the same time as Hugh Kelly's False Delicacy, staged at Drury Lane Theatre. The two plays went head to head, with Kelly's proving the more popular. Garrick rejected The Good-Natur'd Man, possibly because the story is an antidote of False Delicacy.

In 1850 William Powell Frith produced a painting Mr Honeywood Introduces the Bailiffs to Miss Richland as His Friends based on the play which he displayed at the Royal Academy Exhibition of 1850 and the Paris Salon of 1855.

== Bibliography ==
- Sherburne, George and Bond, Donald F. A Literary History of England, Volume III: The Restoration and Eighteenth Century. Routledge and Kegan Paul, 1967.
- Thomson, Peter. The Cambridge Introduction to English Theatre, 1660-1900. Cambridge University Press, 2006.
