= Thomas Mozeen =

English actor and dramatist

- Born: England
- Died: 1768
- Occupations: Actor and dramatist

Thomas Mozeen (died 1768) was an English actor and dramatist.

== Biography ==
Mozeen was of French extraction, but born in England, his sponsor being Dr. Henry Sacheverell, was bred to the bar, which profession he forsook for the stage. His first traceable appearance is at Drury Lane, 20 Feb. 1745, as Pembroke in ' King John.' He played apparently the customary three years' engagement, but his name only appears to Clitander in Swiney's ' Quacks, or Love's the Physician,' 30 March 1745; Young Laroon in Fielding's 'Debauchees, or the Jesuit Caught,' 17 October 1745; Charles in the 'Nonjuror,' 22 October 1745; and Basil in the 'Stage Coach' of Farquhar and Motteux.

On 30 September 1746 the part of Polly in the 'Beggar's Opera' was played by Mrs. Mozeen, late Miss Edwards. As Miss Edwards she was first heard at Drury Lane, when for the benefit of Mrs. Catherine Clive, whose pupil she was, she sang, 8 March 1743, the part of Sabrina in 'Comus.' On 13 March 1744, also for Mrs. Olive's benefit, she made, as Jessica, her first appearance at Covent Garden. At Drury Lane she played Polly in the 'Beggar's Opera,' 3 December 1745, and was Miranda in the 'Tempest,' 31 January 1746.

In 1748–9, the Mozeens were engaged by Sheridan for Dublin as part of a musical company, concerning which it is said by Victor that 'their salaries amounted to 1,400l., but the profit accruing from their performances did not amount to 150l., which was paid for the writing of their music.' Chetwood asserts that Mozeen had a good person, a genteel education, judgment, voice and understanding, and was an actor of promise. The timidity of Mrs. Mozeen, who was an adept in music, and had a charming manner and voice, kept her back as an actress. Of her Tate Wilkinson says that 'at the least loose joke she blushed to such a degree as to give the beholder pain for an offence not intended.' This bashfulness was accompanied by no very keen scruples as to her conduct, which was irregular enough to induce Mrs. Clive to withdraw her support. What parts were played in Dublin is unrecorded, but Victor, as manager for Sheridan, was fortunate enough to transfer to a musical society a portion of the engagement. On 15 Sept. 1750, as Young Fashion in the 'Relapse,' Mozeen reappeared at Drury Lane. He played Benvolio in 'Romeo and Juliet,' Worthy in the 'Recruiting Officer,' and Cob in 'Every Man in his Humour.'

On 21 May 1759, for the benefit of Mozeen, Miss Barton, Miss Hippisley, and others, the 'Heiress, or Antigallican,' the solitary dramatic production of Mozeen, was given. It is a fairly written farce in two acts, in which a girl who has been brought up as a boy wins the heart of one of her own sex. It was included in a volume published for the author 1762, wholly in verse, with the exception of the play, and called 'A Collection of Miscellaneous Essays by T. Mozeen.' Among its contents are many songs, epilogues, &c., delivered in Bristol and elsewhere, and at Sadler's Wells Theatre, and the introductory plan of a pantomime called 'Harlequin Deserter,' intended for Sadler's Wells. 'Frolics of May,' an interlude of singing and dancing, seems also to have been intended for the stage. 'Fables in Verse,' by T. Mozeen, 2 vols. 1765, dedicated to Richard Grenville Temple, viscount Cobham, possesses little merit. 'The Lyrical Pacquet, containing most of the Favourite Songs performed for Three Seasons past at Sadler's Wells,' &c., London, 1764, 8vo, is mentioned by Lowndes, who, however, leaves unnoticed 'Young Scarron,' London, 8vo, 1752, a rather slavish imitation of 'Le Roman Comique' of Scarron, narrating the adventures of a company of strolling players. Owen Bray, a publican, with whom he lodged at Loughlinstown, Ireland, was associated with Mozeen (to whom the well-known recitation, 'Bucks have at ye all,' has also been assigned) in writing the famous song of 'Kilruddery.' Mozeen died 28 March 1768. Mrs. Mozeen, whose career appears after a time independent of that of her husband, was for some years at the Bath Theatre.
