= Mary Bradshaw =

British stage actress (died 1780)

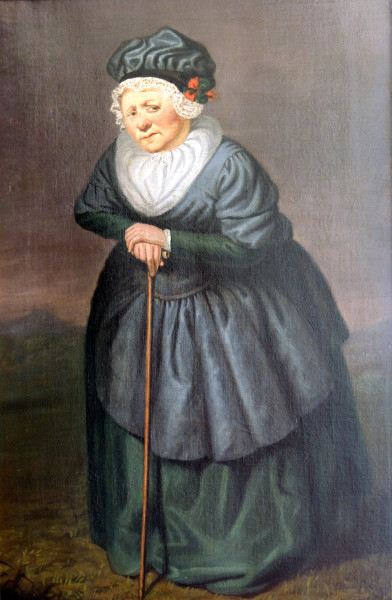
- by Thomas Parkinson
- Died: 1780; Plymouth
- Occupation: actress
- Employer: Drury Lane
- Spouse: William Bradshaw
- Children: Elizabeth

Mary Bradshaw (died 1780) was a British stage actress at Theatre Royal, Drury Lane for 37 years. She appeared with David Garrick and she was included in a painting by Johann Zoffany.

== Life ==
Bradshaw comes to notice playing young women. She joined the Drury Lane company in 1743/1744 and would remain there for 37 years.

In 1760 she was the first person to play the nurse in Polly Honeycombe and this became "her part" appearing in that role when it was put on. By this point she had moved successfully to take the role of older women like the nurse.

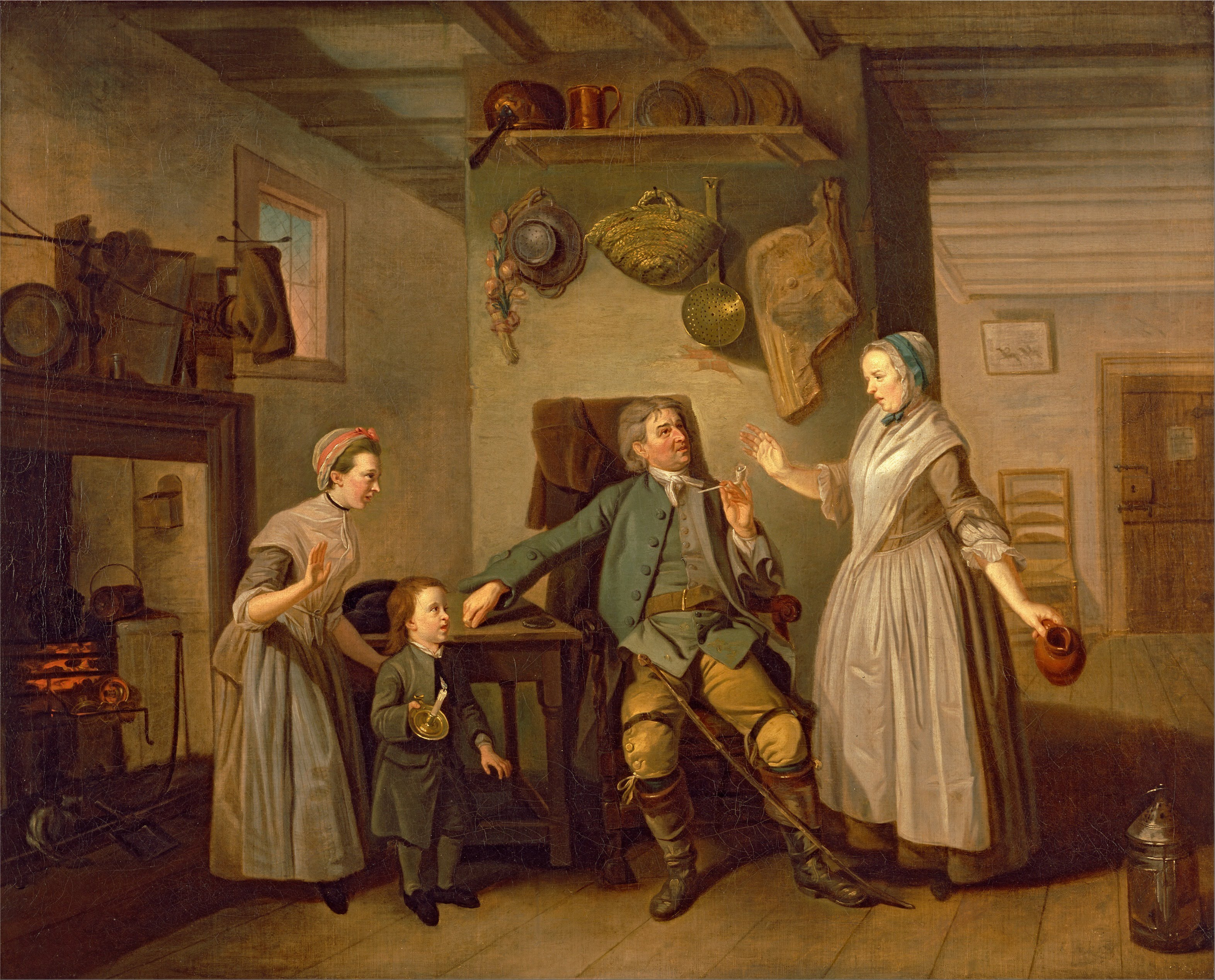
David Garrick and Mary Bradshaw in David Garrick's "The Farmer's Return" by Johan Joseph Zoffany

She appeared with David Garrick in the Farmer's Wife and she and Garrick appeared in Zoffany's painting. Samuel De Wilde reproduced a portrait of Bradshaw by extracting the figure from Zoffany's painting. De Wilde's portrait is in the National Portrait Gallery.

In 1767, she appeared as Dorcas, a deaf woman in her seventies who arrives on stage in David Garrick's Cymon to sing of her age. She was painted in this role by Thomas Parkinson and this painting is owned by the Garrick Club.

Bradshaw died in Plymouth in 1780 after her daughter, Elizabeth, was booed off the stage.
