= Cymon =

1767 opera by Michael Arne

Cymon is a five-act opera composed by Michael Arne, with a libretto by David Garrick.

Cymon and Iphigenia is a novella taken from Boccaccio's Decamerone (day five, first tale) and developed later by the poet and dramatist John Dryden. Cymon tells the story of a captive prince who falls in love with a shepherdess named Sylvia. The prince's captor, Urganda, threatens to punish Sylvia, but Merlin the magician frustrates her plans, allowing the lovers to unite.

Cymon was first performed at the Theatre Royal, Drury Lane, London, on 2 January 1767. A subsequent 64 performances, in seven seasons, made it Michael Arne's biggest success.
