= John Moody (actor) =

Irish actor

John Moody (1727?–1812), original name John Cochran, was an Irish actor.

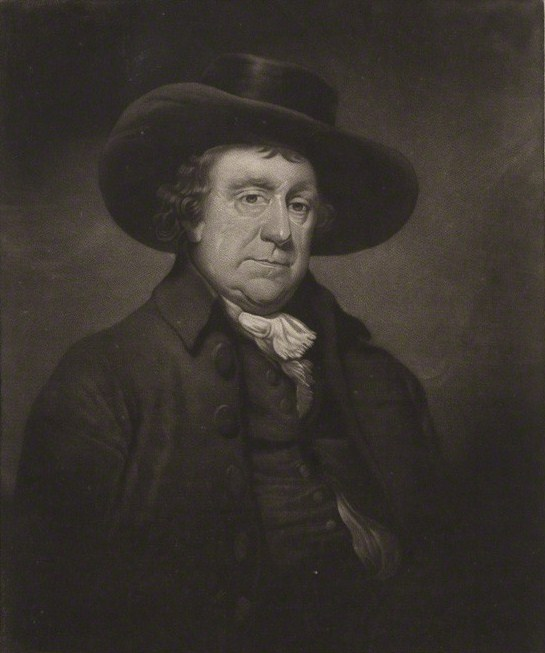
John Moody, 1792 engraving

== Life ==
The son of a hairdresser named Cochran, he was born in Cork and followed his father's occupation; his own account was that he was born in Stanhope Street, Clare Market, London. To the end of his life he claimed to be a Londoner. Perhaps to avoid being a forced recruit at the time of the Jacobite rising of 1745, he went to Jamaica.

Returning to England as Moody, with some property and acting experience, he went on the Norwich circuit. He took the lead in both tragedy and comedy. Tate Wilkinson claimed to have been, 20 June 1759, at Portsmouth, Lord Townley in The Provoked Husband (John Vanburgh and Colley Cibber) to Moody's Manly, with Moody having just arrived from Jamaica.

== The London stage ==
Hired by David Garrick for Drury Lane, on 31 October 1759 Moody was the original Kingston in High Life Below Stairs, and on 12 February 1760 created his major character of Sir Callaghan O'Brallaghan in Charles Macklin's Love à la Mode.

With one season at the Haymarket Theatre, and occasional visits to the country, Moody remained at Drury Lane until the end of his theatrical career. In the season of 1760–1, he tried Teague in The Committee (Sir Robert Howard), one of his great parts. As the Irishman in The Jubilee (Garrick), and on 19 January 1771 as Major O'Flaherty in The West Indian, he was becoming typecast as a stage Irishman. He played a Scottish servant, Colin MacLeod, in The Fashionable Lover, 20 January 1772, but he resumed his Irish types as Sir Patrick O'Neale in The Irish Widow, 23 October 1772, and O'Flam in Samuel Foote's The Bankrupt, in which, 21 July 1773, he appeared at the Haymarket.

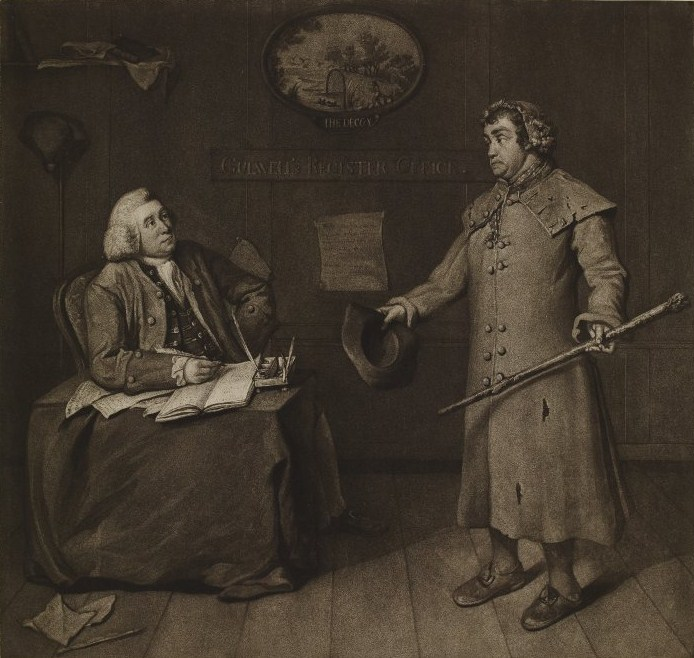
John Moody (left) and John Hayman Packer (right) in The Register Office by Joseph Reed, 1773 engraving

In Liverpool, where Moody acted during the summer, and in other country towns, he tried more ambitious parts, as the King in First Part of King Henry IV, Iago, and Shylock.

== Later years ==
After the season of 1795–6 the management, faced with Moody's spiritless performances, did not engage him, and he went into retirement. He emerged to play at Covent Garden, for the benefit of the Bayswater Hospital, 26 June 1804, Jobson in the Devil to Pay.

Moody retired to Barnes Common, as a market gardener. He died 26 December 1812, at Shepherd's Bush (according to the Gentleman's Magazine), or in Leicester Square (according to the European Magazine). He wished be buried in St. Clement's burial-ground, Portugal Street, Lincoln's Inn Fields, and that the headstone should bear the words, "A native of this parish, and an old member of Drury Lane Theatre;" but the cemetery was full, and his remains were interred in the churchyard at Barnes, near those of his first wife, who died 12 May 1805, aged 88. His widow, Kitty Ann Moody, died 29 October 1846, aged 83.

== Notes ==
Attribution

This article incorporates text from a publication now in the public domain: Lee, Sidney, ed. (1894). "Moody, John". Dictionary of National Biography. Vol. 38. London: Smith, Elder & Co.
