= John Home =

Scottish minister, soldier and author

John Home FRSE
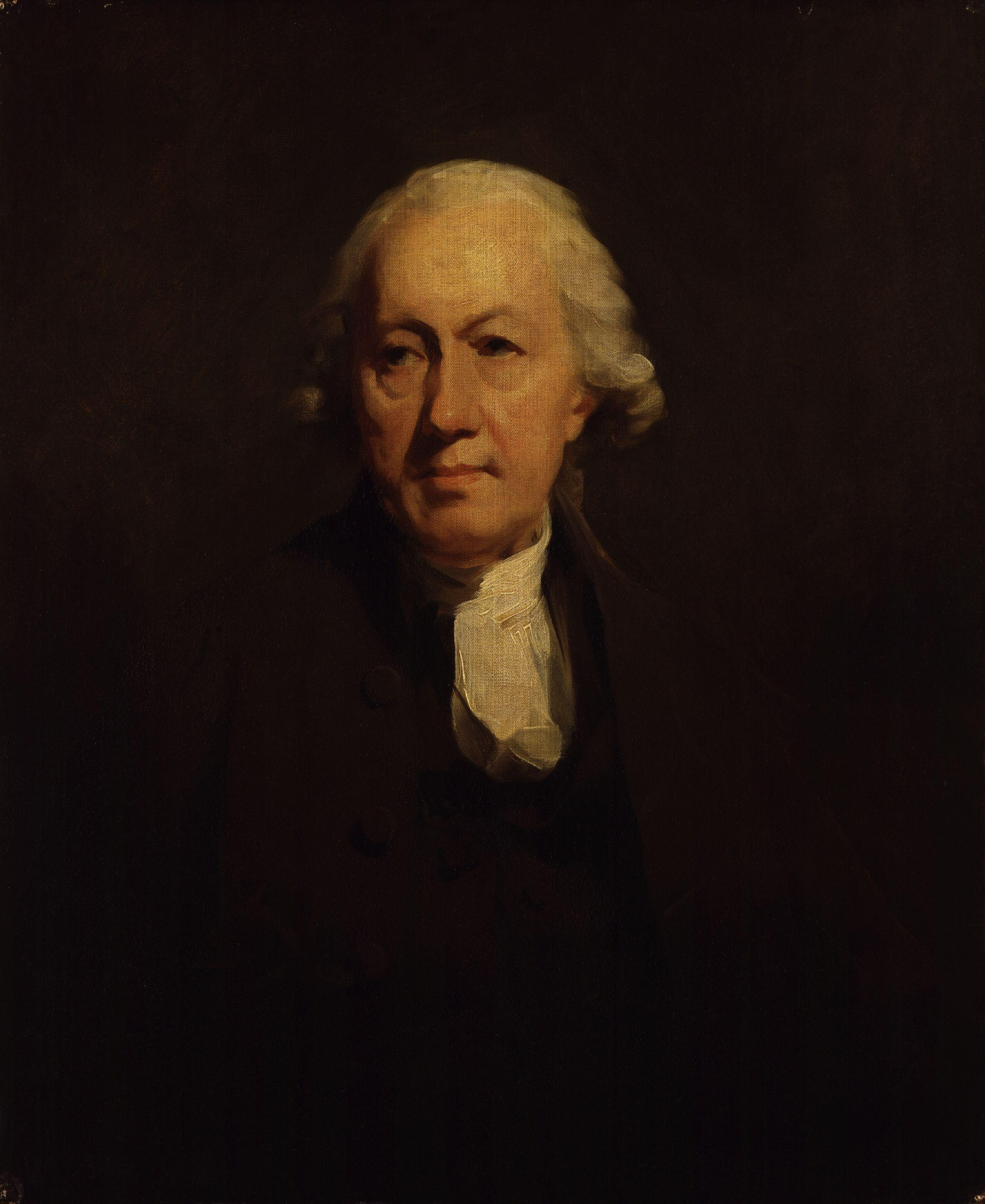
- Portrait, oil on canvas, of John Home by Henry Raeburn, c. 1795–1800
- Born: 2 September 1722; Leith near Edinburgh, Scotland
- Died: 4 September 1808 (aged 86); Merchiston Bank near Edinburgh, Scotland
- Education: Leith Grammar School
- Alma mater: University of Edinburgh
- Writing career
- Genre: Playwright
- Notable work: Douglas

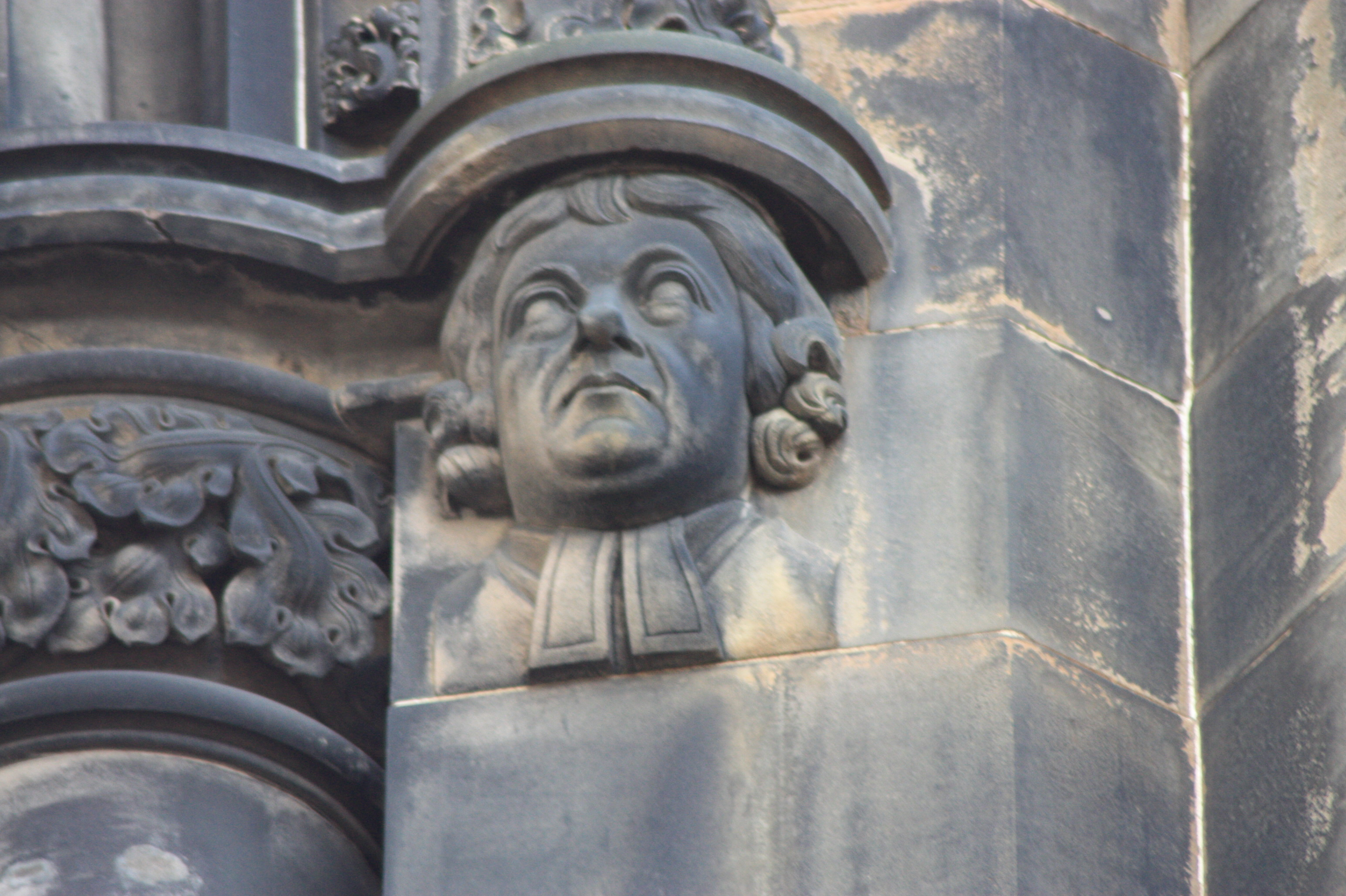
John Home as depicted on the Scott Monument

Rev John Home FRSE (2 September 1722 – 4 September 1808) was a Scottish minister, soldier and author. His play Douglas was a standard Scottish school text until the Second World War, but his work is now largely neglected. In 1783, he was one of the joint founders of the Royal Society of Edinburgh.

== Biography ==
He was born on 2 September 1722 in Leith near Edinburgh, and christened on 3 September 1722. His father, Alexander Home, a distant relation of the earls of Home, was town clerk. His mother was Christian Hay, the daughter of an Edinburgh lawyer.

John was educated at the Leith Grammar School, and at the University of Edinburgh, where he graduated MA in 1742. Though interested in being a soldier, he studied divinity, and was licensed to preach by the presbytery of Edinburgh in 1745. In the same year he joined as a volunteer against Bonnie Prince Charlie, and was taken prisoner at the Battle of Falkirk. With many others he was carried to Doune Castle in Perthshire, but soon escaped, reaching Alloa on foot, from where they got passage on the sloop-of-war Vulture to Queensferry. From there he reached his father's house in Leith.

In July 1746, Home was presented to the parish of Athelstaneford in East Lothian, which had been left vacant by the death of Robert Blair. In his spare time he visited his friends in Edinburgh and became especially close to David Hume who was a distant cousin. Other friends included Adam Smith, Adam Fergusson and William Robertson.

Home's first play, Agis, founded on Plutarch's narrative, was completed in 1747. He took it to London, England, and submitted it to David Garrick for representation at Drury Lane, but it was rejected as unsuitable for the stage. The tragedy of Douglas was suggested to him by hearing a lady sing the ballad of Gil Morrice or Child Maurice (Francis James Child, Popular Ballads, ii. 263). The ballad supplied him with the outline of a simple and striking plot.

After five years, he completed his play and took it to London for Garrick's opinion. It was rejected, but on his return to Edinburgh his friends resolved that it should be produced there. It was performed on 14 December 1756 with overwhelming success, in spite of the opposition of the presbytery, who summoned Alexander Carlyle to answer for having attended its representation. Home resigned his charge in 1757, after a visit to London, where Douglas was brought out at Covent Garden on 14 March. Peg Woffington played Lady Randolph, a part which found a later exponent in Sarah Siddons. Hume summed up his admiration for Douglas by saying that his friend possessed "the true theatric genius of Shakespeare and Otway, refined from the unhappy barbarism of the one and licentiousness of the other." Gray, writing to Horace Walpole (August 1757), said that the author "seemed to have retrieved the true language of the stage, which has been lost for these hundred years," but Samuel Johnson held aloof from the general enthusiasm, and averred that there were not ten good lines in the whole play.

In 1758, Home became private secretary to Lord Bute, then secretary of state, and was appointed tutor to the prince of Wales; and in 1760 his patron's influence procured him a pension of £300 per annum and in 1763 a sinecure worth another £500. Garrick produced Agis at Drury Lane on 21 February 1758. By dint of good acting and powerful support, according to Genest, the play lasted for eleven days, but it was lamentably inferior to Douglas. In 1760 his tragedy, The Siege of Aquileia, was put on the stage, Garrick taking the part of Aemilius. In 1769 another tragedy, The Fatal Discovery ran for nine nights; Alonzo (1773) also had fair success; but his last tragedy, Alfred (1778), was so coolly received that he gave up writing for the stage.

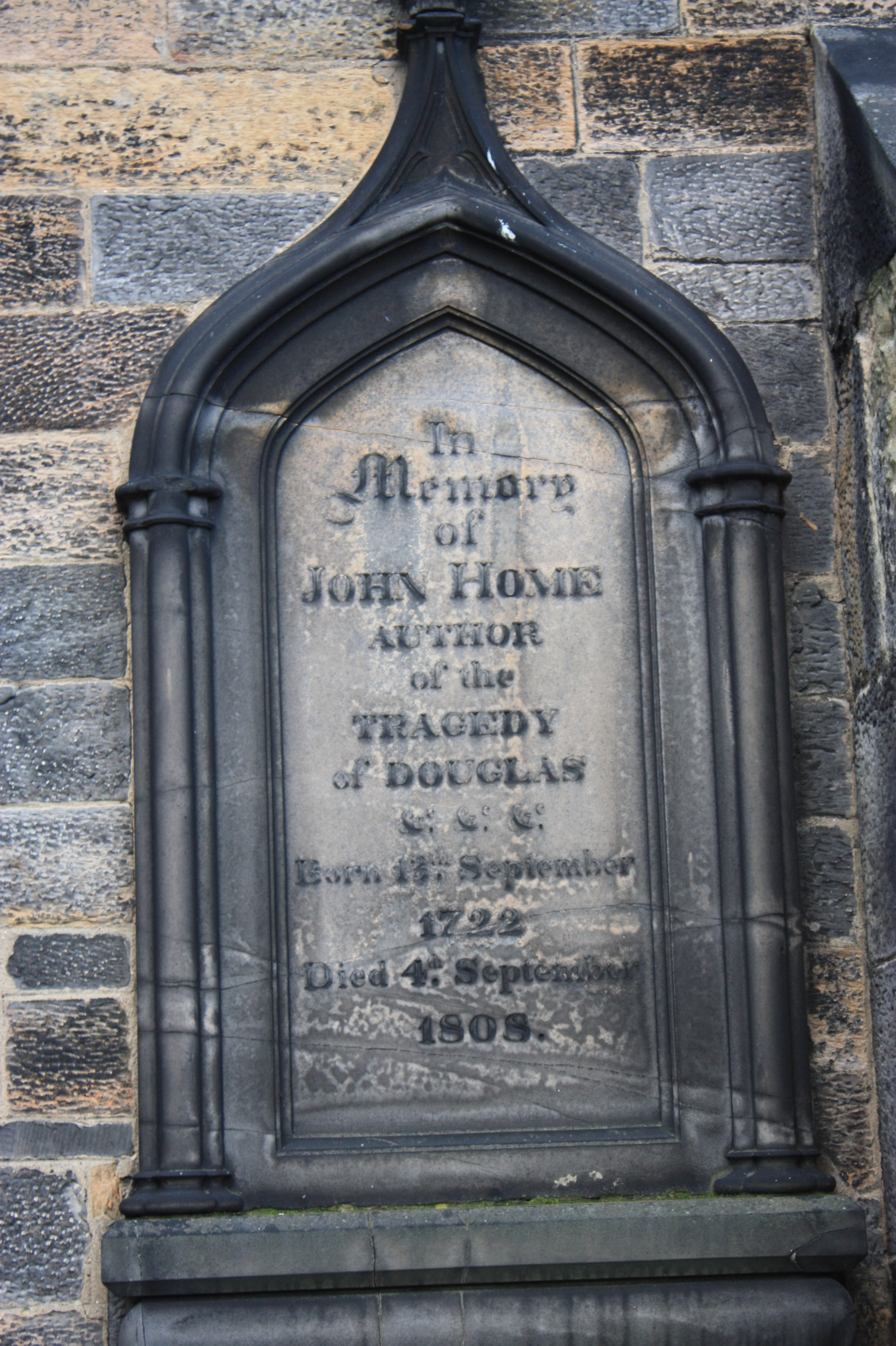
John Home's grave South Leith Parish Church

Home was also an active participant in the social life of Edinburgh, and joined the Poker Club in 1762.

In May 1763 he succeeded George Lind as MP for Edinburgh.

On 15 July 1770, he married Mary Home (died 1816) his second cousin, once removed. Mary was the daughter of the Reverend William Home (c. 1706–1784), minister of firstly Polwarth, then secondly Fogo. They had no children.

In 1778, he joined a regiment formed by the Duke of Buccleuch. He sustained severe injuries in a fall from horseback which permanently affected his brain, and was persuaded by his friends to retire. From 1767, he resided either at Edinburgh or at a villa which he built at Kilduff near his former parish. It was at this time that he wrote his History of the Rebellion of 1745, which appeared in 1802.

Home died at Merchiston Bank, near Edinburgh, in his eighty-sixth year, on 4 September. He was buried on 5 September in South Leith Parish Church.

== Works ==
The Works of John Home were collected and published by Henry Mackenzie in 1822 with "An Account of the Life and Writings of Mr John Home," which also appeared separately in the same year, but several of his smaller poems seem to have escaped the editor's observation. These are: "The Fate of Caesar", "Verses upon Inveraray", "Epistle to the Earl of Eglintoun", "Prologue on the Birthday of the Prince of Wales, 1759" and several "Epigrams", which are printed in vol. ii. of Original Poems by Scottish Gentlemen (1762). See also W Scott, "The Life and Works of John Home" in the Quarterly Review (June 1827). Douglas is included in numerous collections of British drama. Voltaire published his Le Gaffe, ou l'Ecossaise (1760), Londres (really Geneva), as a translation from the work of Hume, described as pasteur de l'église d'Edimbourg, but Home seems to have taken no notice of the mystification.

== Memorials ==
Home is amongst the sixteen writers and poets depicted on the lower capital heads of the Scott Monument on Princes Street in Edinburgh. He appears at the far right side on the east face.

A small bronze plaque stands near the site of his home on Maritime Street in Leith. His house was demolished in the 1950s and now holds a modern housing development (Bell's Court).
