= James William Dodd =

English actor

James William Dodd (1740?–1796) was an English actor, one of David Garrick's picked company.

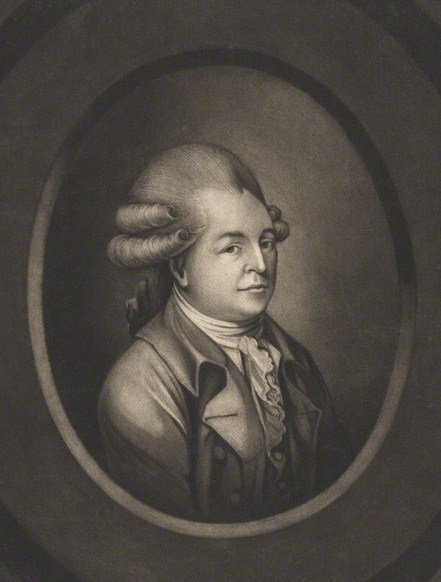
James William Dodd, 1779 engraving by Robert Laurie after Robert Dighton

== Early life ==
Born in London about 1740, he is said to have been the son of a hairdresser. He was educated at the grammar school in Holborn. A success in a school performance of the Andria of Terence decided him to become an actor.

Aged 16, Dodd is said to have appeared at Sheffield as Roderigo in Othello. He was met by Tate Wilkinson in Norwich in 1763. He then played in comedy and tragedy, and was popular, according to Wilkinson. An engagement in Bath, Somerset followed, and proved a stepping-stone to London.

== At Drury Lane ==
John Hoadly saw Dodd in The Jealous Wife and recommended him to David Garrick, who decided with James Lacy to engage him for Drury Lane Theatre. Dodd's first appearance at Drury Lane took place 3 October 1765 as Faddle in Edward Moore's comedy, The Foundling. For 31 years, Dodd remained there. During this long period he played mainly beaux and coxcombs, regarded as a successor in that to Colley Cibber. He played also in low comedy, sang occasionally, and for benefits took on some serious characters, appearing on one occasion as Richard III. Among characters of which Dodd was the first exponent were Sir Benjamin Backbite in The School for Scandal, Dangle in The Critic, Lord Foppington in A Trip to Scarborough, and Adam Winterton in The Iron Chest. The Iron Chest was a failure; George Colman the Younger, the author, laid the blame on John Philip Kemble, who played Sir Edward Mortimer. The public, however, hissed Dodd, whose part was tedious.

== Last years ==
Dodd after the close of the season 1795–6 acted no more. His last appearance was as Kecksey in the ‘Irish Widow’ of Garrick, 13 June 1796. He died in the following September. Dodd left at his death a collection of books, largely dramatic, which formed a nine days' sale at Sotheby's, and realised large prices. He also collected the weapons of the North American Indians.

== Personal life ==
Mrs. Martha Dodd, who was acting with Dodd in the Beggar's Opera as Polly to his Macheath, was also engaged at Drury Lane. On 29 January 1766 she played Lady Lurewell in the Constant Couple. She died in October 1769. Dodd had a son James (d. 1820), who was a clergyman, and was usher at Westminster School.

Dodd's relationship with Mary Bulkley extended over many years, and ended in a separation and a scandal. James Boaden's Life of Elizabeth Inchbald suggests Dodd behaved badly to her. She was the unmarried Elizabeth Simpson when he tried to seduce her: she threw hot water over him.

== Notes ==
Attribution

This article incorporates text from a publication now in the public domain: Stephen, Leslie, ed. (1888). "Dodd, James William". Dictionary of National Biography. Vol. 15. London: Smith, Elder & Co.
