= The Countess of Salisbury (play) =

1767 play by Hall Hartson

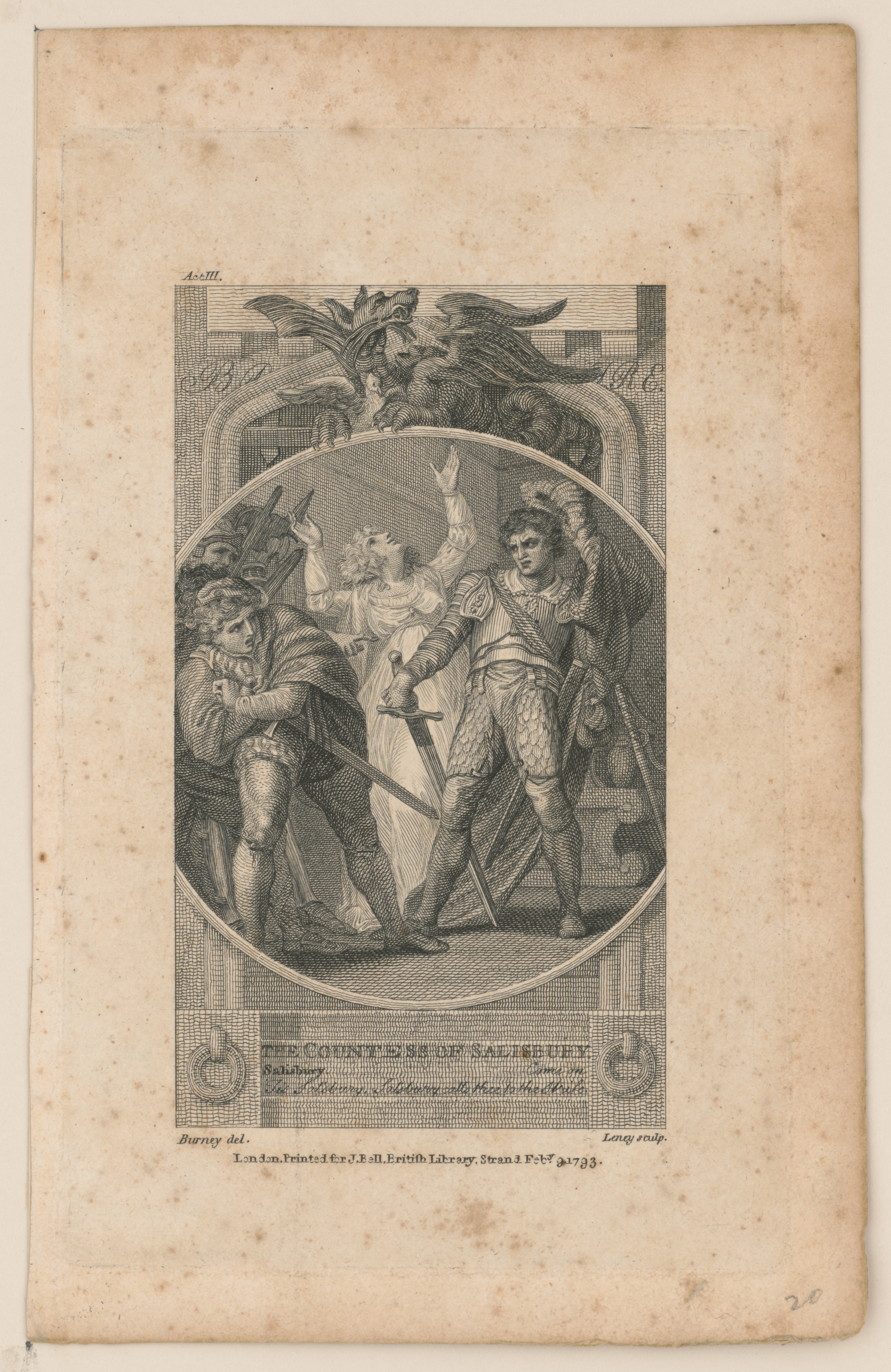
- Original language: English
- Written by: Hall Hartson
- Genre: Tragedy

Premiere
- Date: 21 August 1767
- Place: Haymarket Theatre, London

The Countess of Salisbury is a 1767 tragedy by Hall Hartson. It is inspired by the 1762 novel Longsword by Irish writer Thomas Leland, who had been Hartson's tutor. It is based on the life of William Longespée, 3rd Earl of Salisbury, son of Henry II of England, and his wife Ela of Salisbury, 3rd Countess of Salisbury.

The original Haymarket cast included Spranger Barry as Alwin, Thomas Barry as Raymond, Ann Dancer as Countess, John Sowdon as Grey, John Palmer as Morton and John Bannister as Sir Ardolf.

== Bibliography ==
- Baines, Paul & Ferarro, Julian & Rogers, Pat. The Wiley-Blackwell Encyclopedia of Eighteenth-Century Writers and Writing, 1660-1789. Wiley-Blackwell, 2011.
- Watson, George. The New Cambridge Bibliography of English Literature: Volume 2, 1660-1800. Cambridge University Press, 1971.
