= Frances Abington =

English actress (1737–1815)

Fanny Abington
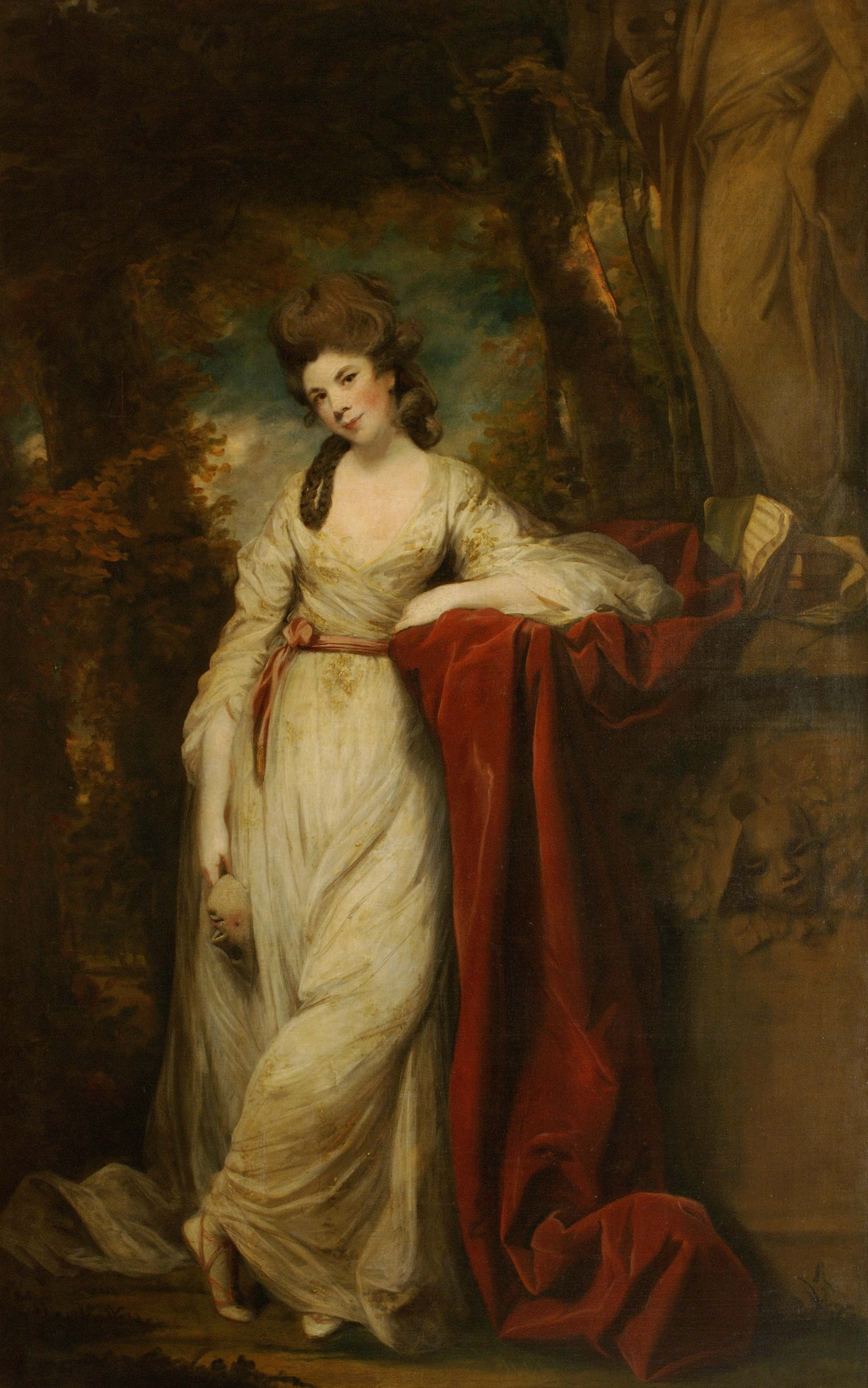
- Portrait by Joshua Reynolds
- Born: Frances Barton; 1737; London, England
- Died: 4 March 1815; London, England
- Other name: Nosegay Fan
- Occupations: actress,singer
- Employer(s): Haymarket Theatre, Drury Lane, Covent Garden
- Notable work: Lady Teazle in The School for Scandal
- Spouse: James Abington

Frances "Fanny" Abington (née Barton; 1737 – 4 March 1815) was an English actress who was also known for her sense of fashion. Writer and politician Horace Walpole described her as one of the finest actors of their time, and Richard Brinsley Sheridan was said to have written the part of Lady Teazle in The School for Scandal for her to perform.

== Early life ==
She was born Frances Barton (nicknamed "Fanny"), as the daughter of a private soldier. She began her career as a flower girl and a street singer. It was also rumoured that she recited Shakespeare in taverns at the age of 12, along with being a prostitute for a short period to help her family with financial problems. Later, she became a servant to a French milliner. During that time, she learnt about costume and learnt French. Her early nickname, Nosegay Fan, came from her time as a flower girl.

== Career ==
Her first appearance on stage was at Haymarket in 1755 as Miranda in Mrs Centlivre's play, Busybody. She rose to become a principal actor in October 1756 when she was cast as Lady Pliant in The Double Dealerat the Drury Lane. The play's cast also included the stars Hannah Pritchard and Kitty Clive. She also appeared in Ireland, where her Lady Townley (in The Provoked Husband by Vanbrugh and Cibber) was a success. David Garrick convinced her to return to Drury Lane, and they worked together there until his retirement in 1776.

From 1759 onwards she appeared in the bills as "Mrs Abington", following her marriage to her music tutor, the royal trumpeter James Abington. They separated shortly after their marriage as he could not cope with her popularity. They lived separately, with Fanny paying James a small annual stipend to stay away from her. She subsequently had affairs with an Irish MP, Needham, who left her a considerable estate, and William Petty, 2nd Earl of Shelburne. The income from her estate and her stage work made her a wealthy woman.

She remained at the Drury Lane for 18 years, being the first to play more than 30 important characters, notably Lady Teazle (1777) in The School for Scandal.

In April 1772, when James Northcote saw her as Miss Notable in Cibber's The Lady's Last Stake, he remarked to his brother

I never saw a part done so excellent in all my life, for in her acting she has all the simplicity of nature and not the least tincture of the theatrical.

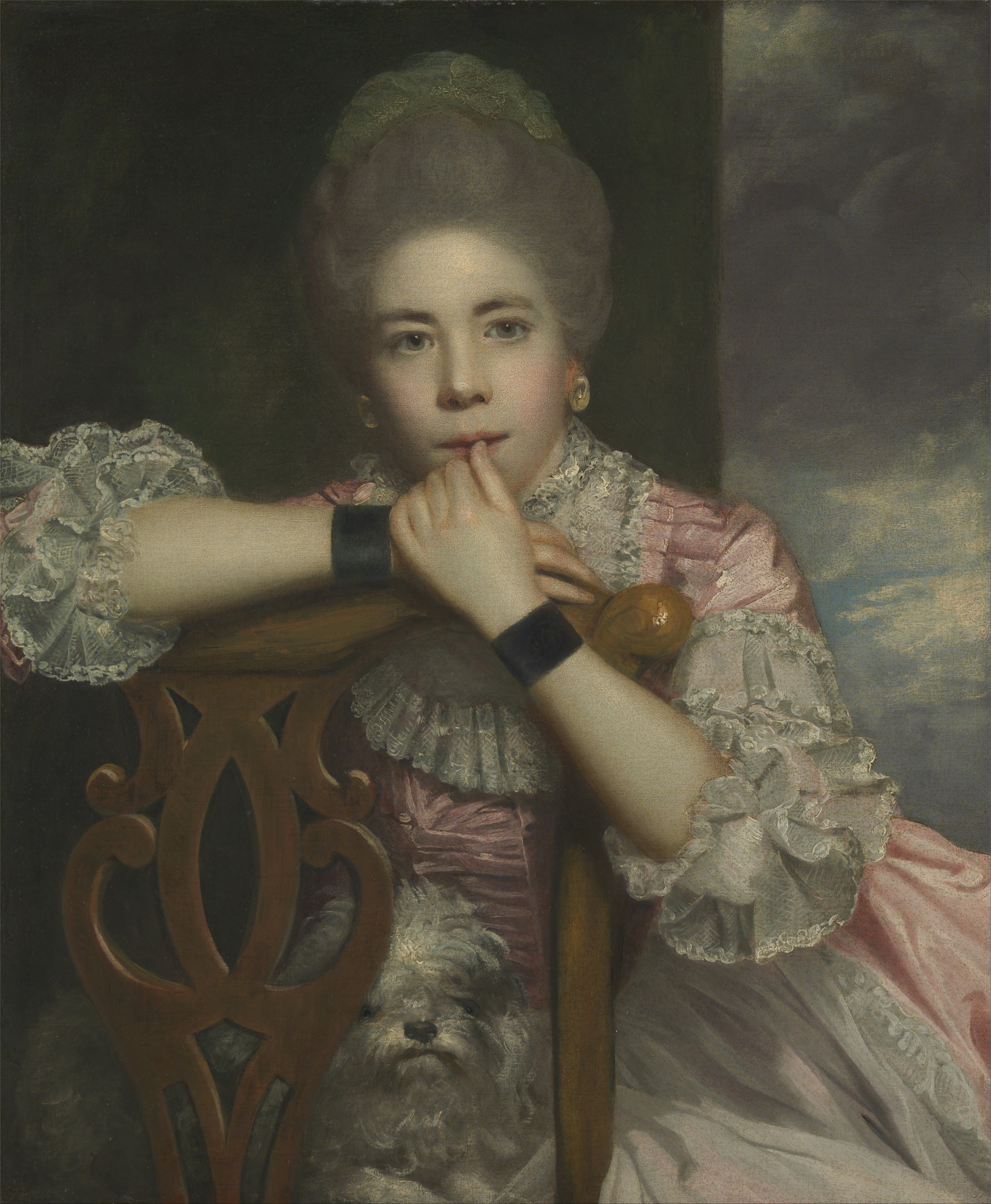
Mrs Abington as Miss Prue by Sir Joshua Reynolds

Her wealth and popularity meant she influenced fashion. The press reported on her hair styles: her low hair in The School for Scandal was praised for changing the fashion. Her performance as Kitty in "High Life Below Stairs" put her in the foremost rank of comic actresses and made the mob cap she wore in the role fashionable. It was soon being referred to as the "Abington Cap" on stage and at hatters' shops across Ireland and England.

It was as the last character in Congreve's Love for Love that Sir Joshua Reynolds painted the best-known of his half-dozen or more portraits of her (illustration, left). In 1782 she left Drury Lane for Covent Garden. After an absence from the stage from 1790 until 1797, she reappeared, quitting finally in 1799.

== Death ==
Frances Abington died on 4 March 1815 at her home on Pall Mall, London. She was buried at St James's Church, Piccadilly.
