= Hugh Kelly (poet) =

Irish dramatist and poet

- Born: 1739; Killarney, Kerry, Ireland
- Died: 3 February 1777 (aged 54–55)
- Notable work: Memoirs of a Magdalen; False Delicacy; A Word to the Wise

Hugh Kelly (c. 1739 – 3 February 1777) was an Irish dramatist and poet. From the 1760s he was employed as a propagandist for the British government, attacking members of the Opposition. After arriving in London in 1760 to work as a staymaker, he soon turned to become a writer and made a living as a journalist. In 1766 he published Thespis, a long poem about the acting profession, which gained him wide attention. He followed up this success with the novel Memoirs of a Magdalen in 1767. He ultimately became known for his stage plays such as the comedy False Delicacy and A Word to the Wise.

== Early life ==
The son of a Dublin publican, Hugh Kelly was born in Killarney, County Kerry. He enjoyed a reasonable education but was forced to drop out following his father's financial difficulties. He was apprenticed to a staymaker, and in 1760, went to London where he worked at his trade for some time, fairly unsuccessfully, and then became an attorney's clerk. He contributed to various newspapers, and wrote pamphlets for booksellers. Much of his early life remains uncertain and relies on anecdotes told by his contemporaries.

== Writer ==
=== First success ===
In 1766, he published anonymously Thespis; or, A Critical Examination into the Merits of All the Principal Performers belonging to Drury Lane Theatre, a poem in the heroic couplet containing violent attacks on the principal contemporary actors and actresses. The poem opens with a panegyric on David Garrick, however, and bestows foolish praise on friends of the writer. This satire was partly inspired by Churchill's Rosciad, but its criticism is obviously dictated chiefly by personal prejudice. In 1767, he produced a second part, less scurrilous in tone, dealing with the Covent Garden actors. This part includes some genuine praise, including that of Mary Wilford (later Mary Bulkley) "blest with a person wholly without fault." In 1767, he published Memoirs of a Magdalen a novel which enjoyed considerable success. The William Kenrick play The Widowed Wife, staged the same year, was largely based on it.

=== False Delicacy ===
His first play, the comedy False Delicacy, written in prose, was produced by Garrick at Drury Lane on 23 January 1768, with the intention of rivalling Oliver Goldsmith's The Good-Natur'd Man which it successfully did. It is a moral and sentimental comedy, described by Garrick in the prologue as a sermon preached in act. Although Samuel Johnson described it as totally void of character, it was very popular. It was translated into several languages and its French and Portuguese versions drew crowded houses in Paris and Lisbon.

=== Journalism and politics ===
Kelly was a journalist in the pay of Lord North, and therefore hated by the supporters of the radical journalist and politician John Wilkes, especially as being the editor of The Public Ledger. His Thespis had also made him many enemies; and Kitty Clive refused to act in his pieces.

=== Further plays ===
The production of his second comedy, A Word to the Wise (Drury Lane, 3 March 1770), occasioned a riot in the theatre, repeated at the second performance, and the piece had to be abandoned. There was still ill-feeling regarding Kelly's defence of the government using force against Wilkes' followers during a recent clash at St George's Field.

His other plays are: Clementina (Covent Garden, 23 February 1771), a blank verse tragedy, given out to be the work of a young American clergyman in order to escape the opposition of the Wilkites; his successful The School for Wives (Drury Lane, 11 December 1773), a prose comedy given out as the work of Major (afterwards Sir William) Addington; a two-act piece, The Romance of an Hour (Covent Garden, 2 December 1774), borrowed from Marmontel's tale L'amitié à l'épreuve; and an unsuccessful comedy, The Man of Reason (Covent Garden, 9 February 1776).

== Lawyer ==
He was called to the bar at the Middle Temple in 1774, and determined to give up literature. He failed in his new profession and died in poverty.

See The Works of Hugh Kelly, to which is prefixed the Life of the Author (1778); Genest, The story of the Stage (v. 163, 263, 269, 308, 399, 457, 517). Pamphlets in reply to Thespis are: Anti-Thespis (1767); The Kellyad... (1767), by Louis Stamma; and The Rescue or Thespian Scourge... (1767), by John Brown-Smith.

He is mentioned in the unfinished Samuel Beckett play Human Wishes.

== Major works ==
=== Plays ===
- False Delicacy (1767)
- A Word to the Wise (1770)
- Clementina (1771)
- The School for Wives (1773)
- The Romance of an Hour (1774)
- The Man of Reason (1776)

=== Novels ===
- Memoirs of a Magdalen (1767)

== Bibliography ==
- Bataille, Robert R. The Writing Life of Hugh Kelly: Politics, Journalism and Theater in Late-Eighteenth Century London. Southern Illinois University Press, 2000.
