= Thomas King (actor) =

English actor, theatre manager and dramatist

Thomas King (1730–1805) was an English actor, known also as a theatre manager and dramatist.

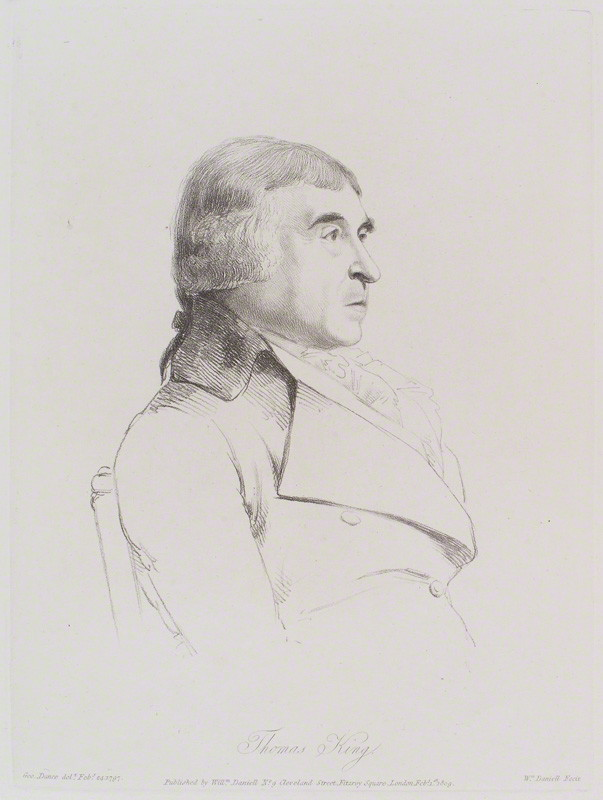
Thomas King, etching by William Daniell

== Early life ==
Born 20 August 1730, in the parish of St George's, Hanover Square, London, where his father was a tradesman, he was educated at a grammar school in Yorkshire, and then at Westminster School. Articled to a London solicitor, he was taken to a dramatic school, and in 1747, with Edward Shuter, he ran away, and joined a travelling company at Tunbridge. He then had a period acting in barns, in the course of which (June 1748) he played in a booth at Windsor, directed by Richard Yates.

== London actor ==
King was seen by David Garrick, who, on the recommendation of Yates, engaged him for Drury Lane. His first part was the Herald in King Lear. On 19 October 1748, when Philip Massinger's New Way to Pay Old Debts was given for the first time at Drury Lane, he played Allworth. He was in the same season the original Murza in Samuel Johnson's Irene, and played a part in The Hen-Peck'd Captain, a farce said to be based on The Campaigners by Thomas d'Urfey.

During the summer King played opposite Hannah Pritchard at Jacob's Well Theatre in Bristol. There he impressed William Whitehead. On his return to Drury Lane King found himself announced for George Barnwell in The London Merchant, one of his Bristol roles. At the end of this season he went with Miss Cole to Dublin.

== In Dublin ==
King's first appearance under Thomas Sheridan at the Smock Alley Theatre took place in September 1750, as Ranger in the Suspicious Husband. King remained there for eight years, making his reputation in comedy, with one season, beginning in September 1755, when he was the manager and principal actor at the Bath Theatre. On 23 October 1758 he appeared at the Crow Street Theatre as Trappanti in She would and she would not.

== Leading actor in London ==
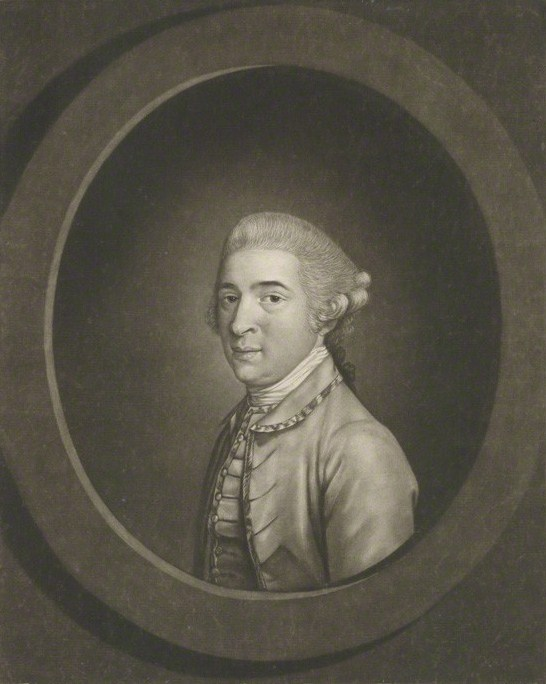
Thomas King, 1772 engraving by John Raphael Smith, after Hugh Douglas Hamilton

The troubles of the Dublin theatres drove King back to Drury Lane, where he became a mainstay of the cast for over 30 years. He reappeared as Tom in the Conscious Lovers, on 2 October 1759, and was assigned leading parts. With occasional visits to Dublin or to country towns, and with one season at Covent Garden and a summer visit to the Haymarket, he remained at Drury Lane until 1802. On his reappearance at Drury Lane he was accompanied by Mary Baker, a hornpipe dancer, who then made her first appearance at Drury Lane. He married her in 1766, and she retired from the stage 9 May 1772. King's characters covered well over one hundred parts.

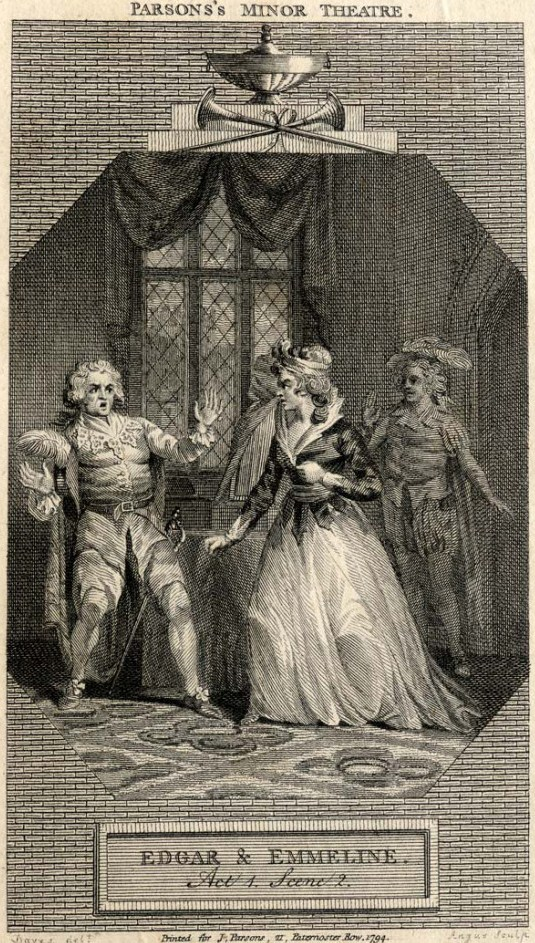
Engraving after Edward Dayes of a scene from Edgar and Emmeline by John Hawkesworth. The actors are William O'Brien as Edgar, Thomas King as Florimond and Mary Ann Yates as Emmeline.

At Drury Lane King was, on 31 October 1759, the original Sir Harry's servant in High Life Below Stairs, and on 12 December the original Squire Groom in Charles Macklin's Love à la Mode. With his performance of Lord Ogleby in the Clandestine Marriage of Garrick and Colman, on 20 February 1766, he reached a peak of his career. Garrick studied the part and resigned it to King, who accepted it with reluctance, but Garrick was pleased with his conception.

In July 1766 King broke his leg, and was unable to act until the following November. On 8 May 1777, when he was the original Sir Peter Teazle in the outstanding first representation of The School for Scandal, King also spoke Garrick's prologue. On 29 October 1779, in the original cast of The Critic, King was Puff. His original characters amounted to about eighty.

King played also in his own pieces. Love at First Sight, a ballad-farce, by him (1763), was acted at Drury Lane on 17 October 1763, King playing in it Smatter, a servant who personates his master. Wit's Last Stake (1769), another farce, was given at Drury Lane on 14 April 1768; It was an adaptation of Le Légataire Universel by Jean-François Regnard, and its success was attributed to King's reading of the part of Martin, the Crispin of the original, a servant who personates a man supposed to be dying, and dictates a will by which he himself benefits. Under the title of A Will and no Will, or Wit's Last Stake, it was revived on 24 April 1799 for King's benefit, on which occasion King was Linger the invalid, and Bannister, jun., Martin.

== Actor-manager ==
On the death of William Powell King bought his share in the King Street Theatre. There during the summer seasons of 1770 and 1771 he was actor and sole manager. He then sold his share to James William Dodd, and purchased from builder 75% of Sadler's Wells, in which he was associated with Samuel Arnold. He made some changes in the performances, raised the prices of admission, and provided horse patrols, to guard through a dangerous district the fashionable visitors whom he attracted. His prices entitled the visitor to receive a pint of wine at an added cost of sixpence. In 1778 King sold his share, and was succeeded by Richard Wroughton.

King was elected, on 14 February 1779, master of the Drury Lane Theatrical Fund, and resigned September 1782, on accepting the management of Drury Lane. He found he earned less as a manager than as an actor. In June 1783 he contradicted a rumour that he was about to retire from the stage. He reported then acted at Edinburgh and Glasgow as well as in Dublin, though James Caxton Dibdin, the historian of the Edinburgh stage, does not mention his presence that year, and speaks of his performance of Lord Ogleby on 28 March 1789 as his first appearance in Edinburgh. In October 1783 it was announced in the newspapers that King was not connected with the management of Drury Lane; but he took a salary. He delivered on his reappearance an address in verse, by Cumberland. In 1785 he seems to have resumed his management of Drury Lane, and is said to have been responsible for the successful pantomime of that year, Hurly Burly, or the Fairy of the Well. In September 1788 he again resigned the management and his connection with the theatre, announcing on 13 September that his authority had only been nominal. He had found Richard Brinsley Sheridan a busy man to deal with.

== Later life ==
King took to gambling. One night, when he had recovered some of his heavy losses, he took an oath that he would never touch dice again. This he kept until the death of Garrick (1779). Around 1783 King had a villa at Hampton, and was robbed by highwaymen on his journey home. In 1785 he entered his name at Miles's Club in St. James's Street. Shortly afterwards he lost all his savings, was compelled to forego a proposed purchase of a share in Drury Lane, and to sell his villa. He moved to a house in Store Street.

On 20 November 1789 King made, as Touchstone, his first appearance at Covent Garden, and the same evening was the original Sir John Trotley in Bon Ton by Garrick. After playing several of his best-known characters, he appeared for his benefit on 2 February 1790 as Sancho in Lovers' Quarrels, which was an adaptation, attributed to King himself, of John Vanbrugh's The Mistake. On 23 October 1790, as Lord Ogleby, he reappeared at Drury Lane, and during the rebuilding of the theatre moved with the company to the Haymarket Opera House. On 2 August 1792 he played at the Haymarket Falstaff in the First Part of King Henry IV, and on the 23rd was General Touchwood in Cross Partners, a comedy announced as by a lady. In September 1792 he rejoined the Drury Lane company, then playing at the Haymarket, and in March 1794 appeared with them at their newly built home, where he remained until the end of his career.

== Last years and death ==
On 24 May 1802, for his last benefit, King played his celebrated character Sir Peter Teazle. At the close he spoke an address written for him by Richard Cumberland. In the green-room, Dorothy Jordan presented him with an engraved silver cup subscribed for by the company.

King died in Store Street on 11 December 1805. On the 20th he was buried in the vault of St Paul's, Covent Garden. His pall-bearers included Alexander Pope, John Moody, Richard Wroughton, Robert Palmer, William Powell, Henry Siddons, and other actors. A benefit for Mrs. King followed. She died on 30 November 1813.

== Selected roles ==
- Belcour in The West Indian by Richard Cumberland (1771)
- Sir Paul Panick in False Colours by Edward Morris (1793)
- Tempest in The Wheel of Fortune by Richard Cumberland (1795)
- Sir Valentine Vapour in Fashionable Friends by Mary Berry (1802)

== Notes ==
Attribution

This article incorporates text from a publication now in the public domain: "King, Thomas (1730-1805)". Dictionary of National Biography. London: Smith, Elder & Co. 1885–1900.
