= Manuel Robbe =

French printmaker (1872–1936)

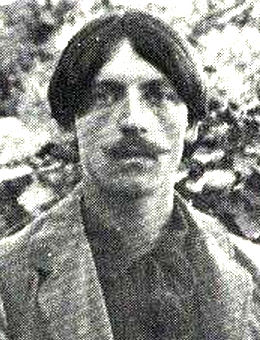
Manuel Robbe

Emmanuel Robbe (16 December 1872 – 5 July 1936) was a French painter and printmaker, best remembered as a proponent of the aquatint and à la poupée techniques in etching. A graduate of the Académie Julian and Beaux-Arts de Paris, his works were regularly published in the magazines Les Maîtres de l'Affiche, L'Estampe Moderne, and Cocorico. He also exhibited at the Société des Artistes Français and the 1900 Paris Exposition where he was awarded a bronze medal. He also served in First World War, and was awarded a Croix de guerre for his service.

== Biography ==
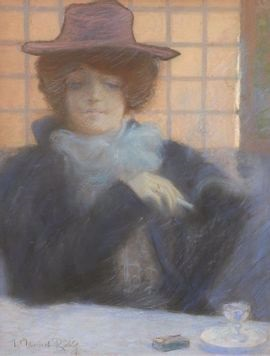
Woman sitting in a bar smoking a cigarette, c. 1899

Manuel Robbe was born on 16 December 1872 in the 19th arrondissement of Paris. He attended the Lycée Condorcet, where he became friends with Gaston de Pawlowski, and then transferred to the Lycée Louis-le-Grand, one of the best grammar schools in France. He then became a pupil at the Académie Julian, where he came into contact with many famous personalities, before transferring to the École des Beaux-Arts in Paris. There he learnt the finer points of etching and aquatint etching from the master etcher Eugène Delâtre. He exhibited regularly at the salons of the Société des Artistes Français and was awarded a bronze medal at the 1900 World Exhibition for his contribution to printmaking.

Robbe quickly became a successful etcher, specialising in the aquatint technique. He exhibited regularly at the salons of the Société des artistes français; the Parisian dealers Edmond Sagot, Georges Petit and Pierrefort published and distributed his etchings. In 1895, his poster for the paraffin lamp L'Éclatante appeared in the magazine Les Maîtres de l'affiche (1895–1900), edited by Jules Chéret. An etching entitled Menuet d'automne was published in L'Estampe moderne (1897).

At the 1900 Universal Exhibition, he received a bronze medal for an etching entitled L'été. His drawings were published in Cocorico (1898–1900) and Le Frou-frou (1901–1902). Between 1905 and 1907, the Galerie Georges Petit exhibited his works as part of the annual Salon of the Société de la gravure originale en couleurs. Over the course of his artistic career, Manuel Robbe created numerous aquatint etchings, drypoint etchings and several advertising posters, as well as works in other techniques (oil paintings, watercolours and pastels). As a successful sportsman, he was captain of the Beaux-Arts fencing team at the inter-professional championships in Paris in 1912. During the 1914-1918 war, he enlisted in the air force as an aviator, which is why there are only a few works from this period, but several prints depicting German and French military aircraft.

Manuel Robbe's works bear witness to the life of the people of his time. Manuel Robbe loved travelling and had a deep attachment to Brittany, which he depicted on many occasions. He suffered from an incurable illness and died on 5 July 1936 in the 18th arrondissement of Paris.

== Bibliography ==
- Emmanuel Bénézit: Dictionary of artists. Band 11: Pinchon – Rouck. Paris, 2006
- Arthur M. Hind: A History of Engraving and Etching. Courier Corporation, 2011. ISBN 978-0-486-14887-8
- Coloured Etchings France. Gabriel Mourey, in: The Studio, Band 27, Dezember 1902, Nr. 117, S. 159–163.
- Gabriel P. Weisberg (Vorwort), Charles Perussaux und Ivo Kirschen (Hrsg.): Manuel Robbe 1872–1936, Color Aquatints, Bände I und II, Chicago, Merrill Chase Galleries, 1979.
- Gabriel P. Weisberg: Manuel Robbe – From impressionism to symbolism. Beverly Hills, Galerie Michael, 1987.
