= Peter Ilsted =

Danish printmaker and painter

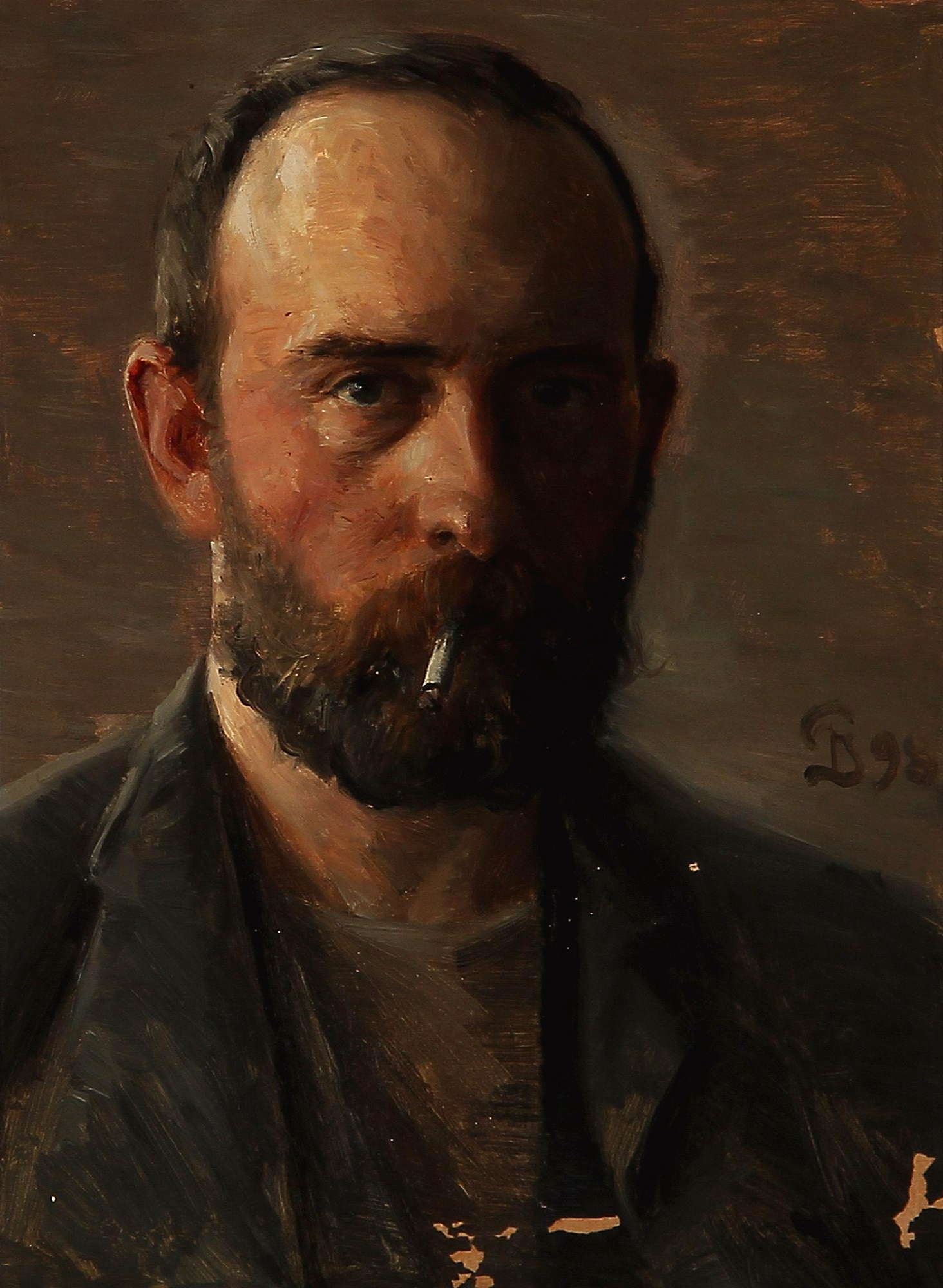
Artist's self-portrait with a cigaret, 1898

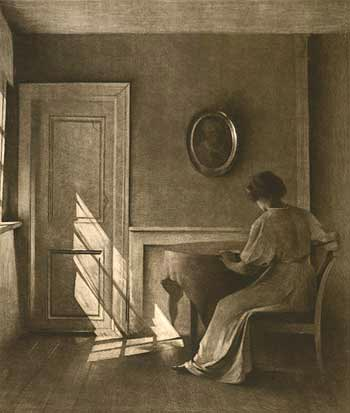
Sunshine Falling on a Door, mezzotint in black, Vess Collection

Peter Ilsted (14 February 1861 – 16 April 1933) was a Danish printmaker and painter. He was most associated with domestic interior scenes.

== Biography ==
Peter Vilhelm Ilsted was born at Sakskøbing in Guldborgsund, Denmark. He was the son of merchant Jens Peter Ilsted and Johanne Sophie Lund. His sister Ida married the painter Vilhelm Hammershøi (1864–1916) in 1891. He married Ingeborg Lovisa Petersen (1869–1945) in 1891.

He came to the Royal Danish Academy of Fine Arts in 1878, completing his course of study in five years. He made his debut at the Charlottenborg Spring Exhibition in 1883. Two years later, he joined a study trip across Italy to Egypt, Palestine, Greece and Turkey. Later he visited Scotland, England, Holland, Belgium, Spain, Morocco and France. With support from the Cultural Ministry, he traveled to the Exposition Universelle (1889) in Paris. He was awarded the Eckersberg Medal in 1890 and 1899. He became an assistant at the Royal Danish Academy from 1893–1905 and worked periodically as a conservator-restorer. Ilsted died in Copenhagen in 1933.

== Artistic style ==
Peter Ilsted and Vilhelm Hammershøi, together with Carl Holsøe (1863–1935), were leading artists in early 20th-century Denmark. All three artists were members of the Free Exhibitions (Den Frie Udstilling), a progressive artists association founded in 1891. They are famous for painting images of "Sunshine and Silent Rooms", all in subtle colors. Their works reflect the orderliness of a tranquil life — similar to the earlier works of Vermeer. Their art was later referred to as the ‘Copenhagen Interior School’. These interiors evoke at once a sense of calm and mystery. The orderly rooms are often viewed from behind—causing one to wonder whether the scenes are really tranquil. James McNeill Whistler, Duret and important art critics were early admirers and collectors of Ilsted's works.

While at first glance their work appears similar, Ilsted and Hammershøi were in fact quite different. Hammershøi's work has an aloof austerity, in contrast to Ilsted's scenes of common life. Though sometimes Hammershøi's colorful early pictures are reminiscent of James Tissot (1836–1902), his work is quintessentially Danish. However, Ilsted was more of a technician, and he made considerable contributions in the field of graphic arts. Ilsted's mezzotints (sometimes printed in colour à la poupée) were very popular and important in his day. They were an innovation in the media. Ilsted exhibited his work all over Europe, in London in 1907, in Germany and at the Paris Salon, where Europe's art community was first exposed to his work.

Ilsted was a great success in his lifetime and won many awards and accolades for his work. He was the only member of the group to also focus on printmaking. Ilsted's achievements in mezzotints were revolutionary. Some of his mezzotints, most of which were created in black as well as color editions, are considered among the greatest ever made. His greatest contribution, which T. F. Šimon (1877–1942), Manuel Robbe (1872– 1936), and others seemingly adopted was that of inking the plate à la poupée. Some art historians have argued that these three men created the technique at about the same time but without consultation. This is uncertain.

The Metropolitan Museum of Art (New York) held an important exhibition on the work of Ilsted, Hammershøi, and Vermeer in 2001.

== Gallery ==
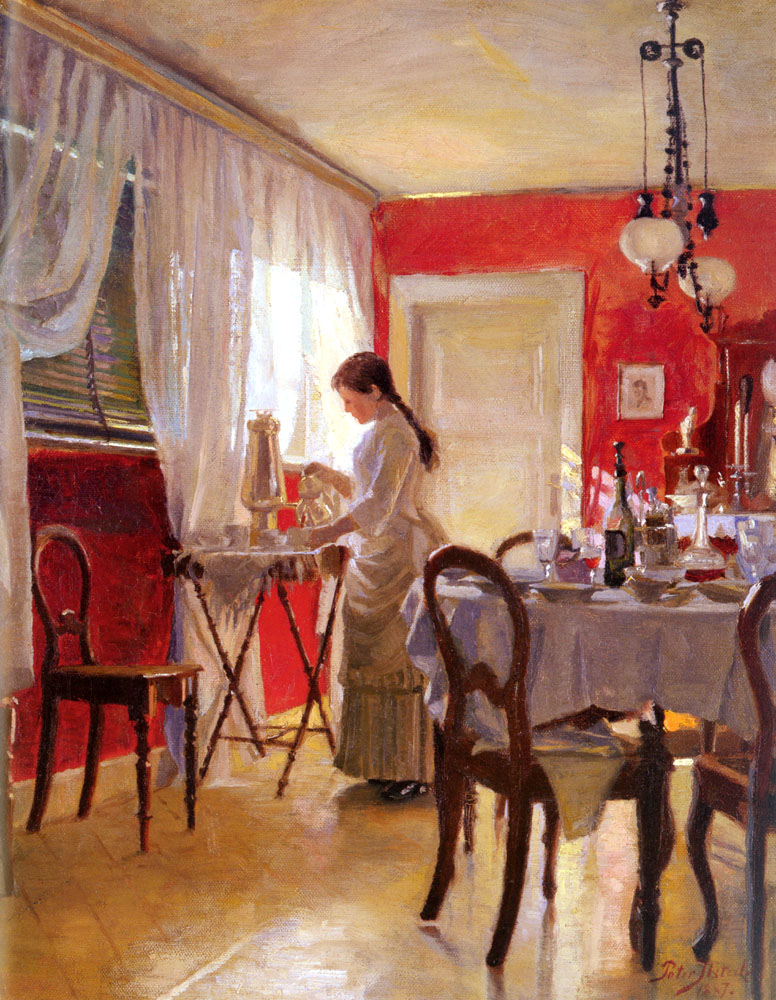
The Dining Room
(c. 1887)

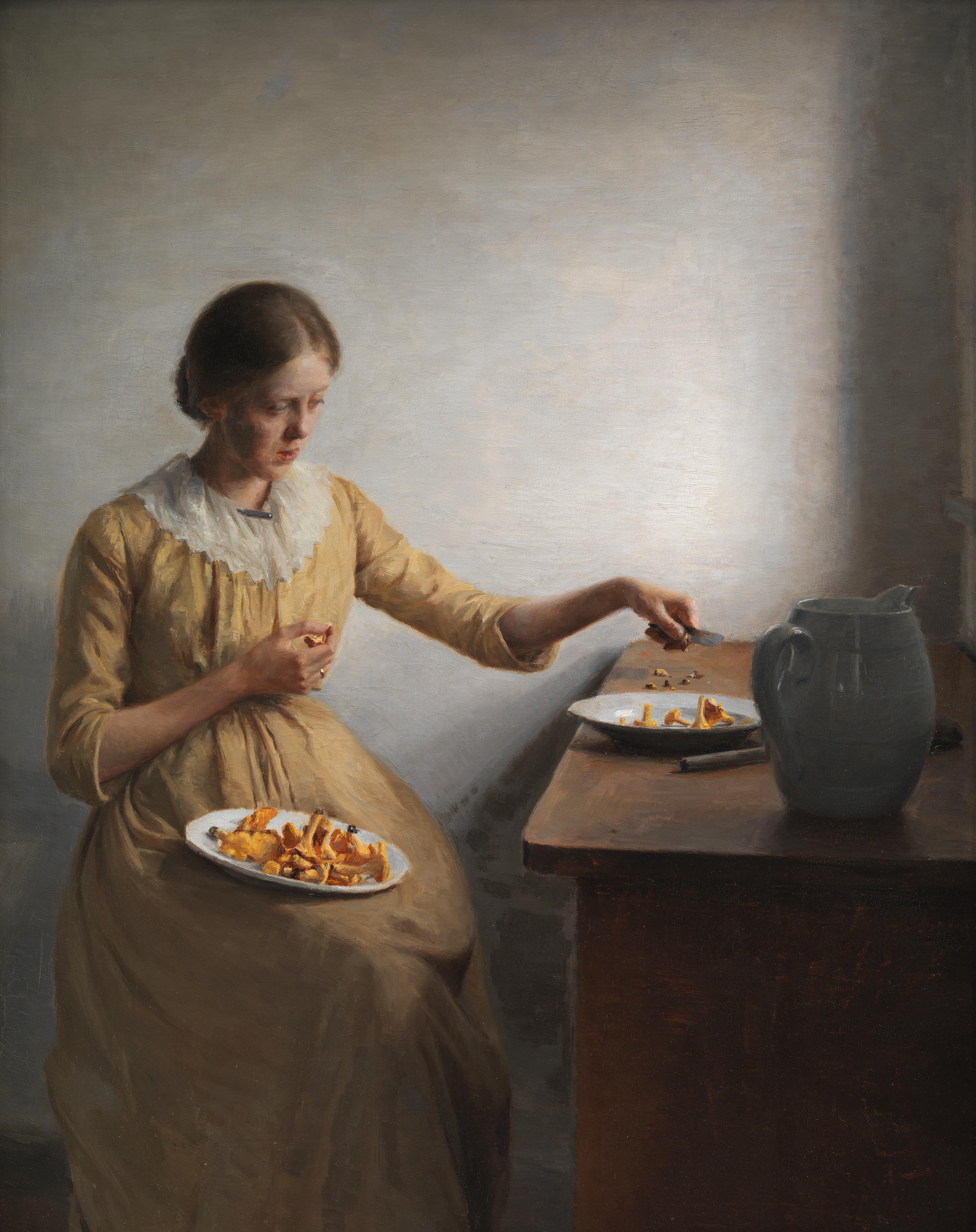
Young Girl Preparing Chantarelles
(1892)

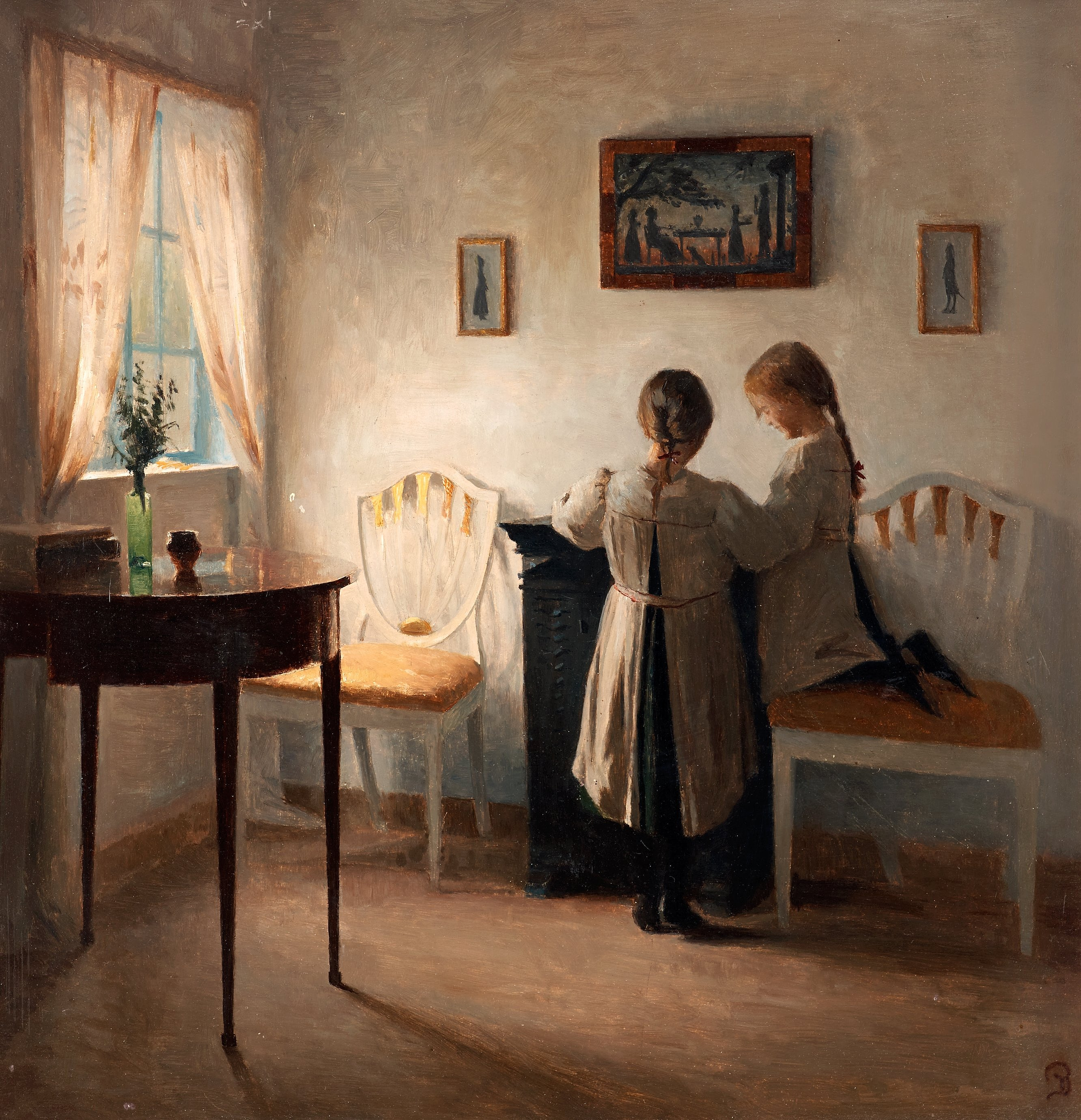
Interior with two girls
(c. 1900)

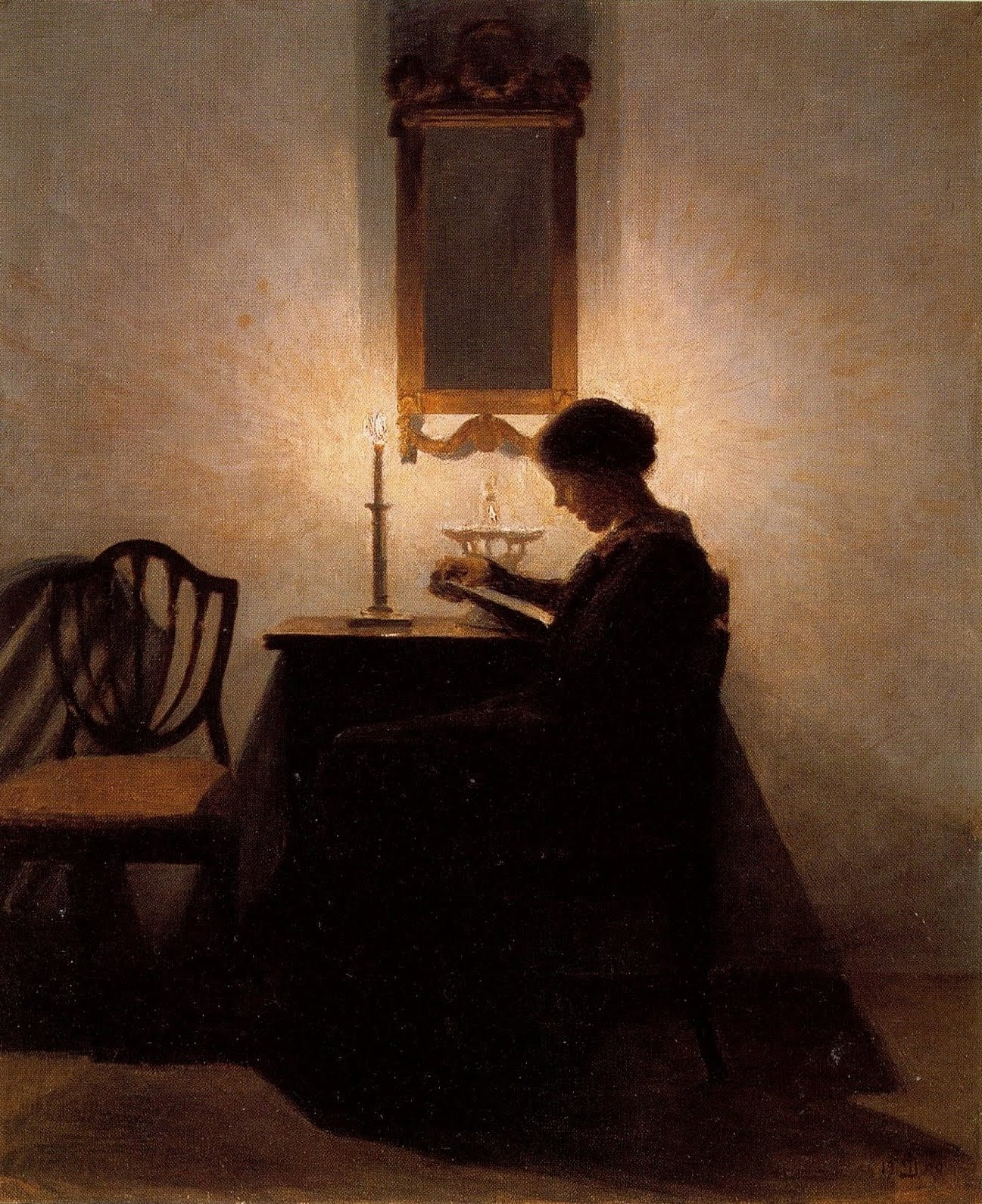
Woman reading
(1907)

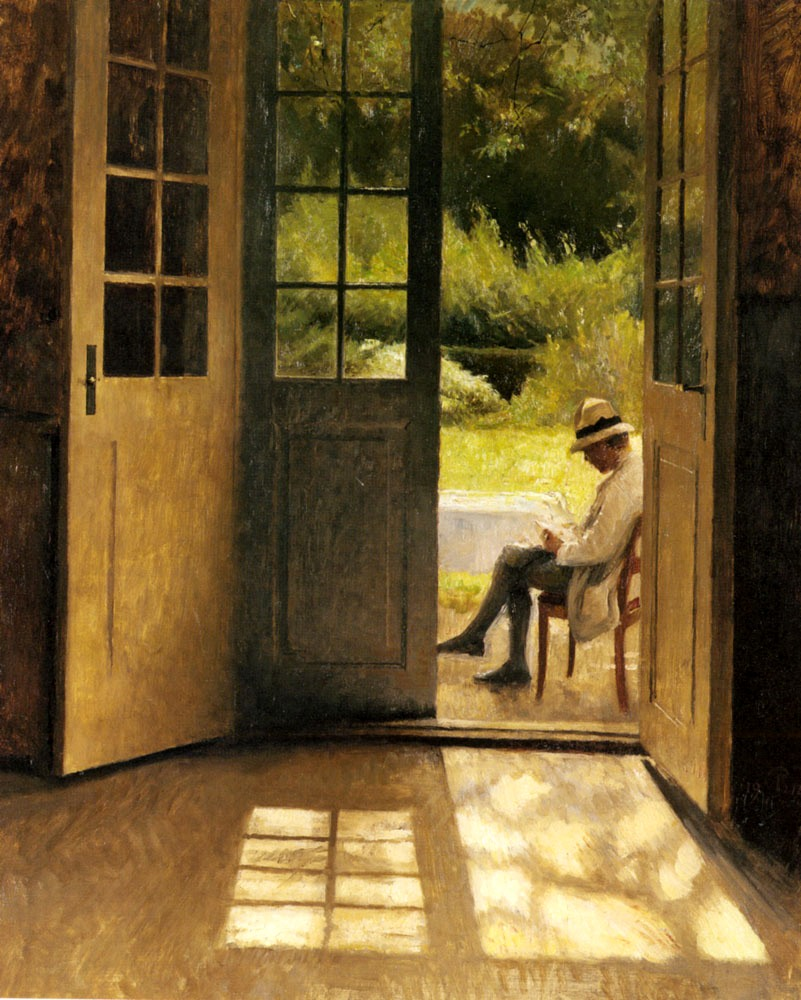
The Open Door
(c. 1910)

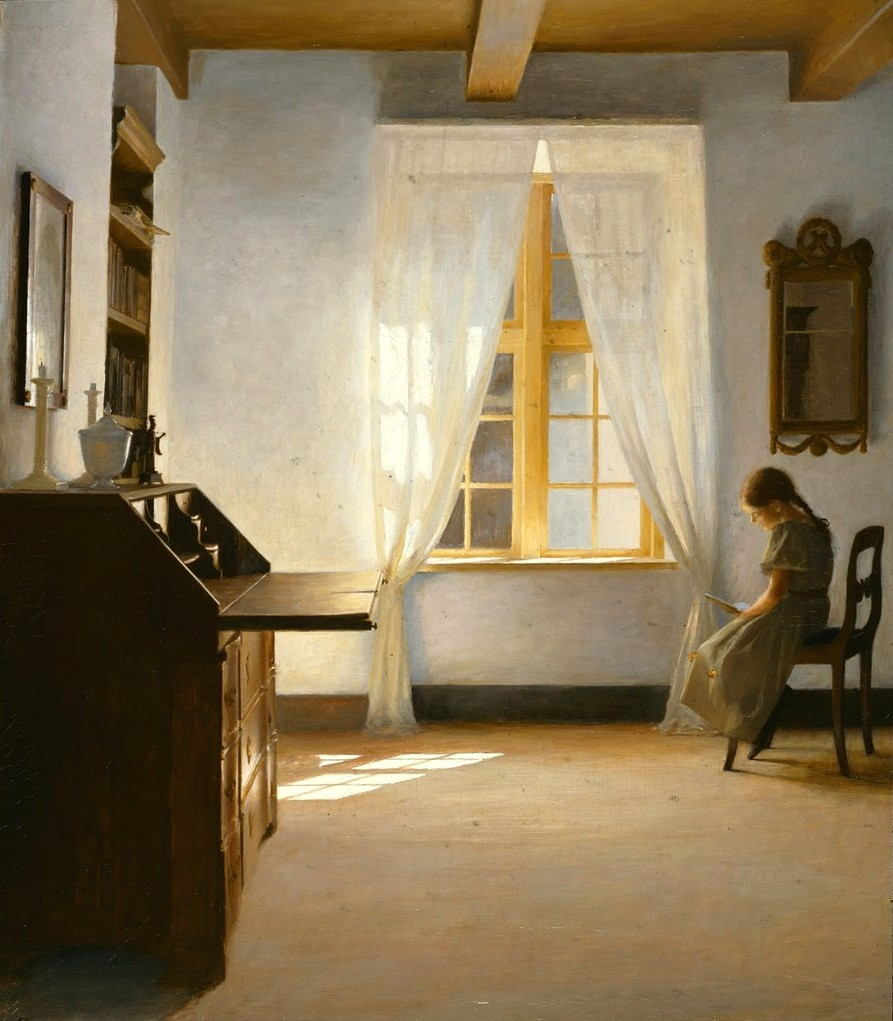
Interior With Girl Reading
(c. 1910)

== Other sources ==
- Donson, Theodore B. (1990) Peter Ilsted (1861–1933): Sunshine and Silent Rooms (Theodore B. Donson Ltd.)
- Lange, Bente (2011) Den Frie – Kunstnernes Hus (Den Frie Udstillingsbygning) ISBN 978-87-993178-3-7
- Berman, Patricia G. (2007) In Another Light: Danish Painting in the Nineteenth Century (Vendome Press) ISBN 978-0865651814
