= Paul-Émile Boutigny =

French painter (1853–1929)

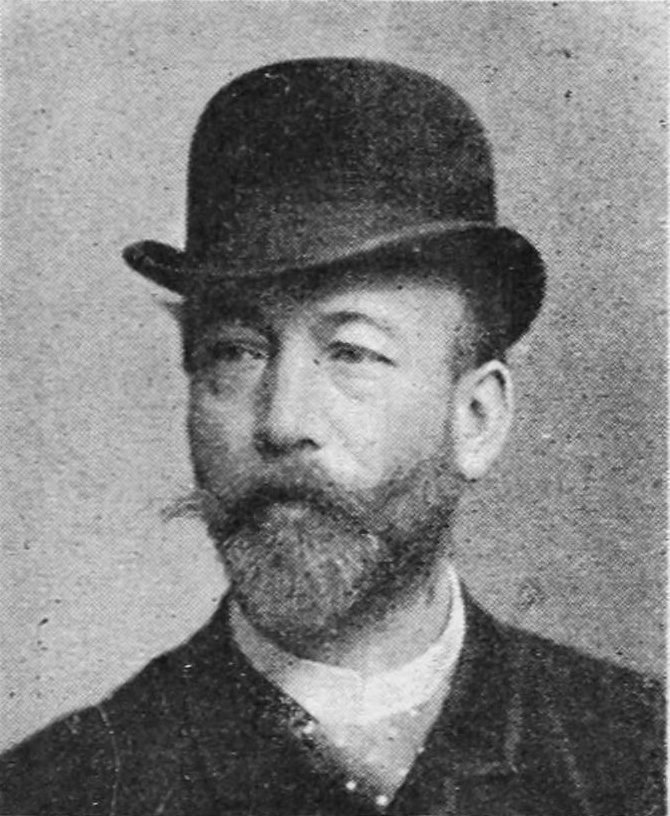
Paul-Émile Boutigny (mid 1890s). Photograph by Wilhelm Benque

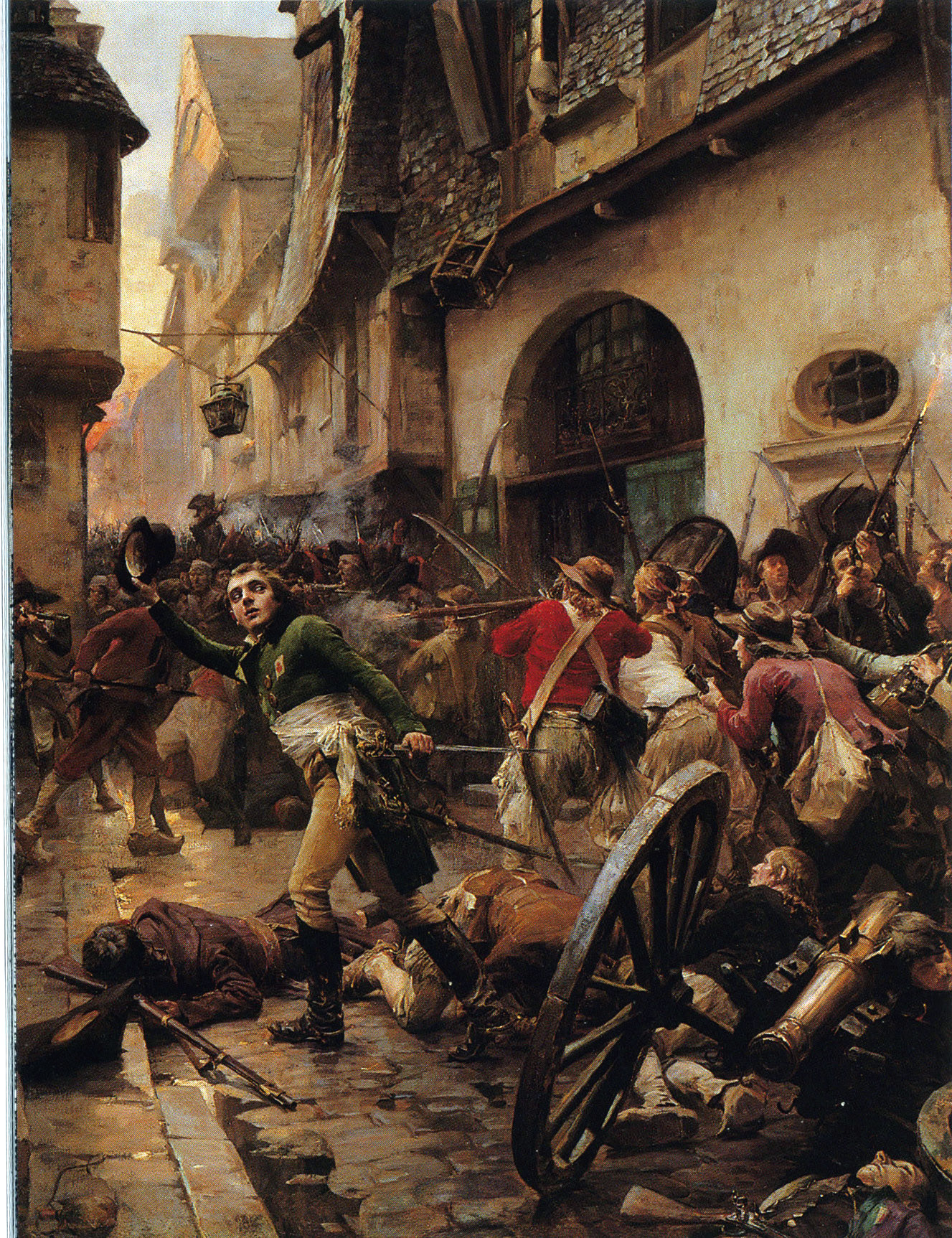
Henri de La Rochejaquelein at the Second Battle of Cholet (1899)

Paul-Émile Boutigny (French pronunciation: [pɔl emil butiɲi]; 10 March 1853 in Paris – 27 June 1929 in Paris) was a French academist painter who specialized in military subjects.

== Life and work ==
His father was a tailor and his mother worked as a seamstress. Following the Franco-Prussian War, he studied at the École des Beaux-Arts under Alexandre Cabanel and developed a unique style of battle painting, drawn from personal experience. He was a regular participant in the Salon after 1880.

He was decorated with the Légion d'honneur in 1898. That same year, he began producing the satirical, artistic and literary journal Cocorico, which promoted Art Nouveau.

He illustrated several works:

- Chants du Soldat, a popular collection of patriotic poems by Paul Déroulède. Calmann Lévy, Paris 1881
- Boule de Suif by Guy de Maupassant, Calmann Lévy, Paris 1899
- Les Héros de France (Hoche, Marceau and Desaix) by Théodore Cahu, SDL, Paris 1900
- L'attaque du Moulin by Émile Zola, from the anthology Les Soirées de Médan, Collection des Dix, Paris 1901

Some of his most familiar paintings include:

- An Episode from the Quiberon Affair (1881). Musée des Beaux-Arts et Arts Décoratifs de Mirande
- The Seventh Line to Attack Malakoff and the Death of Captain Pagès (1887). Hall of Honor of the Seventh Infantry Regiment.
- Napoléon – The Battle of Aspern-Essling – Death of Jean Lannes, Marshall of the Empire (1894)
- Napoléon Bonaparte – The Revolt at Pavia (1895)
