= Achim Hollerieth =

German footballer

Personal information
- Date of birth: 24 September 1973 (age 53)
- Place of birth: Pfullendorf, West Germany
- Height: 1.92 m (6 ft 4 in)
- Position: Goalkeeper

Senior career*
Years	Team	Apps	(Gls)
1992–1996	SC Pfullendorf		
1996–1999	KFC Uerdingen 05	40	(0)
1999–2000	VfB Stuttgart	1	(0)
2000–2002	Waldhof Mannheim	47	(0)
2003	SSV Reutlingen	3	(0)
2003–2006	FC St. Pauli	90	(0)
2007–2008	SV 19 Straelen	6	(0)
2008	VfB Lübeck	12	(0)
2008	FC Schaffhausen	11	(0)
Total		210	(0)

Managerial career
- 2012–2013: FC Elmshorn
- 2014: VfB Germania Halberstadt
- 2016: FSV Union Fürstenwalde
- 2016–2018: TSG Neustrelitz
- 2019–2020: TB Uphusen
- 2020–2021: FC Teutonia Ottensen
- * Club domestic league appearances and goals

Achim Hollerieth (born 24 September 1973) is a German former professional footballer who played as a goalkeeper.

== Playing career ==
Hollerieth started out as a forward and only became a goalkeeper in a U18 team.

He spent three seasons in the 2. Bundesliga with KFC Uerdingen 05. During this time, he was voted best goalkeeper of the league in the 1998–99 season.

Hollerieth's performances for Uerdingen earned him a move to Bundesliga club VfB Stuttgart where he was understudy to Franz Wohlfahrt.

He left VfB Stuttgart after one season joining Waldhof Mannheim on a three-year contract.

In 2008 he had an unsuccessful trial with FC Augsburg.

== Coaching career ==
In March 2020 Hollerieth left Oberliga Niedersachsen club TB Uphusen mid-season to join Regionalliga Nord side FC Teutonia Ottensen citing his personal and job situation. In April 2021 he left Teutonia Ottensen.
