= Johan Teyler =

Dutch painter

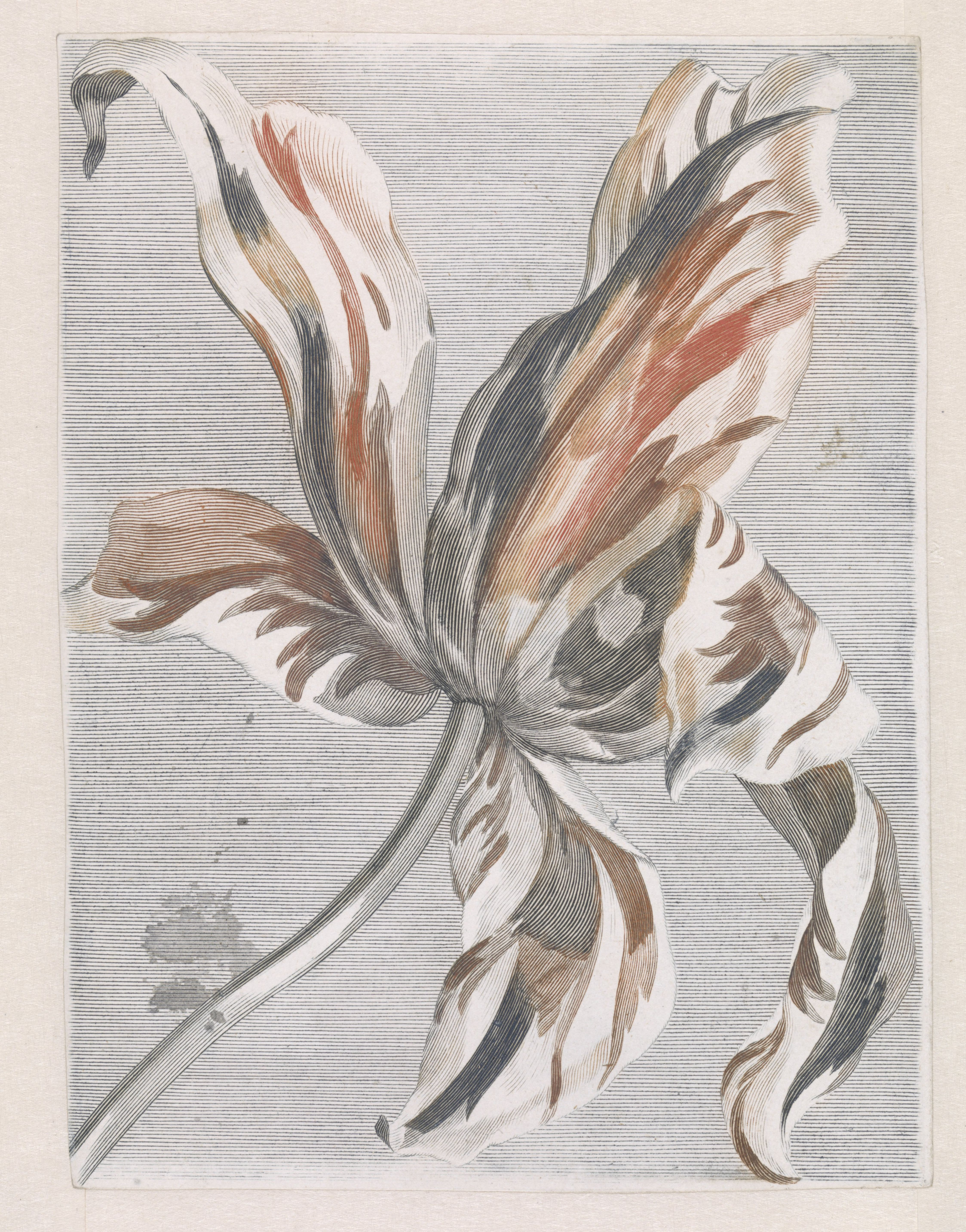
Dutch à la poupée print in three colors, of a tulip, c. 1690s, Teyler workshop

Johannes or Johan Teyler (23 May 1648 – c.1709) was a Dutch Golden Age painter, engraver, mathematics teacher, and promoter of the technique in color printmaking now known as à la poupée.

== Biography ==
Teyler was born at Nijmegen. His father was William Taylor, an English or Scottish mercenary, who changed his name to Teyler. Johan studied Latin at the Latin school of Nijmegen and Mathematics at the Kwartierlijke Academie, where he wrote a dissertation in favor of Descartes. After the death of his father, he studied in Leiden and afterwards acquired a post as Professor of Math and Philosophy in Nijmegen in 1670. He was a respected professor but was overlooked for promotion due to his Cartesian ideas. Through the mediation of his friend Gottfried Leibniz he attempted to acquire a professorship in Wolfenbüttel but gave up after discussions with Christiaan Huygens. The rest of his career was outside Academia. In 1676 he became Vestingbouwkundige fortification manager for Frederick William I, Elector of Brandenburg during the Scanian War. In 1678 he also became a tutor for the Elector's sons.

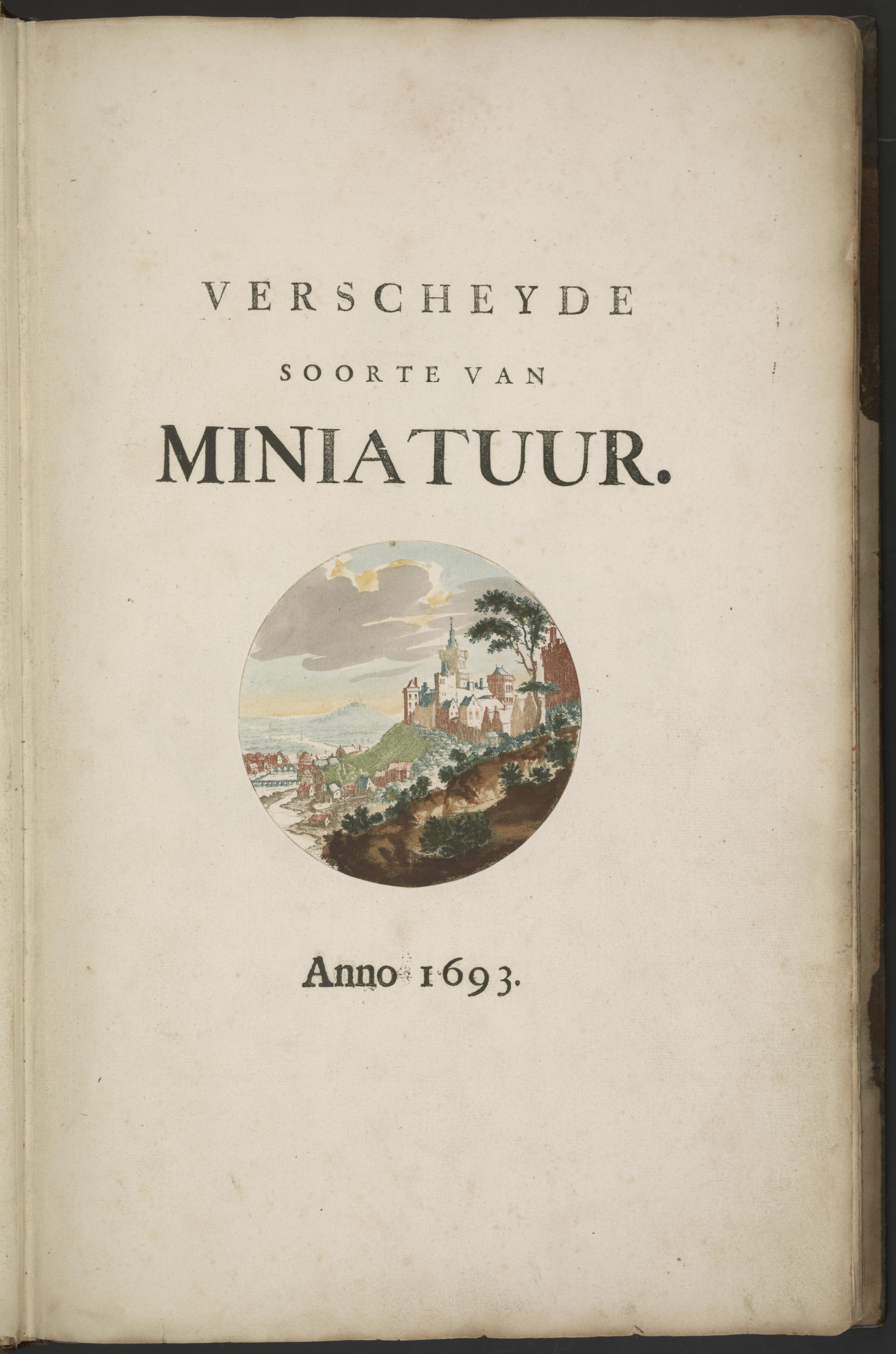
Title page of Verscheyde soorte van miniatuur, 1693. From the Rosenwald Collection, Library of Congress.

Later the same year he was dismissed and returned to Nijmegen to receive backpay which was still owed him there. With the extra funds he undertook a trip to Italy, Egypt, the Holy Land and Malta, and later sent his diary to the Elector. He later wrote a popular book on fortifications in 1688 called Architectura militaris (Rotterdam, 1688), and in the same year received a patent on a color printing process that involved using different colors of ink at the same time when printing plates. In 1695 he had a printing workshop in Rijswijk where he printed military-related works, but in 1697 he sold it and in 1698 undertook another trip to Berlin.

According to Houbraken he was a friend of Jacob de Heusch and a colleague in the Bentvueghels with the nickname Speculatie, who travelled with De Heusch to Berlin in 1698. They knew each other from their time in Rome as members of the Bentvueghel club, where Teyler also consorted with his former Math pupil from Nijmegen Jan van Call.

According to the RKD where he is registered as a painter, he returned from Italy in 1683 and remained in Nijmegen except for his trip to Berlin.

The Rijksmuseum has several hundred à la poupée prints by his workshop, many in multiple impressions, allowing the differences between each impression that are inevitable with the technique to be seen.

== External resources ==
- Verscheyde soorte van miniatuur. [n.p.] 1693.[n.p.] 1693. From the Lessing J. Rosenwald Collection at the Library of Congress
- Color print from Admirandorum quadruplex spectaculum; delectum, pictum, et aeri in cisum, by Jan van Call
