= Elisha Kirkall =

English engraver

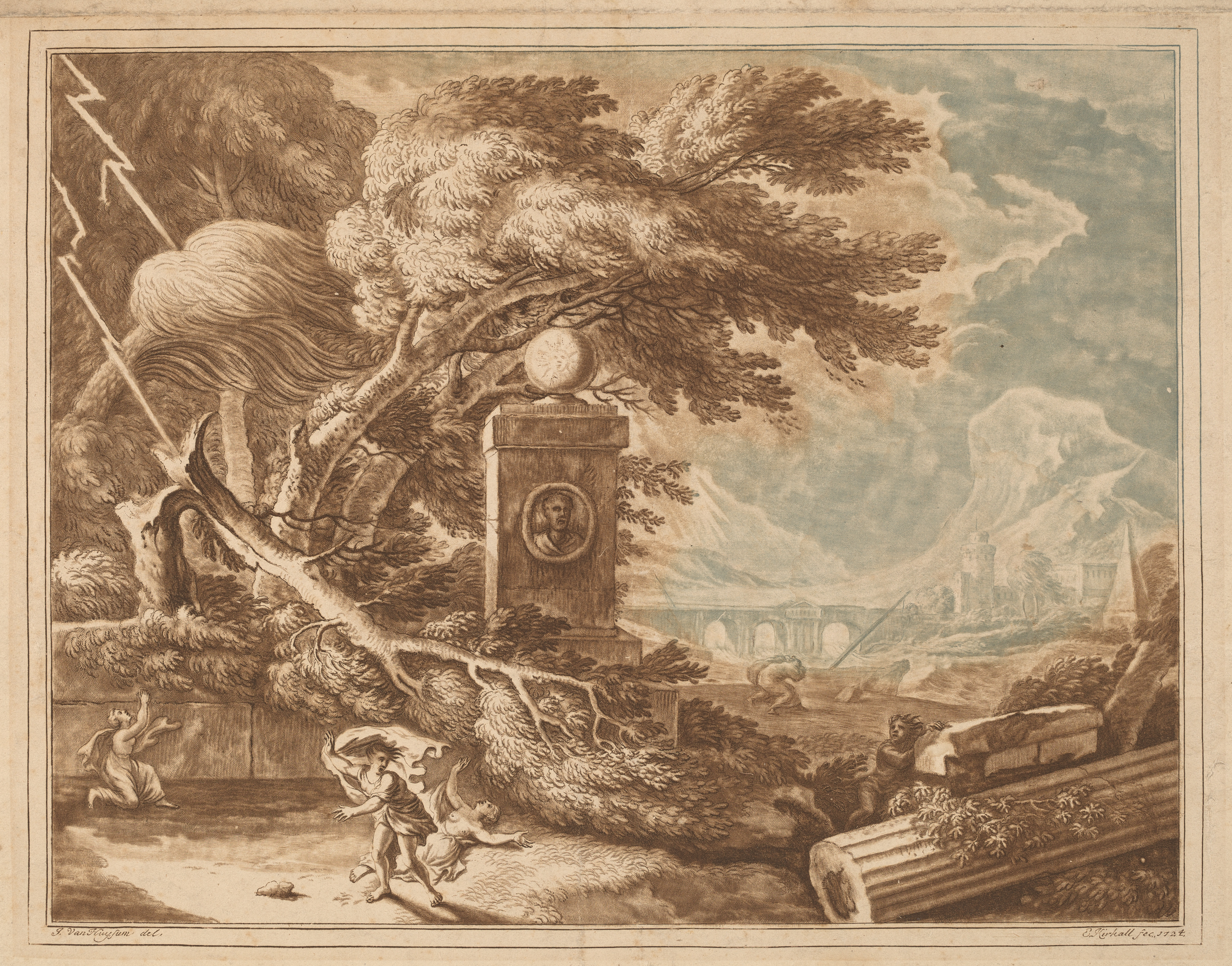
Heroic Stormy Landscape, mezzotint and etching printed à la poupée in two colours, after Jan van Huysum, 1724

Elisha Kirkall (c.1682–1742) was a prolific English engraver, who made many experiments in printmaking techniques. He was noted for engravings on type metal that could be set up with letterpress for book illustrations, and was also known as a mezzotint artist.

== Life ==
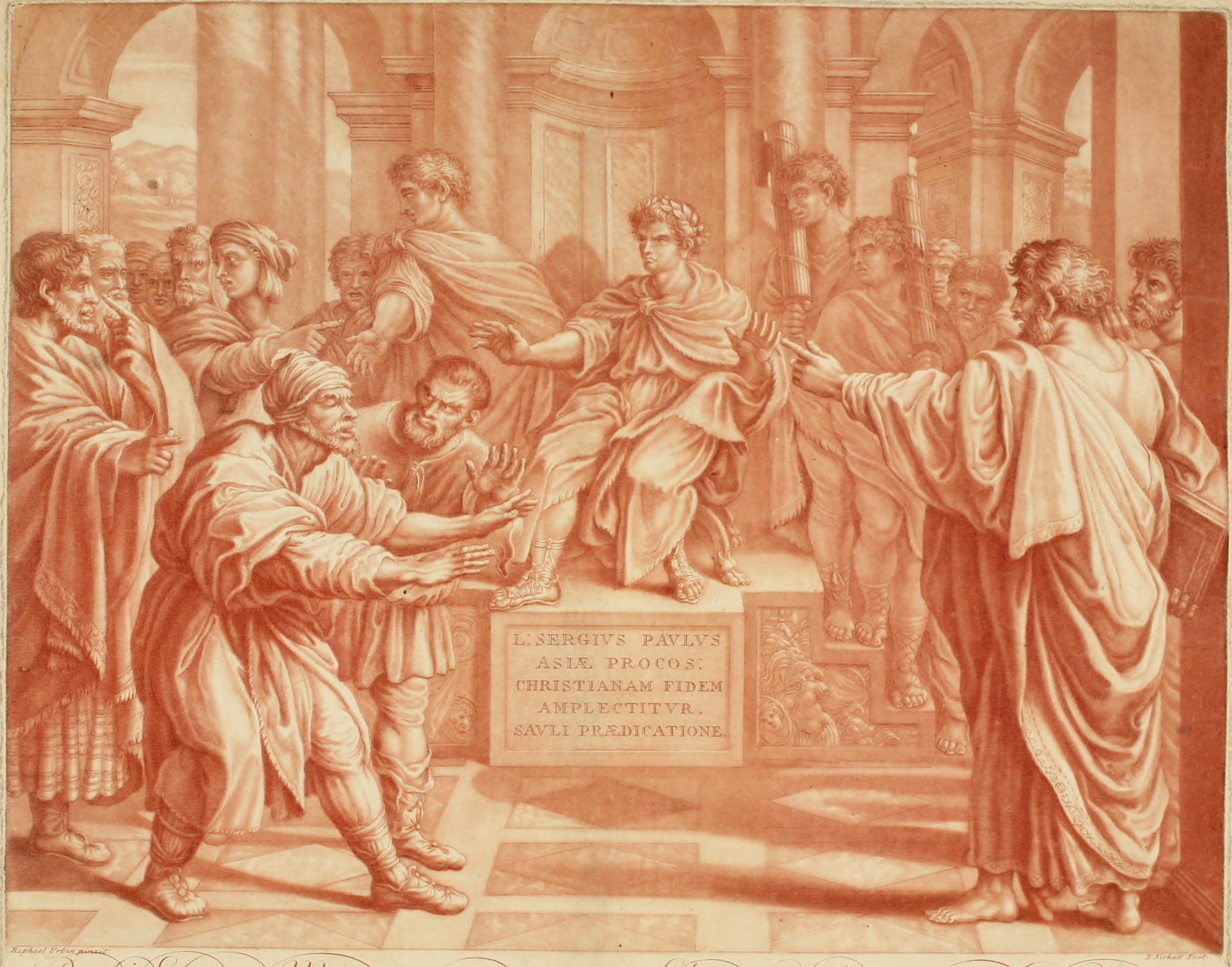
One of the seven Raphael Cartoons in Kirkall's 1722 mezzotint edition

Born in Sheffield, Kirkall was son of a locksmith. Around 1702 he came to London, and found employment in the book trade. He also studied drawing at Great Queen Street Academy.

Kirkall married early in life, to Elizabeth; a second wife was called Deborah. He died in Whitefriars in December 1742, leaving a son, Charles, then aged about 22.

== Works ==
As a book illustrator, Kirkall used etching and metalcut, with line engraving as "white line". From his first times in London, book ornaments he provided as raised metal proved very popular with publishers. In the 1720s he innovated with use of the mezzotint rocker tool to simulate chiaroscuro. A reputation for wood engraving was apparently based on misapprehensions, and the attribution to him of woodcuts in Samuel Croxall's edition of Æsop's Fables (1722) was guesswork.

Works included:

- The frontispiece to William Howell's Medulla Historiæ Anglicanæ (1712);
- Plates for Michel Maittaire's edition of the works of Terence (1713);
- Plates for the Tonson & Watts translation of Ovid's Metamorphoses (1717);
- Plates for Nicholas Rowe's translation of Lucan's Pharsalia (1718); and
- For Richard Bradley's The Gentleman and Gardener's Kalendar (1718).

His mezzotint engravings were often printed in green ink, and occasionally printed à la poupée in a variety of colours. In this manner he published by subscription sixteen views of shipping by William Van de Velde the younger, the seven Raphael Cartoons, hunting scenes by Johann Elias Ridinger, and other works.

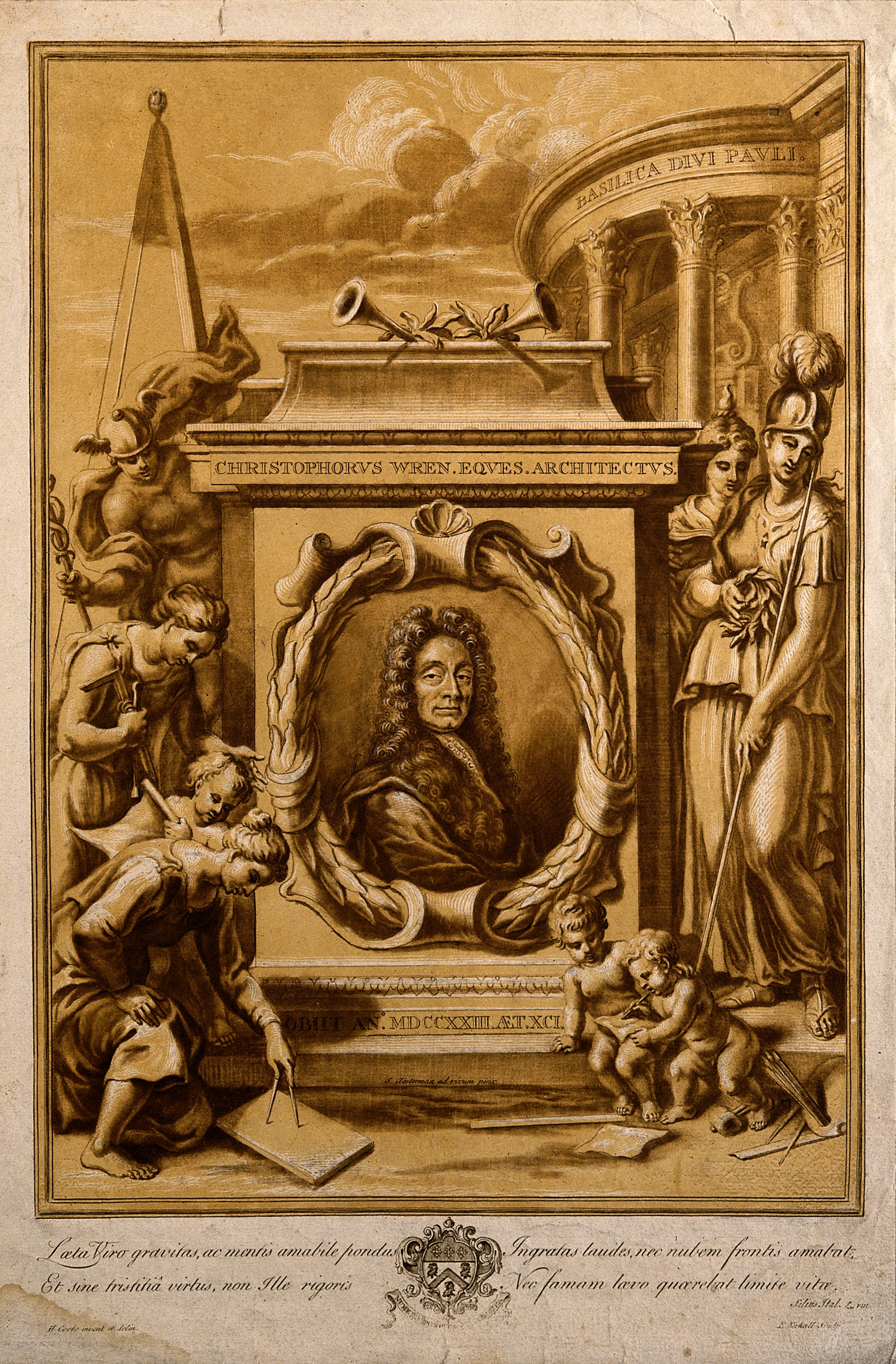
Chiaroscuro woodcut portrait of Sir Christopher Wren

With his new method of chiaroscuro engraving, Kirkall produced a copy of Ugo da Carpi's chiaroscuro engraving of Æneas and Anchises, after Raphael, and a number of reproductions of drawings by Italian masters. In a similar manner he engraved a portrait of Sir Christopher Wren by John Closterman, in an architectural frame designed by Henry Cook; and a portrait of William Stukeley for whose antiquarian works he engraved standard copperplates.

Later plates for the booksellers included:

- Those for Oldsworth and others' translation of Homer's Iliad (B. Lintot, 1734);
- Alexander Pope's translation of the same work (B. Lintot, 1736);
- The plates to an edition of Inigo Jones's Stonehenge (1725); and
- For James Gibbs's A Book of Architecture (1728), 73 plates.

A portrait by Kirkall of Eliza Haywood, prefixed to her Works in 1724, earned for him a couplet in Pope's Dunciad. After William Hogarth published in 1732 his major set of engravings The Harlot's Progress, Kirkall made free copies in mezzotint, printed in green, and published from his house in Dockwell's Court, Whitefriars, in November of that year.

Other engravings by Kirkall included:

- A mezzotint portrait of Senesino the singer, after Joseph Goupy;
- A set of thirty plates of flowers after Jacob Van Huysum;
- Plates of shipping after Thomas Baston; and
- Mezzotint plates after Peter Monamy.
