= Wendel Dietterlin =

German painter

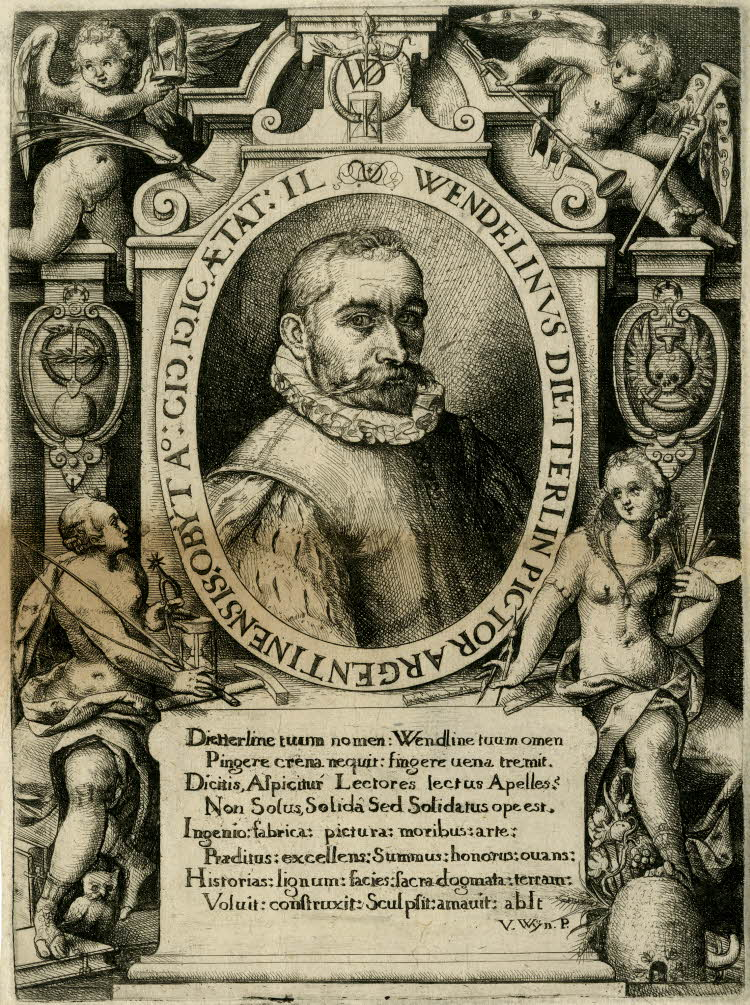
Print after his self-portrait

Wendel Dietterlin (c.1550–1599), sometimes Wendel Dietterlin the Elder, to distinguish him from his son, was a German mannerist painter, printmaker and architectural theoretician. Most of his paintings are now lost, and he is best known for his treatise on architectural ornament, Architectura, published in its final edition in Nuremberg in 1598.

== Life ==
Dietterlin was born at Pfullendorf in Württemberg; his original name was Grapp and he may have been a member of a family of artists in Swabia, spent most of his life in Strasbourg (then Strassburg), where he married Catharina Sprewer on 12 November 1570, and where he is known to have painted frescos for the Bruderhof, the Bishop's residence, in 1575, but he is later recorded in Hagenau in 1583 and in Oberkirch in 1589. He also worked on large projects in Stuttgart for some time (see below). He died in Strasbourg.

== Paintings ==
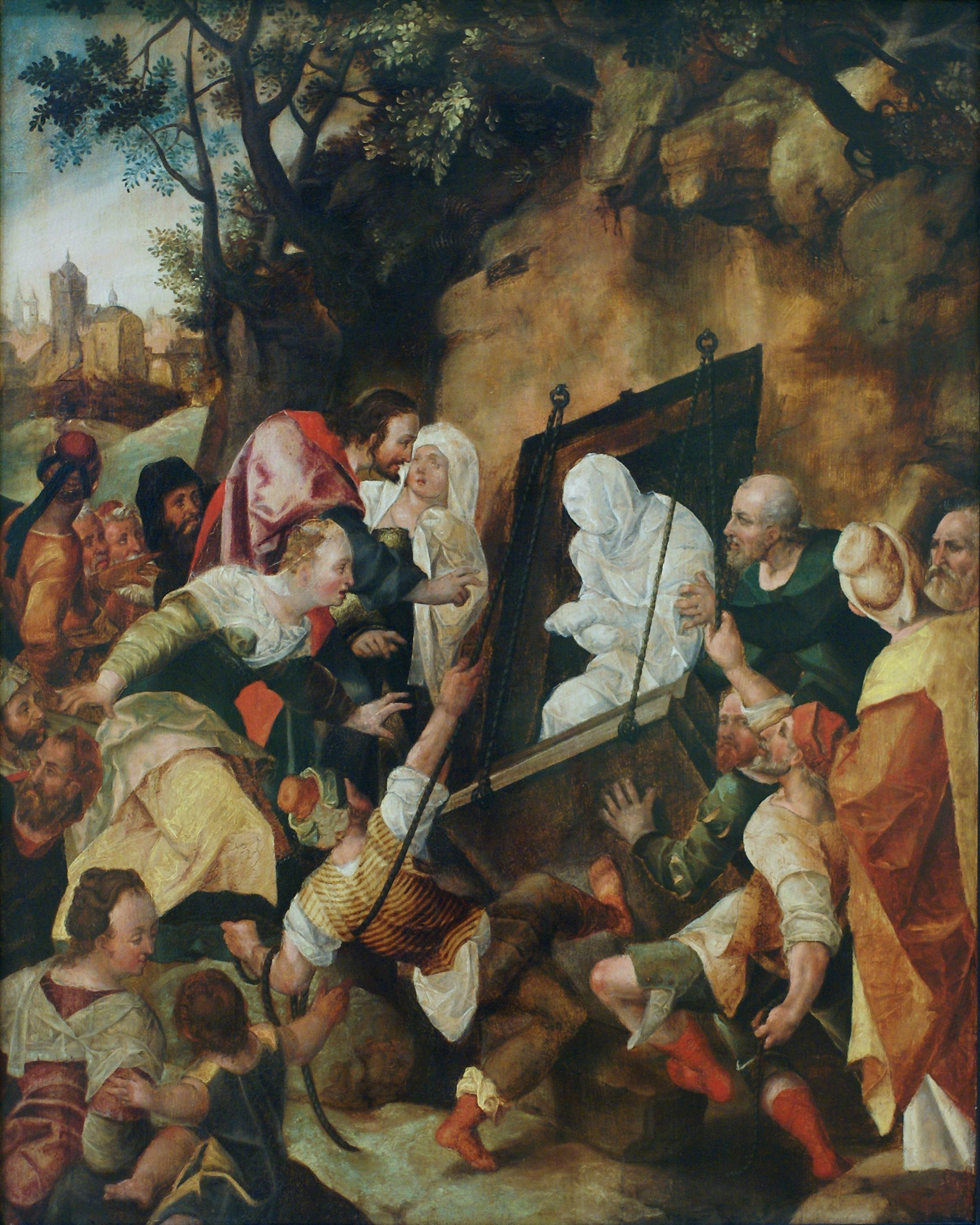
Resurrection of Lazarus, 1587, his only painting known to survive.

In Strasbourg, Dietterlin worked on the decoration of the Neuer Bau (currently the building of the Chambre de Commerce et d'Industrie) in 1589. Between 1590 and 1592 he was employed in Stuttgart with the execution of a large (57 metres long and 20 metres wide) ceiling painting in the upper hall of the Neues Lusthaus, a building constructed by Duke Ludwig of Württemberg for entertainment purposes. In addition to the ceiling, Dietterlin painted the walls of the hall. The Renaissance Lusthaus having later been rebuilt several times and almost entirely replaced in 1845 by the new Hoftheater (which was destroyed in a fire in 1902, when some of the remains of the original building came to light), nothing is now preserved of the paintings from the hall, but they are depicted in a 1619 etching by the Strasbourg-based painter and engraver Friedrich Brentel showing the interior of the large room.

Other of his paintings are known from engravings by Matthäus Greuter and by his own grandson Bartholomäus Dietterlin. The style, with "exaggerated foreshortenings", appears influenced by North Italian models, such as Giulio Romano's frescos in Mantua, through German intermediaries.

His only extant painting is a Resurrection of Lazarus (in the Staatliche Kunsthalle Karlsruhe), signed and dated 1582 or 1587.

== The Architectura ==
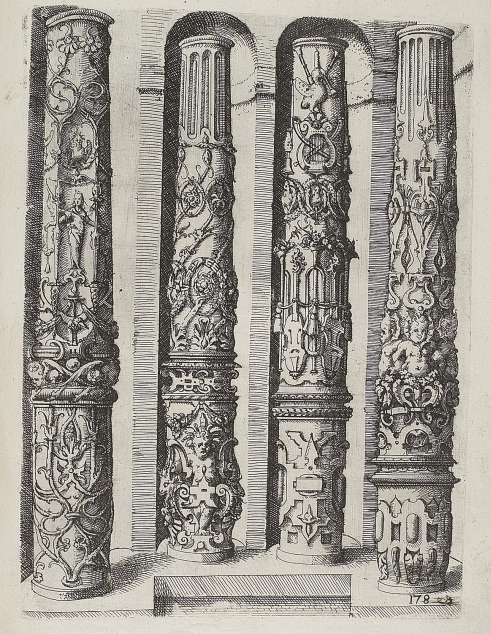
Columns of the Composite order in Wendel Dietterlin's version. From Architectura, plate 178.

Dietterlin's architectural treatise Architectvra: Von Außtheilung, Symmetria vnd Proportion der Fünff Seulen was first published in separate parts in 1593 and 1594, and finally in a combined and expanded edition in 1598. The book described the classical orders and their character and proper use, as was traditional in such books. Dietterlin, however, showed less interest in the proportions of the order than in their ornamentation. According to the architectural historian Torbjörn Fulton, Dietterlin treats the orders "more as a basis or excuse for the development of a bizarre ornamental fantasy than as didactic examples of classical architectural ornamentation". Like other theoreticians, he ascribed masculine and feminine qualities to the orders. In giving them an appropriate ornamentation that would agree with these qualities, he borrowed from older forms of ornament, including Gothic tracery. Dietterlin was dependent on many older models, and like other representatives of the Northern Renaissance (such as Hans Vredeman de Vries) he filled his surfaces with scrollwork, strapwork, gemshapes and grotesques. Dietterlin had Northern European contemporaries who likewise integrated Gothic elements in their designs, but he was unusual in the degree of blending of elements of different origin. While others kept Gothic elements clearly separate from Renaissance forms, Dietterlin would cover Renaissance elements in Gothic tracery or allow one to morph midway into the other.

== See also ==
- List of German painters

== Bibliography ==
=== Primary sources ===
- Dietterlin, Wendel: Architectvra: Von Außtheilung, Symmetria vnd Proportion der Fünff Seulen, und aller darauß volgender Kunst Arbeit, von Fenstern, Caminen .... Nürnberg, 1598
- All the editions on line, website "Architectura".

=== Secondary sources ===
- von Borries, J. E.: "Brentel [Brändel; Brendel], Friedrich, I", Grove Art Online. Retrieved on 26 December 2008.
- Fulton, Torbjörn: Stuckarbeten i svenska byggnadsmiljöer från äldre Vasatid [Stucco decoration in Swedish architectural settings of the early Vasa period], (Ars Suetica, 16.) Uppsala: Uppsala University, 1994. ISBN 91-554-3332-4
- Heck, Michèle-Caroline, "Dietterlin, Wendel [Grapp, Wendling]", Grove Art Online. Retrieved on 26 December 2008.
- Lambert, A.: "Das ehemalige Lusthaus in Stuttgart", Schweizerische Bauzeitung, Vol. 41/42 (1903), pp. 41–43
- Martin, Kurt, "Dietterlin, Wendel", Neue Deutsche Biographie 3 (Berlin 1957), pp. 702–703.
