= Cocorico (magazine) =

First cover of Cocorico by artist Alphonse Mucha in 1898.

Cocorico was a French magazine first published in 1898. It was produced by the artist Paul-Émile Boutigny and featured many artists of the Art Nouveau movement including Alphonse Mucha and Théophile Steinlen. The magazine had 63 issues.
