= Cork General Post Office =

Cork's General Post Office

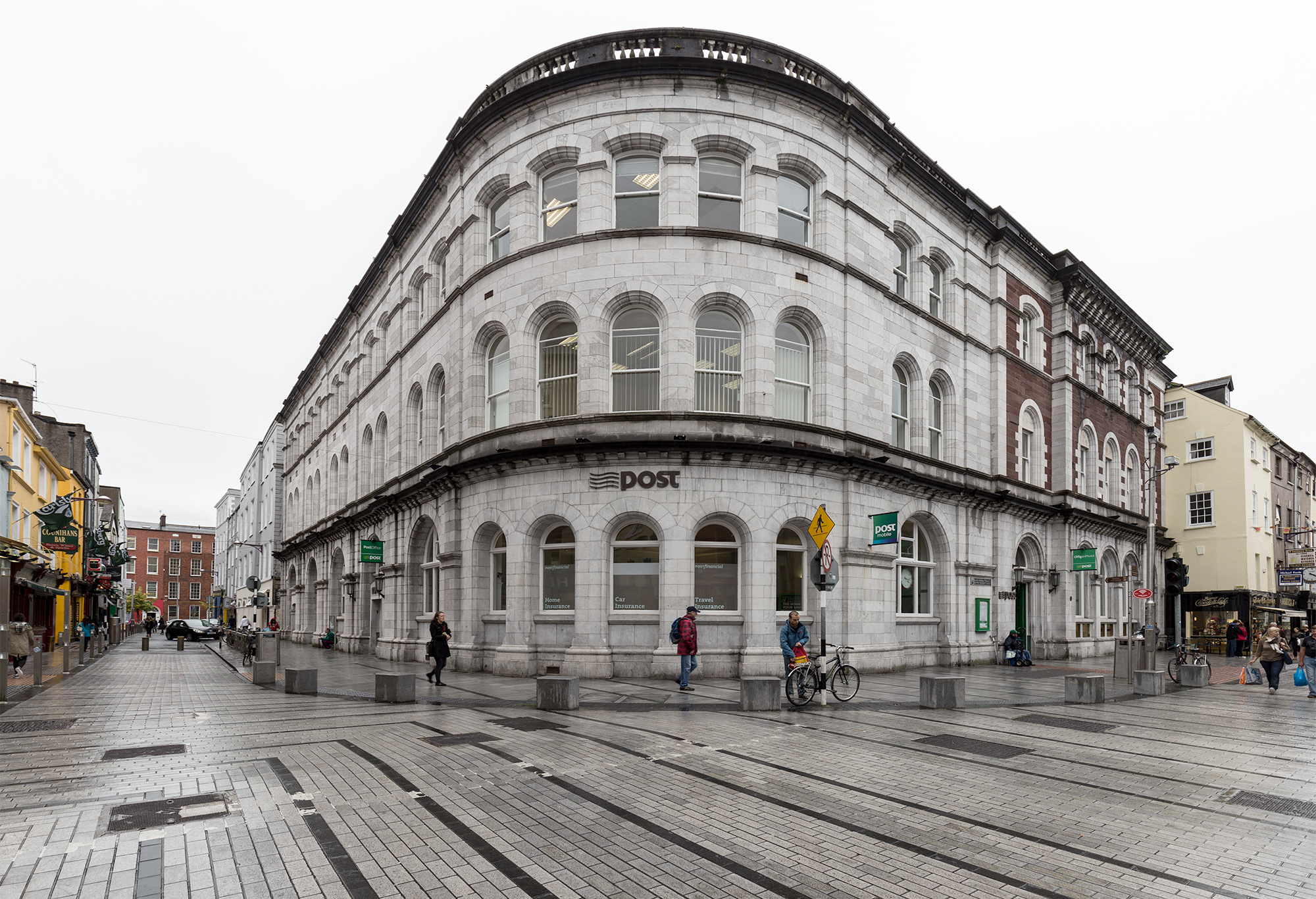
- General Post Office building with Pembroke Street extending to the left, and Oliver Plunkett Street to the right

- Location within Ireland

General information
- Status: Government office building
- Type: Office
- Location: Cork, County Cork, Ireland
- Coordinates: 51.89791°N 8.47037°W
- Completed: 1877

Technical details
- Material: sandstone and limestone

Cork General Post Office (GPO) is a historic post office building in Oliver Plunkett Street in Cork, Ireland. Built on the site of an older theatre, it is one of the few An Post offices in Ireland which still retains the General Post Office moniker from the times when the Irish postal service was under the governance of the British General Post Office. The post office is one of Oliver Plunkett Street's most prominent buildings, and is listed as a protected structure.

== Theatre ==
The building dates back to the 17th century. In late 18th century, it was the site of the Theatre Royal, established by Spranger Barry, initially as the George's Theatre (at that time at the address 29 George's Street). It was modelled after the Crow Street Theatre, and first opened on 21 July 1760, with the play "The Orphans". That first theatre, including wardrobes and orchestral instruments, burnt down on 1 April 1840, and a second one — by then renamed Theatre Royal — was built in the same place and opened on 8 June 1853. Following a redesign by John Benson and extension works in late 1860s, it was able to accommodate an audience of 2,000 people.

== Post office ==
The theatre burnt down again in 1873, and in 1875 it was sold to the Irish Postal Service which reopened the building as the GPO in 1877 following a redesign by James Higgins Owens. The modern building is a three-storey Edwardian structure curving from the Oliver Plunkett Street to Pembroke Street, built of sandstone and limestone, with round headed door openings. Many of the original elements were retained, including the red sandstone on upper floors visible today from the Oliver Plunkett Street side. The re-purposing of the building was commemorated by a witty rhyme later noted by the Irish Examiner in 1930:

The old theatre has been sold,
Dick Burke ranks with betters,
Tinsel now has turned to gold,
And literature to 'letters'.

In 1890, the Cork post office employed 24 postmen and 15 sorting clerks, and in 1938 the numbers increased to over 100 and 35 respectively.

In 1901, a report was read in the presence of city officials, detailing the very poor state of fire safety at the GPO, including most notably the lack of an external fire hydrant, and only one door leading out of the building where parcel, instrument, sorting and other offices are situated, and where "men are continuously smoking". Nevertheless, the building's fire extinguishing equipment was used to help fight the fires during the burning of Cork in 1920.

In 1905 the building was further extended by T. J. Mellon.

In 1931, the sorting and customs work was moved from the GPO to a block of buildings on St Patrick's Quay to make room for the telephone exchange which was moved from its location on the South Mall. This development required laying of cables and making structural alternations as well as installing of the exchange apparatus.

In 1952, the office was renovated, including the installation of artistic mahogany paneling, new floor panels and plastic counters, as well as new lighting. The renovated building was officially opened by E. Childers, at that time the Minister for Posts and Telegraphs.

Between 1987 and 1988, the GPO was renovated again at the cost of 600,000 pounds. Changes included reclaiming for the use of the postmaster and his staff (until now located at the South Mall) of the space previously occupied by Bord Telecom telephonists who, in turn, were moved to the Churchfield exchange. The counter/teller area was redone too. During the refurbishment, temporary post office services were provided on Winthrop Street.

Yet another renovation was carried out between 2004 and 2005, in preparation for Cork's reign as the European Capital of Culture. The facade was cleaned and painted, and the roof repaired. The interior was also re-carpeted to remove the effect of the recent flooding.

== Significance ==
Situated in the strict centre of Cork, until at least mid 1960s the GPO served as the central point for outlining boundaries of various legislations pertaining to the city of Cork. As an example, all butchers within 6.4 km (4 mi) of the GPO were advised to adhere to new opening hours policies.

In addition to its role as a post office, today the GPO is a recognisable meeting point in the busy Oliver Plunkett Street. Passers-by will often hear the calls of The Echo seller who has his pitch there, and in Christmas season an electrically lit figure of a Santa Claus, is put up by the city in the small square in front of the building.
