= Walter Berwick =

Irish judge

Walter Berwick (1800–1868) was an Irish judge, who perished in the Abergele rail disaster of 1868. He was a much loved public figure, especially in Cork, where he is commemorated by the Berwick Fountain on the Grand Parade in Cork city. He presided over the official inquiry into the Dolly's Brae conflict in 1849.

== Early life ==
He was born in Leixlip, County Kildare, younger son of the Reverend Edward Berwick (1750–1820), vicar of Leixlip, by his first wife Anne Bermingham of Monkstown, Dublin. His mother, a niece of Henry Grattan, died shortly after his birth. Two years later his father remarried Rebecca Shuldham, daughter of Pooley Shuldham of Ballymulvey, County Longford, and had at least two more children, Elizabeth Mary Berwick (died 1868) and Edward Berwick, President of Queen's College, Galway, from 1849 to 1877.

He was educated at Trinity College Dublin and was Treasurer of the College Historical Society from 1823 to 1831. He entered Gray's Inn in 1823, was called to the Irish Bar in 1826 and became Queen's Counsel in 1840. He became Third Serjeant in 1855 and Second Serjeant in 1858. He became a Bencher of the King's Inn in 1856.

== Battle of Dolly's Brae ==
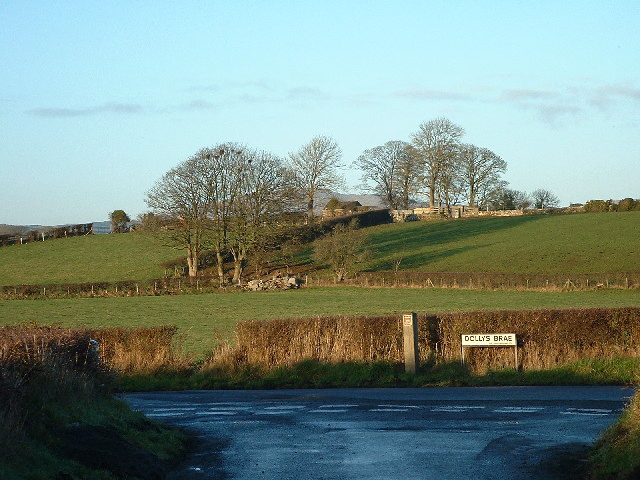
Dolly's Brae, the site of serious civil unrest in 1849, which prompted an official inquiry chaired by Walter Berwick

On 12 July 1849, the long-standing tensions between the Orange Order and the local Roman Catholic community in south County Down erupted into a skirmish, following an Orange Order march at Dolly's Brae, near Rathfriland, in which several people were killed (the official count was about thirty deaths, though this figure has been disputed). The incident is generally called the Dolly's Brae conflict, or the Battle of Dolly's Brae. The public outcry over the deaths led to the establishment of a Government inquiry which Berwick chaired. His report was highly critical of the local magistrates, especially Lord Roden, for failing to prevent the violence. As a result, three magistrates, including Roden, were removed from the Bench. The inquiry also led to the enactment of the Party Processions Act 1850, which prohibited all political processions in Ireland. The measure proved to be equally unpopular with all political parties and was repealed in 1872.

== Cork: the Berwick Fountain ==
For several years he was the Assistant Barrister for the East Riding of County Cork, which in effect meant that he was the Chairman of the Court of Quarter Sessions for Cork. He acquired a reputation for integrity and impartiality, and became a much-loved figure in Cork. He was one of the first judges to expound the notion of the suspended sentence. When he was made judge of the Irish Court of Bankruptcy in 1859, the people of Cork paid a heartfelt tribute to his good service to the city. Berwick, greatly touched by the tribute, responded by commissioning the Berwick Fountain "in remembrance of the great kindness shown to me by all classes in Cork". Built by Sir John Benson, Cork's leading architect, it was completed in 1860 and still stands on the Grand Parade, although it was moved from its original site in 2007. Berwick served as the Bankruptcy judge until his death. In his last years, he lived at St. Edmundsbury, Lucan, Dublin. He was a founder member of the Stephen's Green Club, and an active campaigner for the establishment of the National Gallery of Ireland.

== Death: the Abergele rail disaster ==
In August 1868 Berwick and his sister Elizabeth Mary were returning from a holiday in Switzerland. At Euston Station they took charge of a young girl called Louisa Symes, who was apparently a distant relative. They boarded the Irish Mail to Holyhead. At Abergele in North Wales, two runaway carriages from a goods train ahead crashed into the Irish Mail, causing what was then the worst train disaster in British history. In the resulting inferno, 33 people died, including Berwick, his sister and Louisa Symes. All the victims were buried in a common grave, and a memorial was erected to commemorate the disaster.

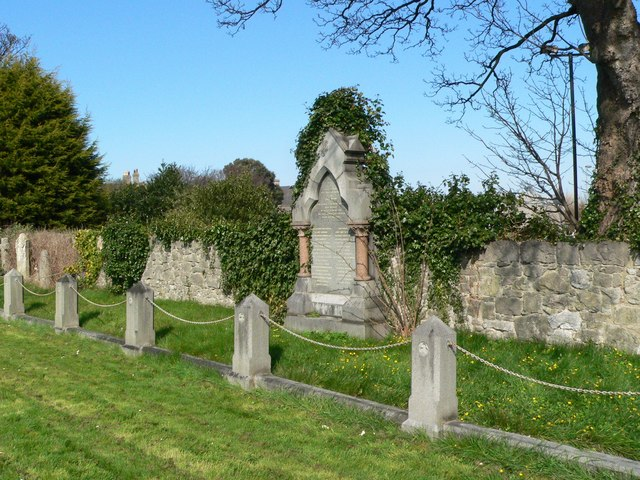
Memorial to the 33 people who died in the Abergele Train Disaster, among whom were Walter Berwick and his sister Elizabeth Mary Berwick.

== See also ==
- Abergele rail disaster
- Dolly's Brae conflict
- Grand Parade, Cork
- Party Processions Act

== Sources ==
- British Almanack and Companion 1869
- Hart, A. R. History of the King's Serjeant-at-law in Ireland Four Courts Press Dublin 2000
- Murphy, David "Walter Berwick" Dictionary of Irish Biography
- National Inventory of Architectural Heritage
- Report by Walter Berwick QC to the Lord Lieutenant of Ireland on the occurrence at Dolly's Brae, 22 September 1849
- Samuels, Arthur Purefoy Irwin, editor The Early Life, Correspondence and Writings of the Right Honourable Edmund Burke 1923
- The Times, 27 August 1868.
