= Macnamara Morgan =

Macnamara Morgan (c.1720–1762) was an Irish playwright, poet, and barrister.

== Life ==
He was born in Dublin, was called to the bar in 1744, and practised at Dublin. In the 1740s he started to have his plays performed.

He is best remembered for writing the tragedy Philoclea which premiered at Covent Garden on 22 January 1754. The play was heavily influenced by his friend Spranger Barry and based on Philip Sidney’s Arcadia and it was presented for nine nights. Maria Nossiter took the lead role in Philoclea and it was said that the play had been "brought forward and wrote purposely to show her to advantage by McNamara Morgan".

Morgan also wrote the pastoral comedy The Sheep-Shearing or Florizel and Perdita, which premiered in Dublin in 1747 at the Smock Alley Theatre and was subsequently revived at Covent Garden in 1754. The work is based on William Shakespeare's The Winter's Tale, contained music by Thomas Arne and was published in 1767.
