= Theatre Royal, Cork =

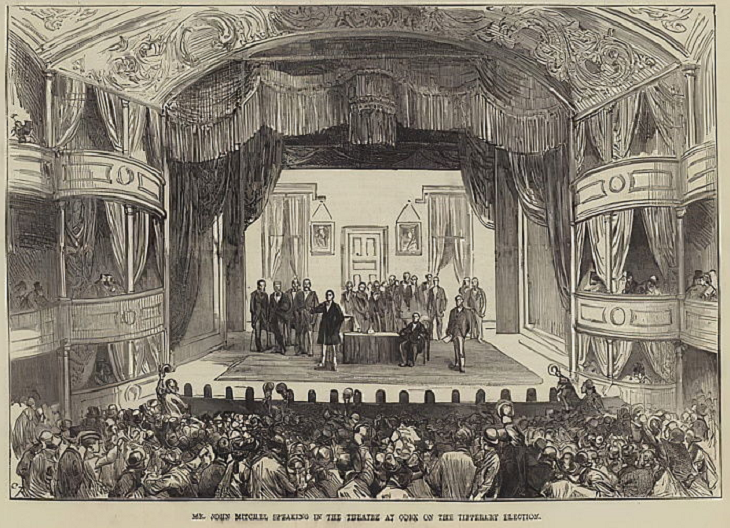
- John Mitchel speaking at the Theatre Royal in Cork in early 1875

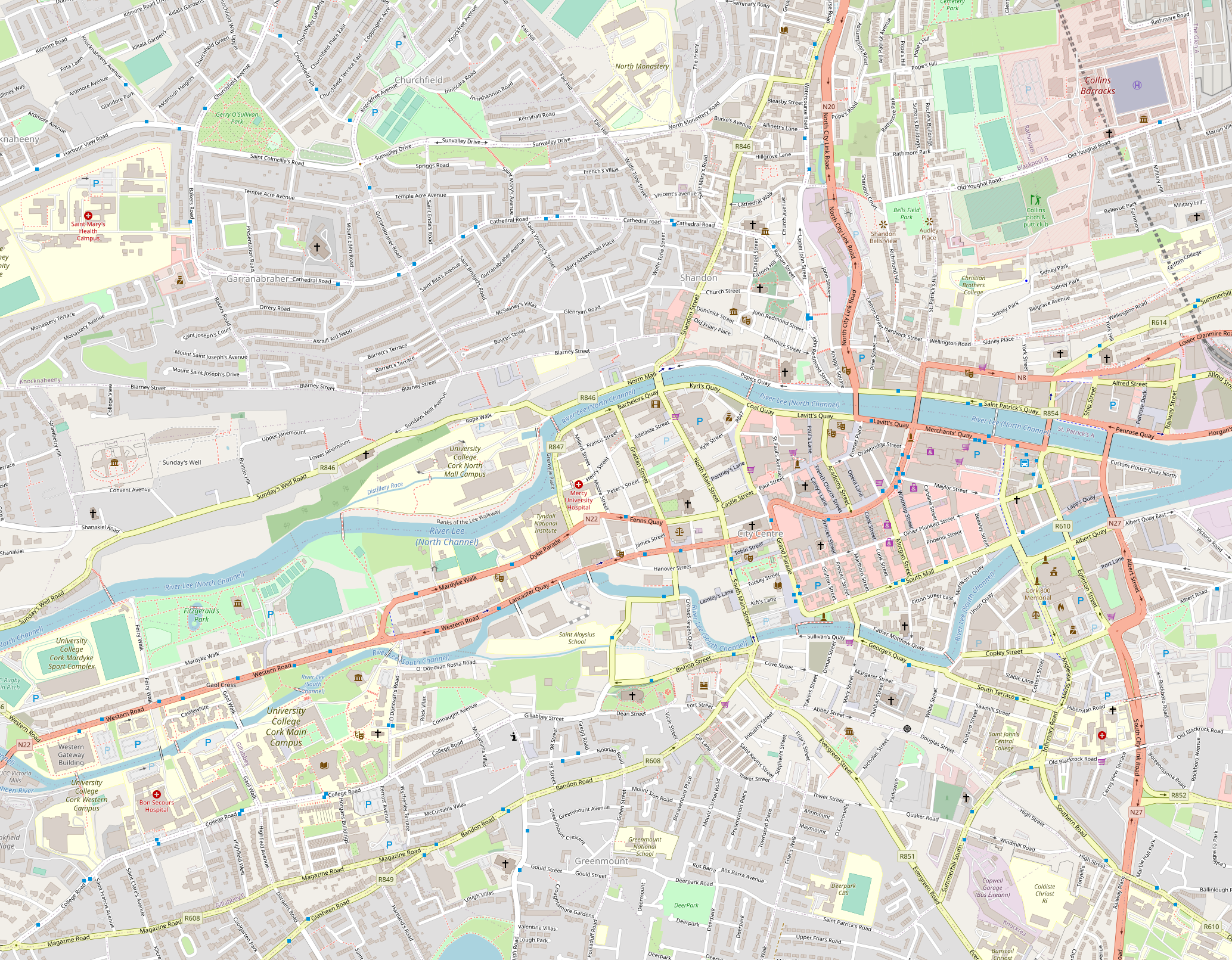
- Location within Cork Central
- Address: George's Street (now Oliver Plunkett Street); Cork; Ireland
- Coordinates: 51.8978°N 8.4705°W
- Capacity: 2,000
- Type: patent theatre
- Current use: General Post Office

Construction
- Opened: 1760
- Closed: 1875
- Rebuilt: 1853
- Years active: 1760–1840; 1867–75

The Theatre Royal was a patent theatre located in Cork City, Ireland.

== History ==
The Theatre Royal had already existed in 1750s, but it was moved from its original location near today's Princes Street to the Pembroke Street building by the local actor Spranger Barry in 1760. It was modelled on the Crow Street Theatre, Dublin. In 1766 when he left for London, Barry controversially left his son Thomas Barry as manager of the theatre, but his tenure lasted for less than a year.

The theatre was destroyed by fire on April Fool's Day 1840. In 1853 it was rebuilt, and in the 1860s it was refurbished under the direction of Sir John Benson, and re-opened on 26 December 1867.

In 1875 the theatre was sold to the postal service and Cork's GPO opened on the site in 1877. The last three plays performed were James Sheridan Knowles' Virginius; William Shakespeare's Hamlet; and John Wilson's Belphegor.

== Description ==
An 1867 description from the Illustrated London News:

The theatre is constructed to hold two thousand persons, and is divided into two tiers of boxes, a capacious pit, stalls, private boxes, and a spacious gallery, from which latter “coign of vantage” an excellent view of the stage is afforded, while the tenants of the boxes are screened from the view of the gods – an important consideration in a town where gallery criticism is often extended unceremoniously to the well-dressed class of visitors.
