= Grand Parade, Cork =

Street in Cork, Ireland

Grand Parade
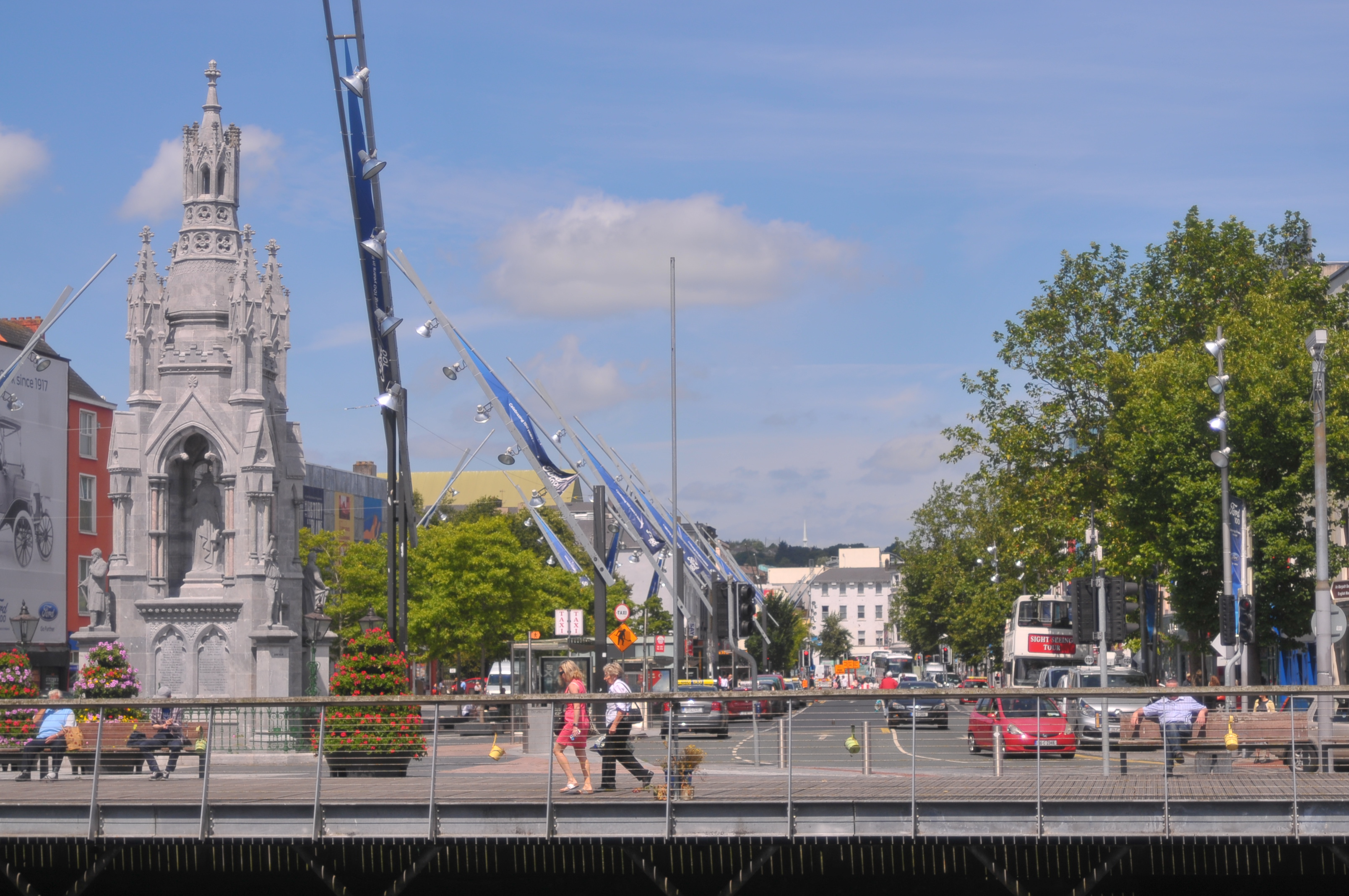
- Looking north on Grand Parade, 2017

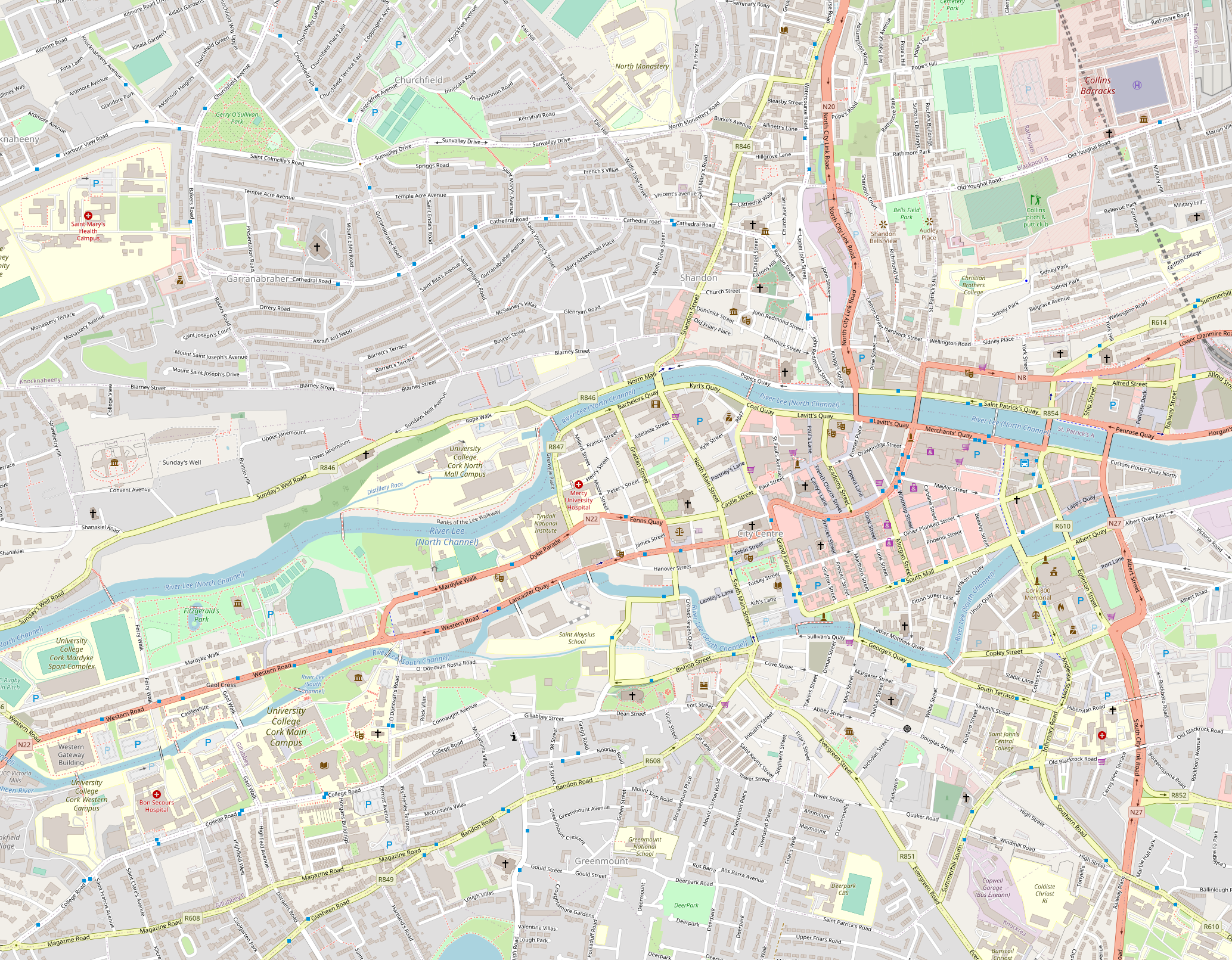
- Location within Cork Central
- Native name: Sráid an Chapaill Bhuí (Irish)
- Length: 280 m (920 ft)
- Width: up to 45 metres (148 ft)
- Location: Cork, Ireland
- Postal code: T12
- Coordinates: 51.89755°N 8.47513°W
- north end: St. Patrick's Street
- south end: South Mall

Other
- Known for: The National Monument, Capitol Cinema, Bishop Lucey Park

Grand Parade is one of the main streets of Cork city, Ireland. It runs from South Mall in the south to St. Patrick's Street/Daunt Square in the north, with intersections with Oliver Plunkett Street, Tuckey Street, Washington Street, Augustine Street and a number of pedestrian-only lanes in between. The Irish name of the street, Sráid an Chapaill Bhuí ("Yellow Horse Street"), comes from a time when there was a statue of King George II on horse-back at the junction with South Mall. The location of this statue is now occupied by the national monument.

== History ==
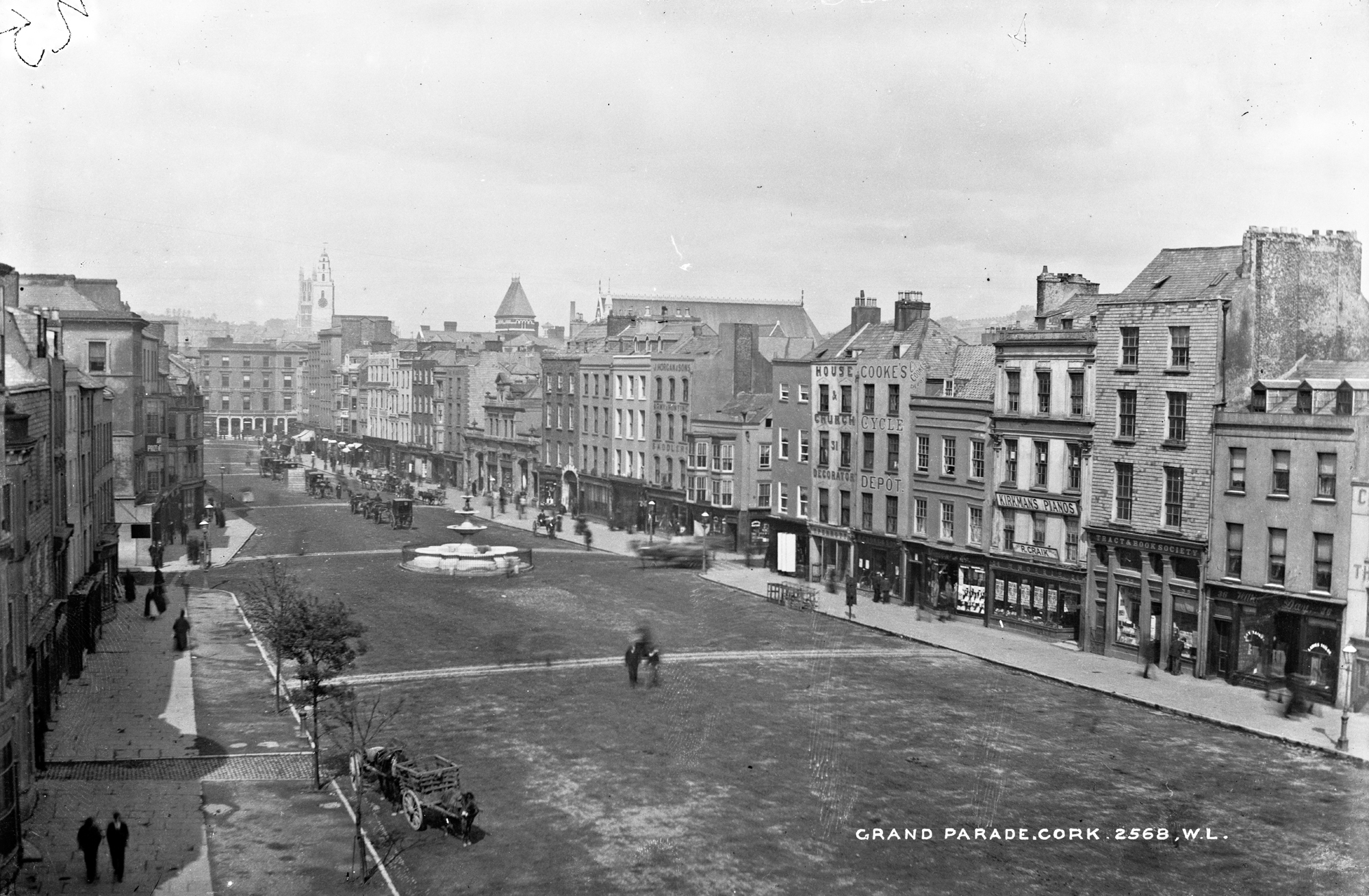
View of the Grand Parade c. 1890.

Grand Parade was originally a channel of the River Lee. The original Hiberno-Norse settlement of Cork grew up on its west bank.

The river channel existed until at least 1690, when it is shown on a map of Cork. At this time, the east bank was still largely undeveloped, with only a bowling green shown in the area.

By 1726, buildings had developed on the east bank, but the river channel remained in place. In a 1774 map, the northern portion of the street between Oliver Plunkett Street and Daunt Square had been reclaimed, but the southern portion was still a dock. Finally, by 1801, the river channel had completely disappeared and the street was fully present.

== Today ==
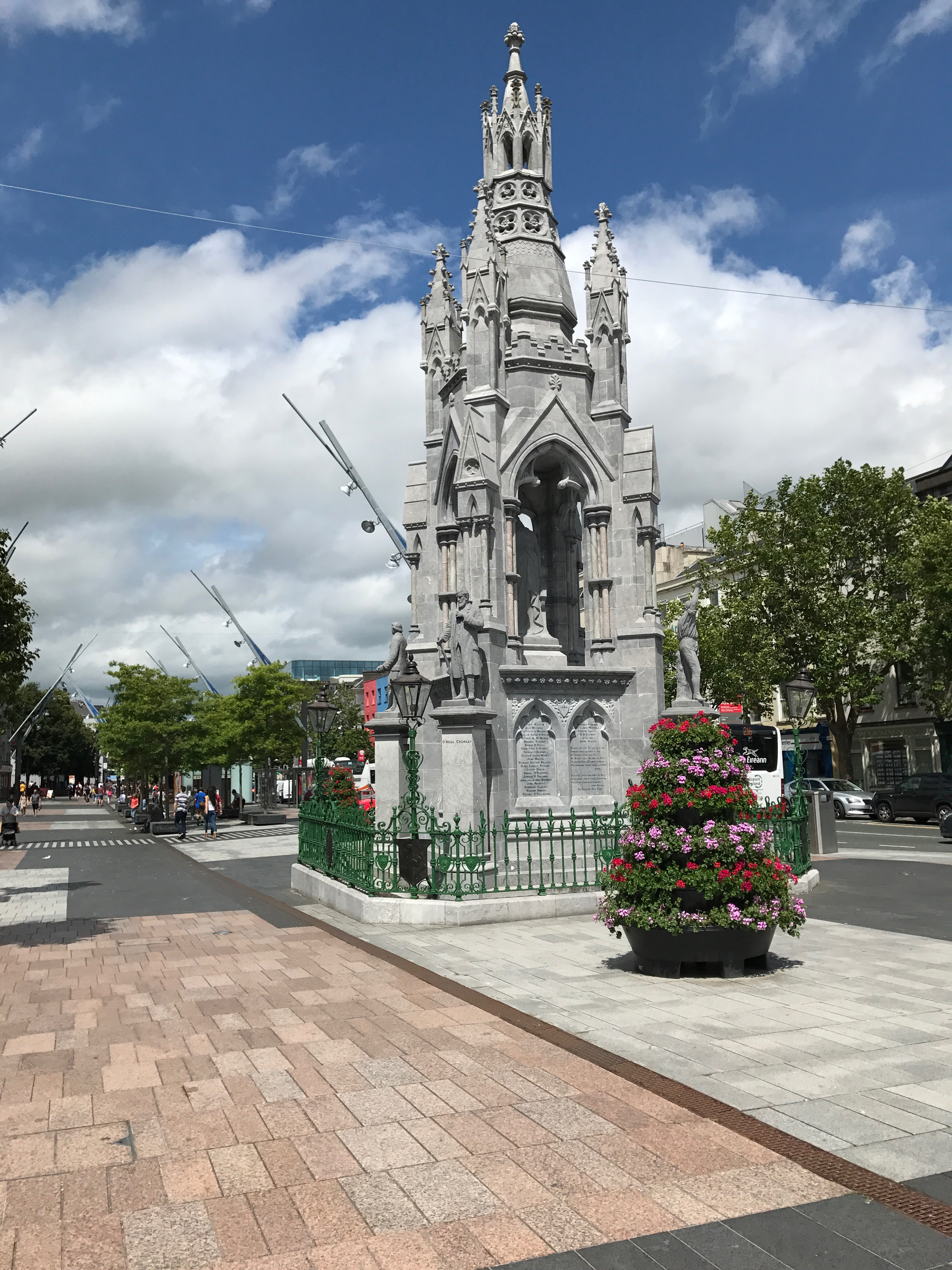
The National Monument on the south end of the street in 2017

In 2010, some members of the Cork City Council had "raised concerns about the shabby state of several city centre sites" on Grand Parade - including the former Capitol Cinema site. From 2016, these sites have seen renewed development and investment.

The street retains a number of commercial properties, with retail being most common at the northern end of the street and offices more common at the southern end close to the South Mall. It has an entrance to the English Market on its eastern side. Other features on the street include Cork's main library and Bishop Lucey Park, both of which are on the western side of the street, and the mid-19th century Berwick Fountain - which was originally in the centre of the street, but which was moved to the western side during later refurbishment works. It was commissioned by the popular and respected Judge Walter Berwick, on the occasion of his departure from Cork, "in rememberance(sic) of the great kindness shown to him by all classes in [Cork]".

In December 2015, planning permission was granted for the redevelopment of the former Capitol Cinema site, and demolition began in April 2016. This included the demolition of the Capitol Cinema building and adjacent Central Shoe Store, as well as some stores located behind, allowing for a 100,000sq foot building stretching from Grand Parade to St Patrick's Street. It was announced in March 2017 that tenants would include Lifestyle Sports, Homesense, Facebook, AlienVault and Huawei, the building, named 'The Capitol' opened in June 2017.

== Popular culture ==
The Grand Parade is the name of an album by Cork band The Frank and Walters.

== See also ==
- List of public art in Cork
