= Oliver Plunkett Street =

Street in central Cork, Ireland

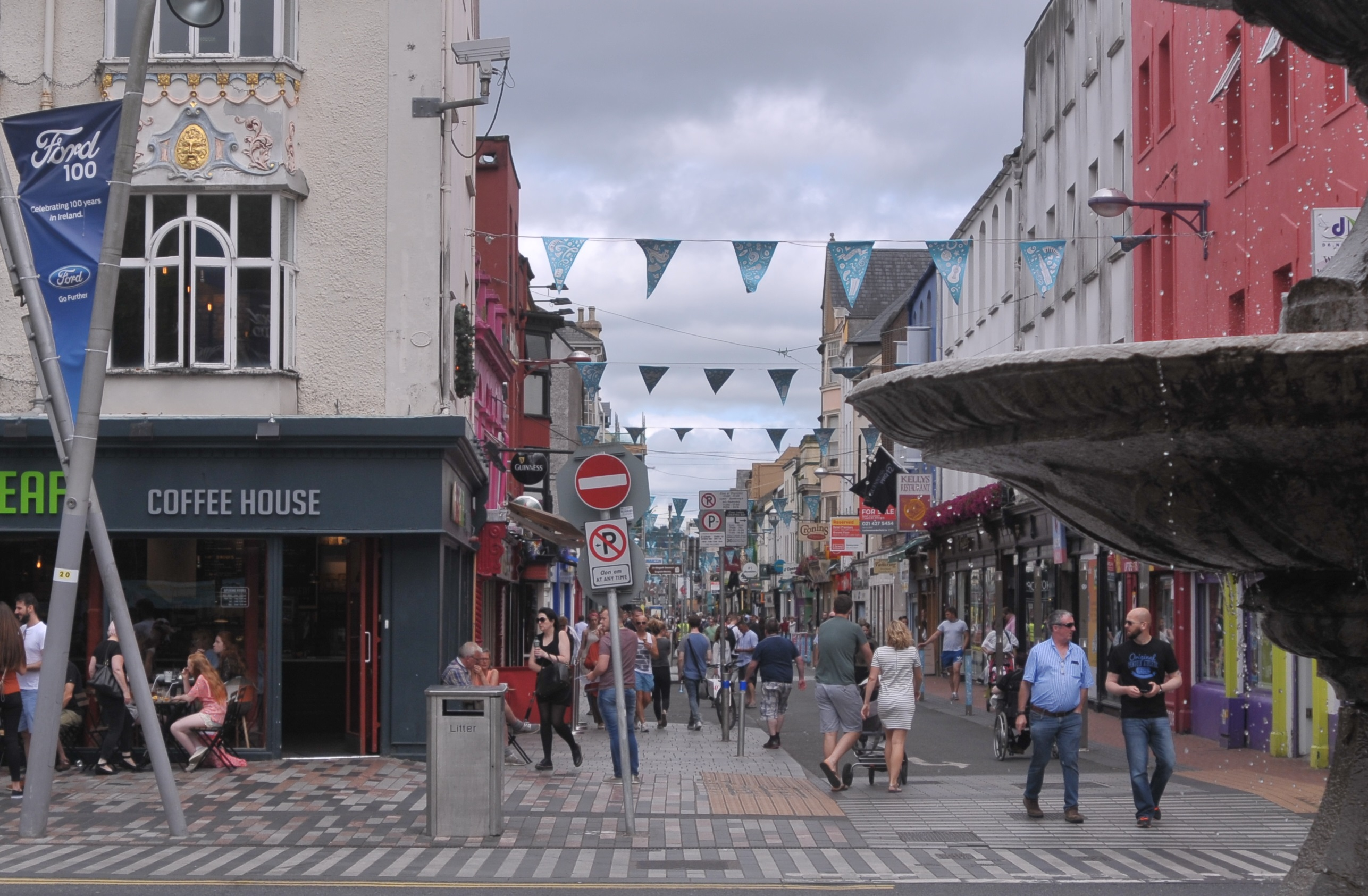
- Oliver Plunkett Street looking east from Grand Parade

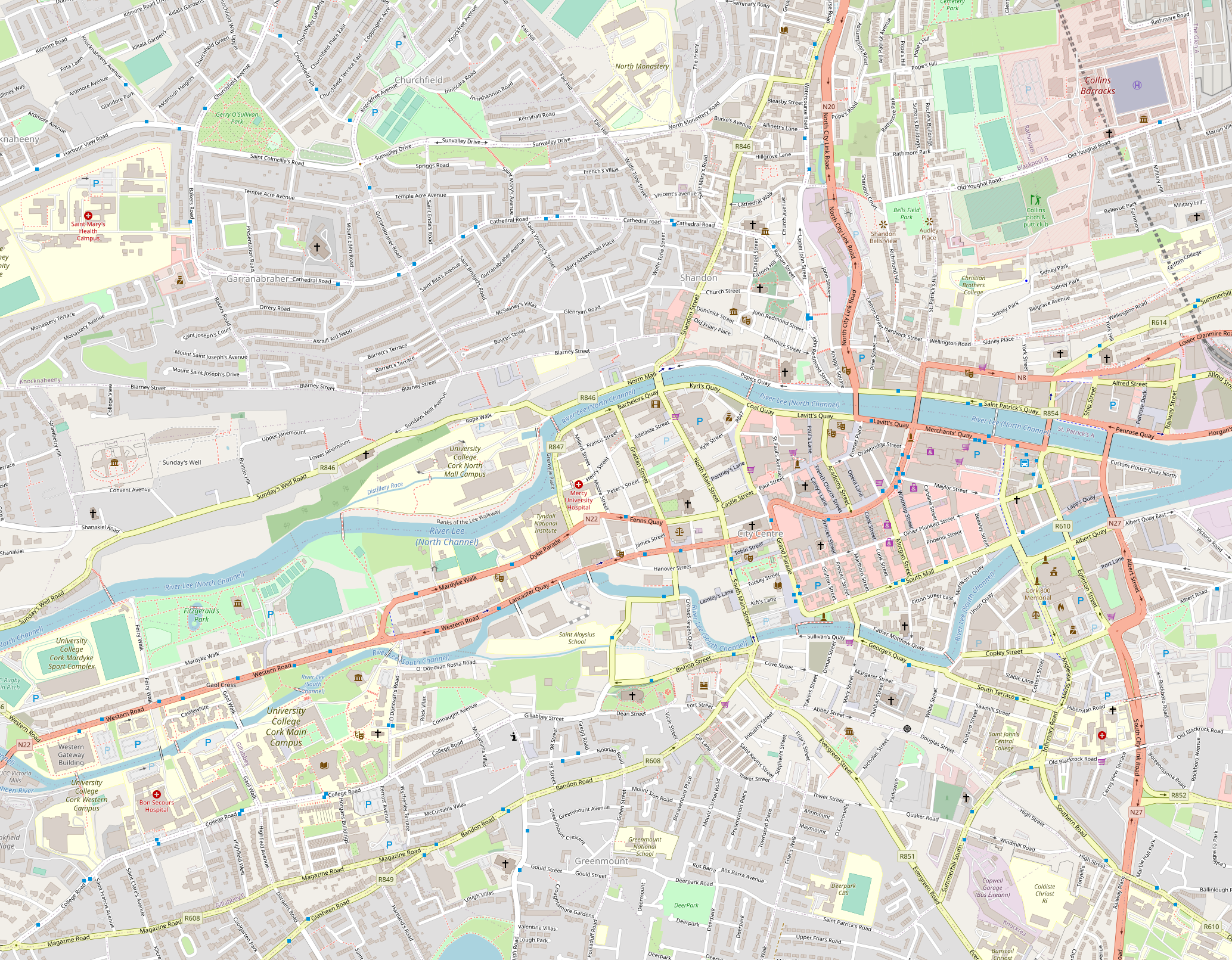
- Location within Cork Central
- Native name: Sráid Oilibhéir Pluincéid (Irish)
- Former name: George's Street
- Namesake: Oliver Plunkett
- Length: 550 m (1,800 ft)
- Width: 11 metres (36 ft)
- Location: Cork, Ireland
- Postal code: T12
- Coordinates: 51.898°N 8.4705°W
- east end: Parnell Place
- west end: Grand Parade

Other
- Known for: 'Great Street Award' 2016, restaurants, shops
- Status: Pedestrian priority

Oliver Plunkett Street (Irish: Sráid Olibhéir Pluincéid) is a shopping street in Cork, Ireland. It was originally laid-out in the early 18th century as the city expanded eastwards beyond the original city walls.

== History ==
At the start of the 18th century, Oliver Plunkett Street was the first street built east of the Grand Parade in the area then known as the East Marsh or Dunscombe Marsh. It was originally named George's Street after George I, the then reigning King of Great Britain and Ireland. In 1920, during the Burning of Cork, large parts of the street were destroyed by British troops.

After the establishment of the Irish Free State, the street was renamed after Oliver Plunkett, a 17th-century martyr and Roman Catholic Archbishop of Armagh. The name change was gradual and as late as 1945, business directories still contained a reference to 'Late George's Street'. Cork's lowest-lying street, at 4 metres above sea level, the street is prone to periodic flooding when the River Lee bursts its banks.

In 2004 a public realm improvement project was undertaken on the street. It was designed by Beth Gali, and cost €3.8 million.

== Location and use ==
The street runs in a straight line from Custom House Street to Grand Parade. Other streets lead off from Oliver Plunkett Street in a grid pattern, such as Prince's Street, Cook Street, and Smith Street. With 15 streets on both sides of Oliver Plunkett Street, there are a number of access points to the street from St. Patrick's Street to the north and the South Mall to the south.

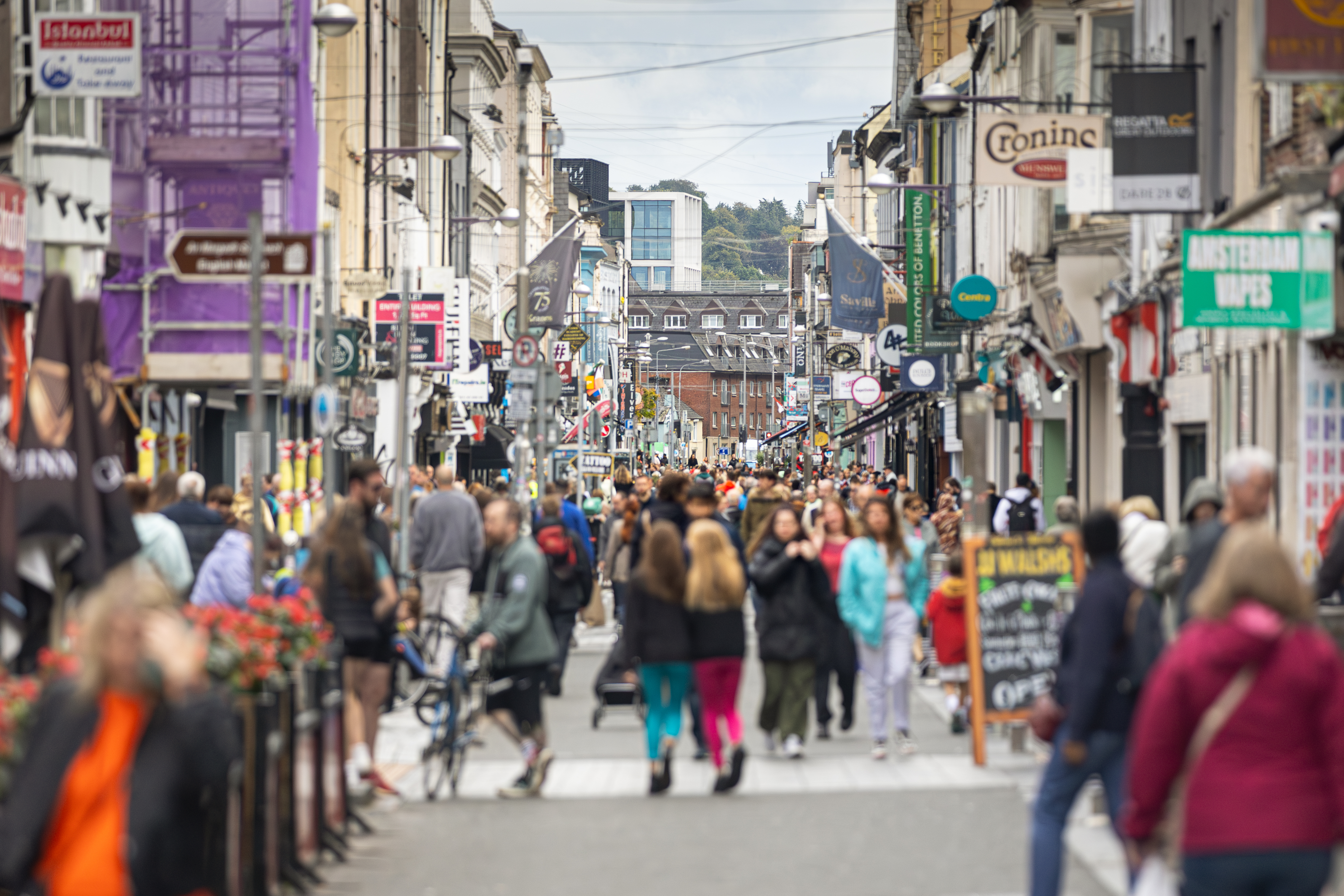
People on Oliver Plunkett Street on a Saturday morning

Between Grand Parade and Parnell Place, the street is a shopping street. This section of the street is also home to Cork's General Post Office. A small lane, known as Market Lane, provides access to the English Market. There are over one hundred independent retailers on the street, many of which have been family-owned for several generations.

It is also one of a number of nightlife centres in Cork - although there are more bars and restaurants on the neighbouring side streets than on Oliver Plunkett Street itself.

Between Parnell Place and Custom House Quay, the east end of the street is known as Oliver Plunkett Street Lower.

== Pedestrianisation ==
Princes Street, a small street which connects Oliver Plunkett Street to St. Patrick's Street, was the first street to be pedestrianised in Ireland in 1971. Further streets adjoining Oliver Plunkett Street were pedestrianised in 1976.

While the pedestrianisation of Oliver Plunkett Street was suspended as part of the initial COVID-19 pandemic restrictions in Ireland, this was reversed in May 2020. In the same month it was announced that the temporary pedestrianisation of Pembroke Street would be examined. By June 2020, the Reimagining Cork programme was launched. It included the pedestrianisation of several streets off Oliver Plunkett Street, including Princes Street, Pembroke Street and Caroline Street. By September 2020 this had been made permanent.

By 2021, the hours in which cars were forbidden in the Oliver Plunkett Street area had been extended to 11am to 4am. As of 2024, all streets leading off Oliver Plunkett Street - towards St Patricks Street and South Mall - are pedestrianised from 11am to 4am. Oliver Plunkett Street Lower, however, is open to vehicular traffic.

== Awards ==
The street won the 'Great Street Award', awarded by London's Academy of Urbanism, in 2016.
