= Bishop Lucey Park =

Park in Cork, Ireland

- The People's Park
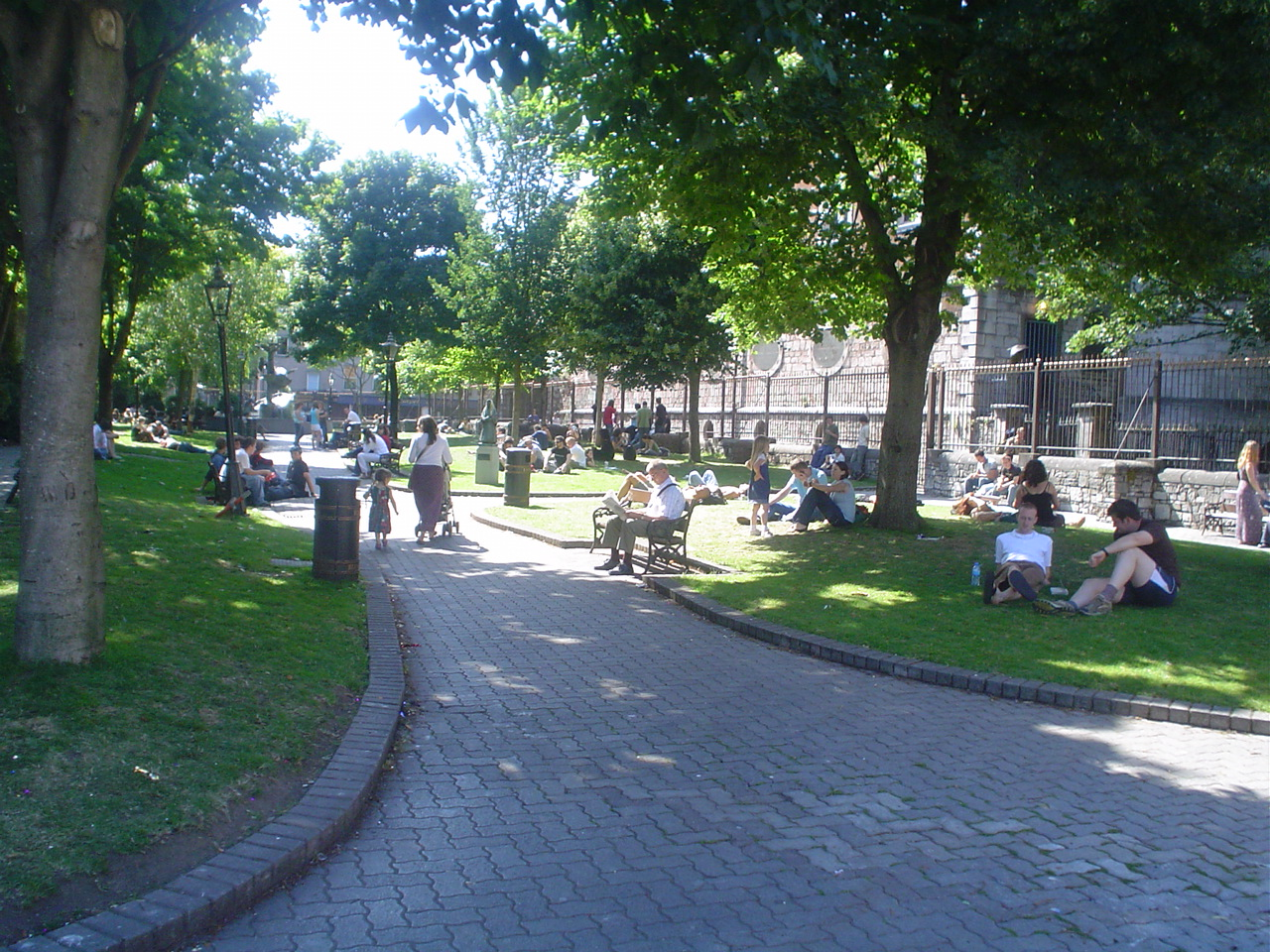
- Park visitors relaxing during fine weather
- Interactive map of Bishop Lucey Park
- Type: Public
- Location: Cork, Ireland
- Coordinates: 51°53′50″N 8°28′32″W
- Created: 1985
- Status: Open all year

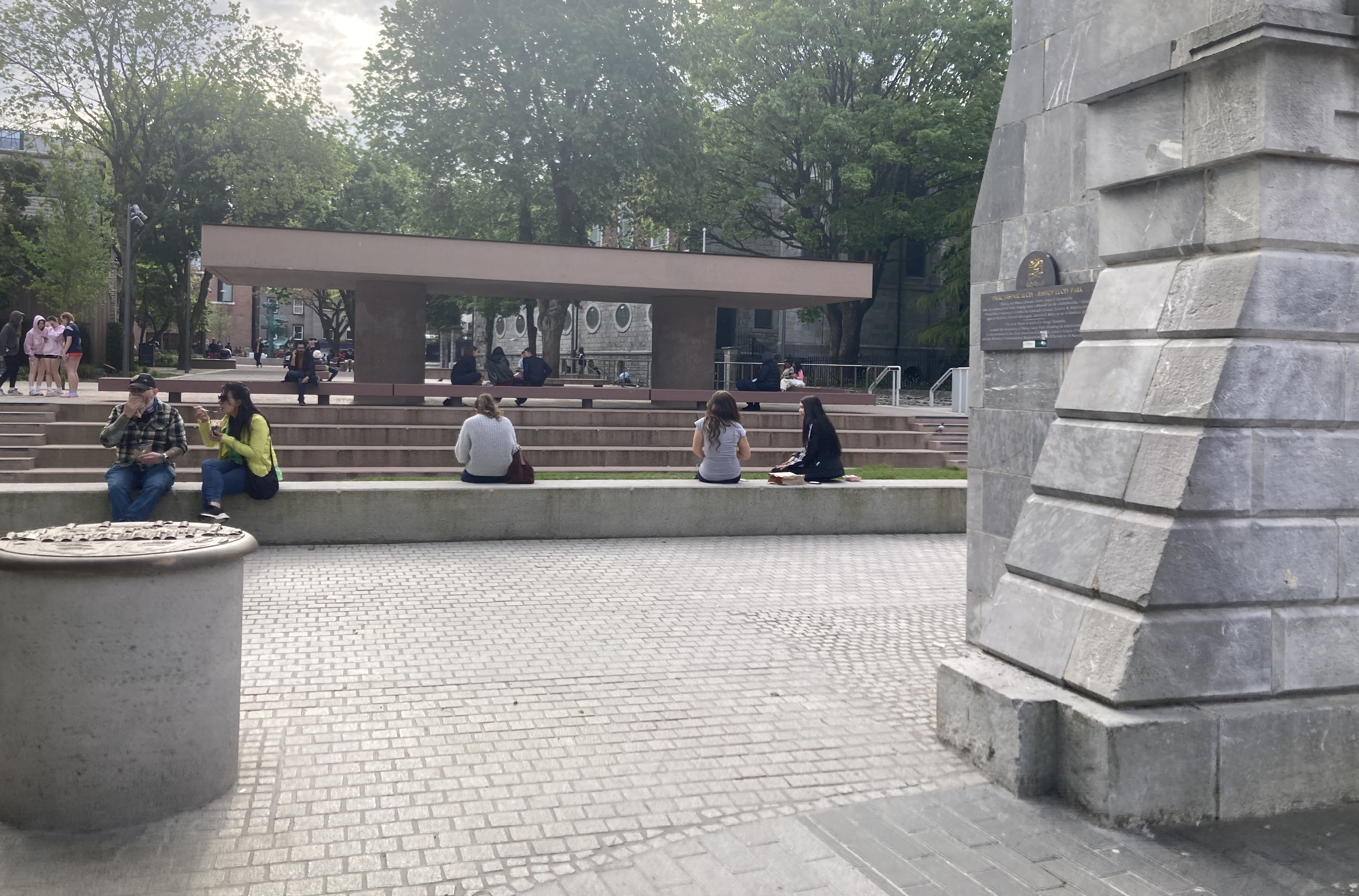
The redeveloped entrance from the Grand Parade

Bishop Lucey Park, sometimes known locally as the "People's Park", is a public park located between Grand Parade and South Main Street in the centre of Cork in Ireland. It is, according to Cork City Council, one of the "most [...] widely used" amenity spaces in the city centre.

== History ==
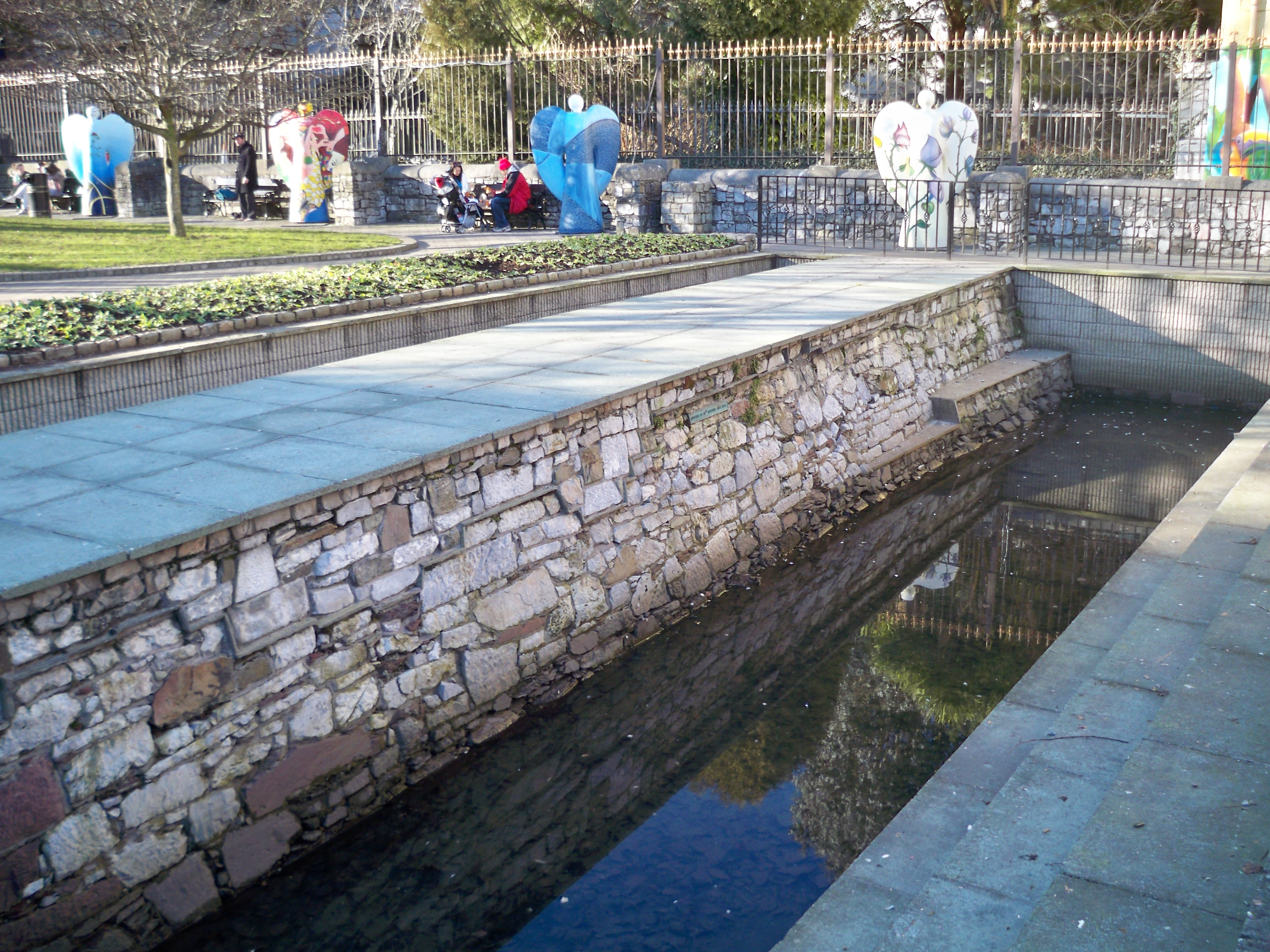
Remains of part of Cork's city walls in Bishop Lucey Park.

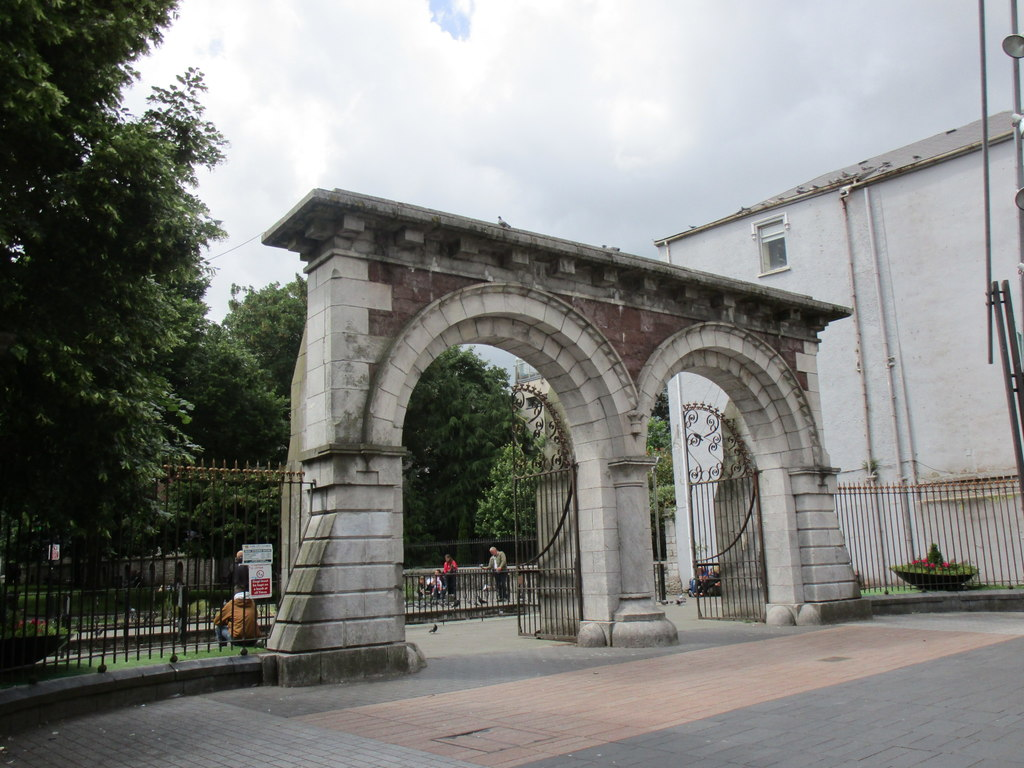
The park's main gates were originally sited at the corn market on Anglesea Street.

The site of Bishop Lucey Park lies within the site of the original Hiberno-Norse settlement of Cork. A portion of the old city wall was excavated during the park construction and is visible near the Grand Parade entrance.

For almost 800 years, the location of the park was a built environment, with a variety of commercial buildings, religious buildings and schools occupying portions of the site.

In 1970, Jennings department store burnt down, leaving a substantial amount of the site derelict. It was decided to create a new park on the site in time for the celebration of the 800th anniversary of Cork being granted a charter in 1985. The new park was named in honour of the first Bishop of Cork and Ross Cornelius Lucey, who had died in 1982.

The gates to the park, which was officially opened on 6 December 1985, were moved from the former site of Cork's corn market on Anglesea Street.

In 2020, Cork City North East councillor Oliver Moran suggested that it may be appropriate to rename Bishop Lucey Park and certain other place names in the city in light of the publication of the Commission of Investigation into Mother and Baby Homes final report.

In late 2023, the park was closed in advance of significant redevelopment. As of December 2023, the park was due to reopen – with a new layout – in "early 2025". It was officially reopened in November 2025.

== Usage ==
The park is used by city centre workers and residents and is one of the few green spaces in Cork City Centre. It can be particularly crowded at lunchtime when, if the weather permits, people take lunch al fresco.

At winter time, the park has previously hosted Christmas illuminations, run alongside a Christmas market held on Grand Parade. Christchurch Lane, which had been a pedestrian lane running alongside Christ Church on the northern edge of the park, was incorporated into the park in 2011.

There are a number of artworks within the park. A copy of Séamus Murphy's sculpture "The Onion Seller" was donated by hosiery manufacturers Sunbeam Wolsey when the park opened. (Note: Another copy, donated by a McDonald's franchisee on Winthrop Street in 1995, was moved to Cornmarket Street — "the Coal Quay".)
