= Dolly's Brae conflict =

1849 skirmish in Ulster

Coordinates: 54°16′07″N 6°00′15″W

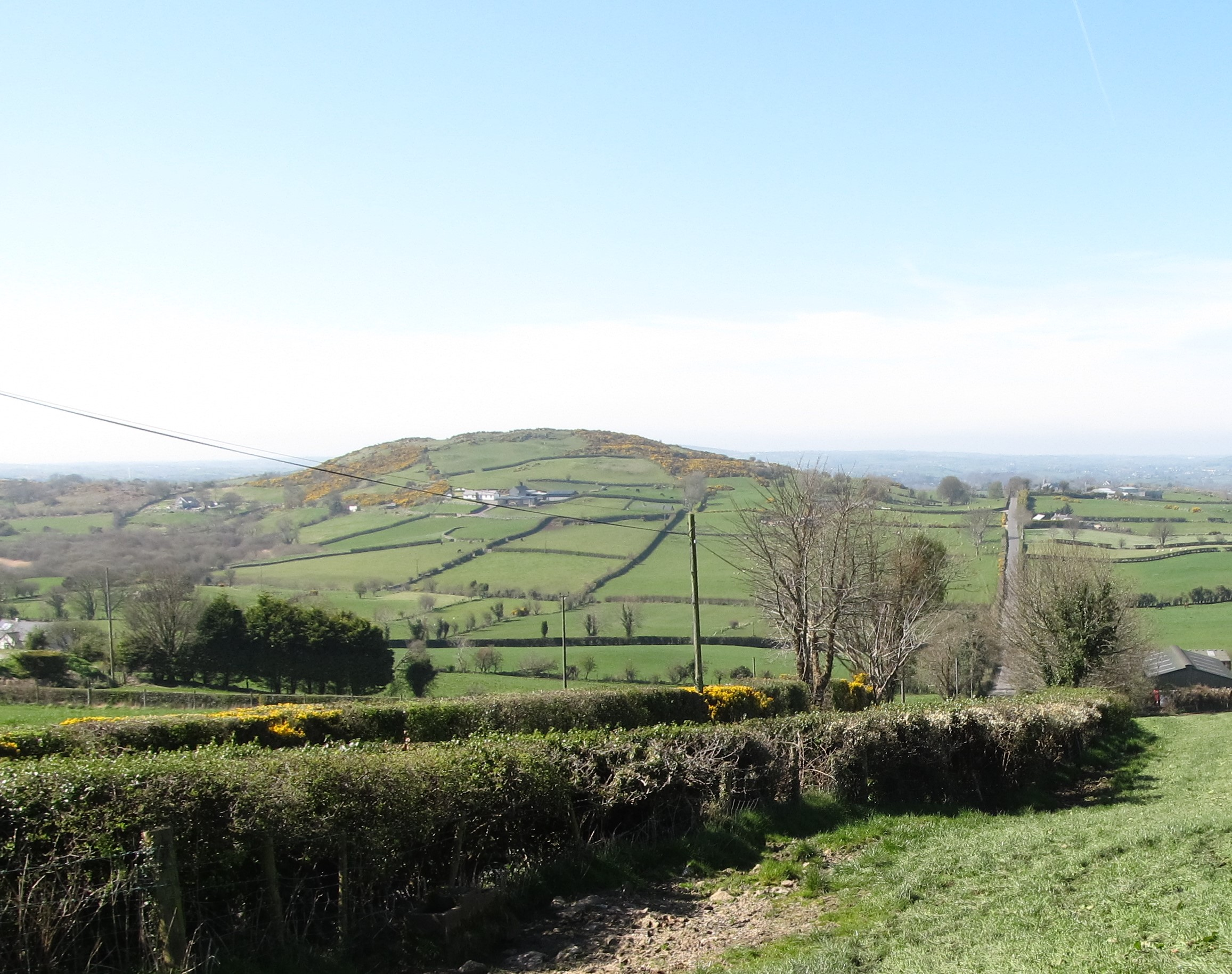
Overview of Dolly's Brae and Magheramayo Hill

The Dolly's Brae conflict occurred near Castlewellan in County Down, Ulster, on 12 July 1849. A large group of Orangemen had elected to march from Ballyward Church to Tollymore Park and back again. The outward journey proceeded without incident, but as the Orangemen were returning, they were confronted at Dolly's Brae by a group of Catholic Ribbonmen intent on blocking their progress. The Ribbonmen were ultimately dispersed with the help of the army and police.

At least five people died, one an Orangeman and the others Catholic civilians who were killed in retaliation for the attack. It has been claimed that as many as 30 Ribbonmen may have fallen, but this is unconfirmed. The violence led directly to the Party Processions Act of 1850, curtailing activities perceived to be sectarian in Ireland. Nevertheless, the conflict entered Ulster Protestant folk memory as the Battle of Dolly's Brae.

== Context ==
The 1840s were a significant decade in Irish history. The Great Famine began in 1845, resulting in around one million deaths. A nationalist rebellion by William Smith O'Brien's Young Ireland movement occurred in 1848.

Sectarian tensions rose during the decade. The Orange Order experienced a revival, having been suppressed in previous years, and was once again permitted to hold processions. Catholic groups also organized their own processions. In early 1849, a riot broke out in Crossgar, County Down, further heightening tensions ahead of the traditional Orange marching season in July.

Sectarian tensions had been building up in South Down throughout the 1840s. In 1848 local magistrates had persuaded South Down Orangemen to re-route their annual 12 July march away from areas with a majority Catholic population. This included Dolly's Brae, which was known as the site of a sectarian murder of a Catholic at the beginning of the century. The Orangemen's compliance brought taunts of cowardice from Catholic Ribbonmen, who had even composed a song about the affair. The Orangemen were determined to march their traditional route the next year, the matter having become a point of pride for them.

== 12 July 1849 ==
Prior to 12 July, the local authorities, alarmed by the prospect of a confrontation at Dolly's Brae, had called for additional troops and police to be sent to the district. Their alarm increased when a local magistrate received a letter (purportedly from a group of "repaillers") promising to use "good powder and ball" on both the Orangemen and the authorities if they showed their faces at Dolly's Brae on the 12th. On the morning of the 12th, a detachment of soldiers and police took up positions on the Brae. Shortly after their arrival, 300–400 "Threshers" or Ribbonmen appeared, armed with scythes, pikes, and pitchforks, as well as pistols and muskets. Their numbers would double over the course of the day. At 11 am, the Orange procession arrived, led by police and military escorts. It comprised approximately 1,500–2,000 Orangemen (400–500 of whom were armed), along with a number of their wives and children. The local Catholic priest, Father Morgan, persuaded the Ribbonmen to hold their fire, and the marchers were suffered to pass by, receiving only the taunts of some local women. They continued to Tollymore Park, where they were entertained by Lord Roden, the deputy grandmaster of the Orange Order.

In spite of the pleas of George Fitzmaurice, one of the magistrates who had been charged with keeping the peace, Lord Roden made no attempt to convince the Orangemen to return by a different route. Accordingly, the procession reappeared at Dolly's Brae after 5 pm. The Ribbonmen had by this time moved westwards, taking up new positions on either side of the road and on the slopes of Magheramayo Hill. As the tail of the procession was passing beneath the hill, an unknown party set off a squib. Two shots then rang out, followed by a volley from the Ribbonmen. The firing then became general.

The police escort bringing up the rear of the procession charged up the hill, taking many of the Ribbonmen prisoner and putting the rest to flight. A detachment of Orangemen also scaled the hill. Meanwhile, however, others in the Orange party took indiscriminate revenge on the Catholics in the neighbourhood. Several houses were burned, allegedly because their occupants had sniped at the procession. Four civilians were killed, including an elderly woman, the local "idiot", and a boy of about ten, who was shot while running across a field.

== Aftermath ==
The uproar over the conflict led directly to parliament passing the Party Processions Act 1850, which prohibited open marching, organised parades and sectarian meetings. Actions such as using banners, emblems and flags constituted an offence, as did music "calculated or tend to provoke animosity". Violation of the act was classed as a misdemeanour. The act was reluctantly accepted by the Orangemen. However, Irish nationalists later felt restricted in their activities by it, and it was repealed in 1872.

As well as the act of Parliament, Roden and two other Orange magistrates were dismissed from the magistracy, following a report by Walter Berwick QC, which criticized their handling of the incident.

Despite these setbacks, the "Battle of Dolly's Brae" entered Ulster Protestant folklore. As Sean Farrell says, "the Rathfriland Orangemen had won back their honour, but only at a very high price". A song, still recorded to this day, was composed to commemorate what was considered to be a great victory against the Ribbonmen. Ulster Protestant soldiers serving in the British Army at the Somme are said to have shouted "Remember Dolly's Brae" as they went into battle.
