= Thomas Barry (actor) =

Irish stage actor and theatre manager

- Born: 1743
- Died: April 1768 (aged 24–25); Dublin, Ireland
- Parent: Spranger Barry

Thomas Barry (1743 – April 1768) was an Irish stage actor and theatre manager.

He was the son of the actor Spranger Barry and his first wife Anne. In 1761, he made his debut at the Theatre Royal, Cork, which had been established by his father. He continued to act there for the next five years, also appearing in Dublin at the Crow Street Theatre. When his father departed for London in 1766, he left Thomas to manage the Cork Theatre, something that proved controversial with the local newspapers. Angered by an attack on his acting skills, Barry sued one of the publishers involved for libel but the case was dismissed. He was in turn briefly imprisoned for his conduct towards the publisher before the case was dropped.

Having made many enemies in his native Cork, the following year Thomas Barry left for London and in the summer of 1767 he joined his father and stepmother Ann Dancer at the Haymarket Theatre where he appeared in Venice Preserved, Jane Shore, Theodosius, King Lear and The Countess of Salisbury. Again questions were raised about his acting style, which was compared unfavourably with his fathers. He then travelled to Dublin, but grew increasingly ill and died in the city in April 1768. After his death, his wife appeared on the stage.

== Bibliography ==
- Clark, William Smith. The Irish Stage in the County Towns, 1720-1800. Clarendon Press, 1965.
- Highfill, Philip H, Burnim, Kalman A. & Langhans, Edward A. A Biographical Dictionary of Actors, Actresses, Musicians, Dancers, Managers, and Other Stage Personnel in London, 1660-1800: Volume I. SIU Press, 1978.
