= Maria Nossiter =

British actress (1735–1759)

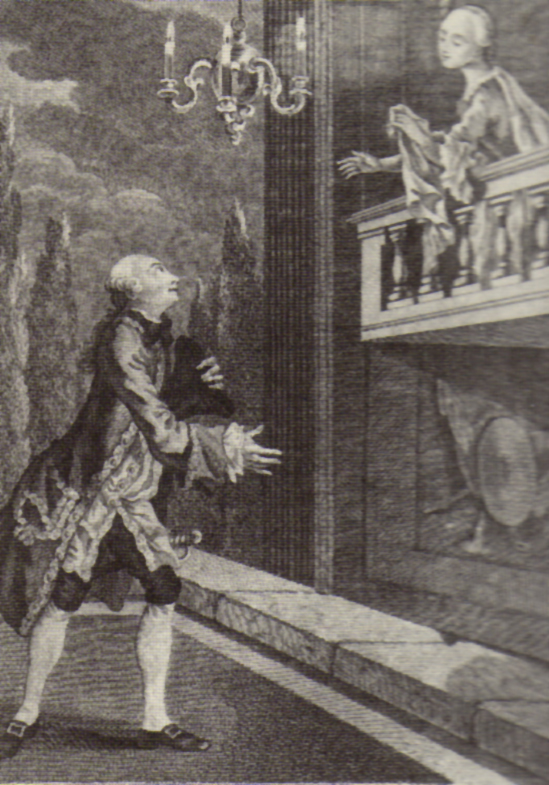
- Maria Nossiter (right) as Juliet to Spranger Barry's Romeo in Shakespeare's Romeo and Juliet in Covent Garden in 1759.
- Born: 1735
- Died: 25 April 1759 (aged 23–24)
- Known for: leading actress
- Partner: Spranger Barry
- Parent(s): George Cholmondeley, 3rd Earl of Cholmondeley and his housekeeper

Maria Isabella Nossiter (1735 – 25 April 1759) was a British stage actress. She died young having risen to a high salary and owning a share of a Dublin theatre.

== Life ==
Nossiter was born in 1735 and she is believed to be the daughter of George Cholmondeley, 3rd Earl of Cholmondeley and his "favourite" housekeeper. She was brought up well enjoying both an education and money. She was tutored by the leading actor, impresario and widower, Spranger Barry. At the age of eighteen she appeared in the leading role of Juliet opposite Barry (who appeared as Romeo) at Covent Garden in October 1753. The appearance was said to have an extra twist as it was understood that Nossiter and Barry were lovers. Nossitor was taking the role that Susannah Maria Cibber would have taken but she was appearing at Drury Lane. On the night Susanna Cibber came to watch the performance in what had been "her role", but despite this Nossiter gave a good performance and she came to be an audience favourite. The following month she appeared, again with Barry, as Belvedira in Venice Preserv'd.

Macnamara Morgan wrote the tragedy Philoclea which premiered at Covent Garden on 22 January 1754. The play was based on Philip Sidney’s Arcadia and it was presented for nine nights. Nossiter took the lead role in Philoclea and it was said that the play had been "brought forward and wrote purposely to show her to advantage by McNamara Morgan".

She and Barry lived in Bow Street, but disagreements over money made them take work at the Smock Alley Theatre in Dublin where Nossiter was paid £500 for a season's work. In the following season of 1755-1756 they left Dublin to return to the Covent Garden theatre where they played several parts opposite each other including King Lear, The Double Dealer, and Othello.

Nossiter wrote her will in the parish of St George's, Hanover Square. The actress George Anne Bellamy said she died of a broken heart as Barry had left her for another actress named Ann Dancer but tuberculosis is the likely cause. Her will was written on 11 August 1759 and she died a week later. She left money to her brother and her eighth share of the Crow Street Theatre to Barry.
