= Theodosius (play) =

1680 play

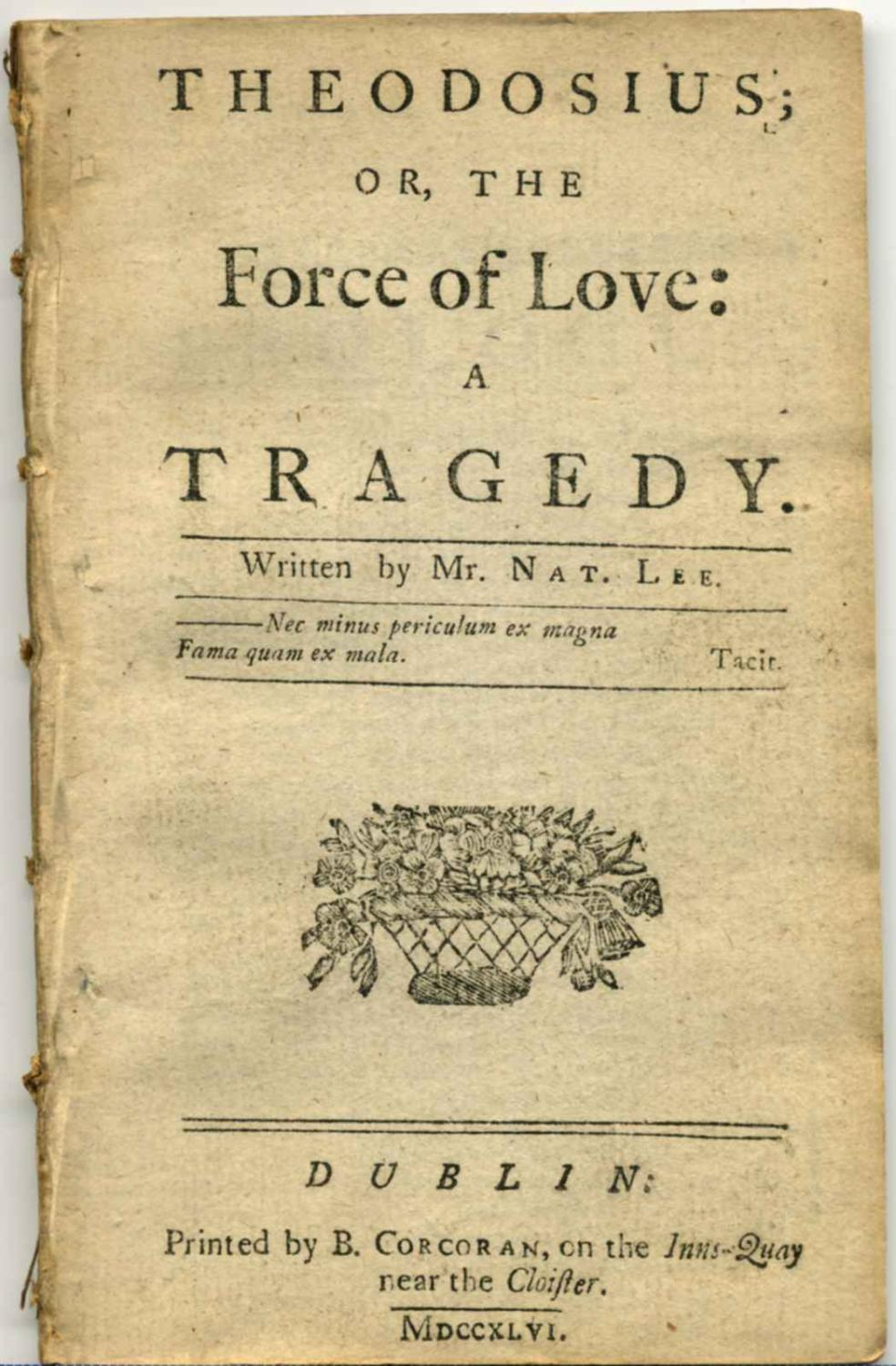
- 1746 Dublin edition
- Original language: English
- Written by: Nathaniel Lee
- Genre: Tragedy
- Setting: Constantinople, Roman Empire

Premiere
- Date: September 1680
- Place: Dorset Garden Theatre, London

Theodosius; Or, The Force Of Love is a 1680 tragedy by the English writer Nathaniel Lee. It was first staged by the Duke's Company at the Dorset Garden Theatre. It takes place during the reign of the Roman Emperor Theodosius II. Incidental music for the play was composed by Henry Purcell.

The original cast included Joseph Williams as Theodosius, Thomas Betterton as Varanes, William Smith as Marcian, John Wiltshire as Lucius, John Bowman as Atticus, Mary Betterton as Pulcheria and Elizabeth Barry as Athenais. The published version was dedicated to the Duchess of Richmond.

The play remained popular and was revived numerous times over the following century and a half. A 1744 version at the Smock Alley Theatre in Dublin used fresh compositions from Thomas Arne, the leading English-born composer of the era. Actors who appeared in the title role included Lacy Ryan, Henry Giffard, Thomas Barry and John Philip Kemble.

== Bibliography ==
- Cudworth, Charles. Music in Eighteenth-Century England: Essays in Memory of Charles Cudworth. Cambridge University Press, 1983.
- Van Lennep, W. The London Stage, 1660–1800: Volume One, 1660–1700. Southern Illinois University Press, 1960.
