= Dolly's Brae (song) =

Ulster unionist folk song

"Dolly's Brae", also known as "The Battle of Dolly's Brae", is a traditional Ulster loyalist folk ballad. It is a marching tune that bands play during Orange marches, including the Twelfth of July. It refers to the events of the Dolly's Brae conflict of 1849. The lyricist is unknown, it was written in late 1849, following the conflict.

== History and publishing ==
The song was composed in the immediate aftermath of the skirmish on 12 July 1849. According to musicologist John Moulden, the popular version of "Dolly's Brae" was printed and widely distributed as a broadside ballad by the Nicholson printing house in Belfast later that same year.

In academic analyses of Ulster sectarian song cultures, "Dolly's Brae" is noted for being part of an ongoing musical dialogue between competing factions in County Down during the 1840s. In 1848, local magistrates had successfully persuaded local Orangemen to re-route their annual Twelfth march away from the disputed mountain pass to avoid violence. This compliance led Catholic Ribbonmen to compose a taunting ballad mockingly accusing the Orangemen of cowardice.

== Recordings ==
It has been recorded on CD by Richard Hayward and The Loyal Brethren.

The Sands Family, a musical family band also recorded their own version of the song.

DJ Mickey Modelle also released a version of it on his The Greatest Ever Orange Dance Anthems album in 2018.

The song was used during the BBC Irish field recordings, 1950 as they shown the song being sung in rural Ulster homes.

Other popular recordings include versions by loyalist Sam Carson, Lilly Wilson, Sylvia Pavis and Bobby Parks.

== Background ==
The song commemorates the events of July 12 1849, when a procession of the Orange Order was ambushed by Ribbonmen at a mountain pass near Castlewellan, County Down. The Orangemen were returning from a celebration at Tollymore Park, the estate of Lord Roden, the deputy Grand Master of the Orange Order in Ireland.

The pass, known as Dolly's Brae, was a site of high sectarian tension. Despite the warnings from local magistrates and the presence of police constables and the army, the Orange procession insisted on taking the "old road" over the hill rather than a safer detour. The resulting skirmish led to the deaths of several Ribbonmen and the subsequent burning of local Catholic homes by the retreating procession.

== See also ==
- Dolly's brae conflict
- History of the Orange Order
- Unionism in Ireland
