= Parnell Place =

Street in Cork, Ireland

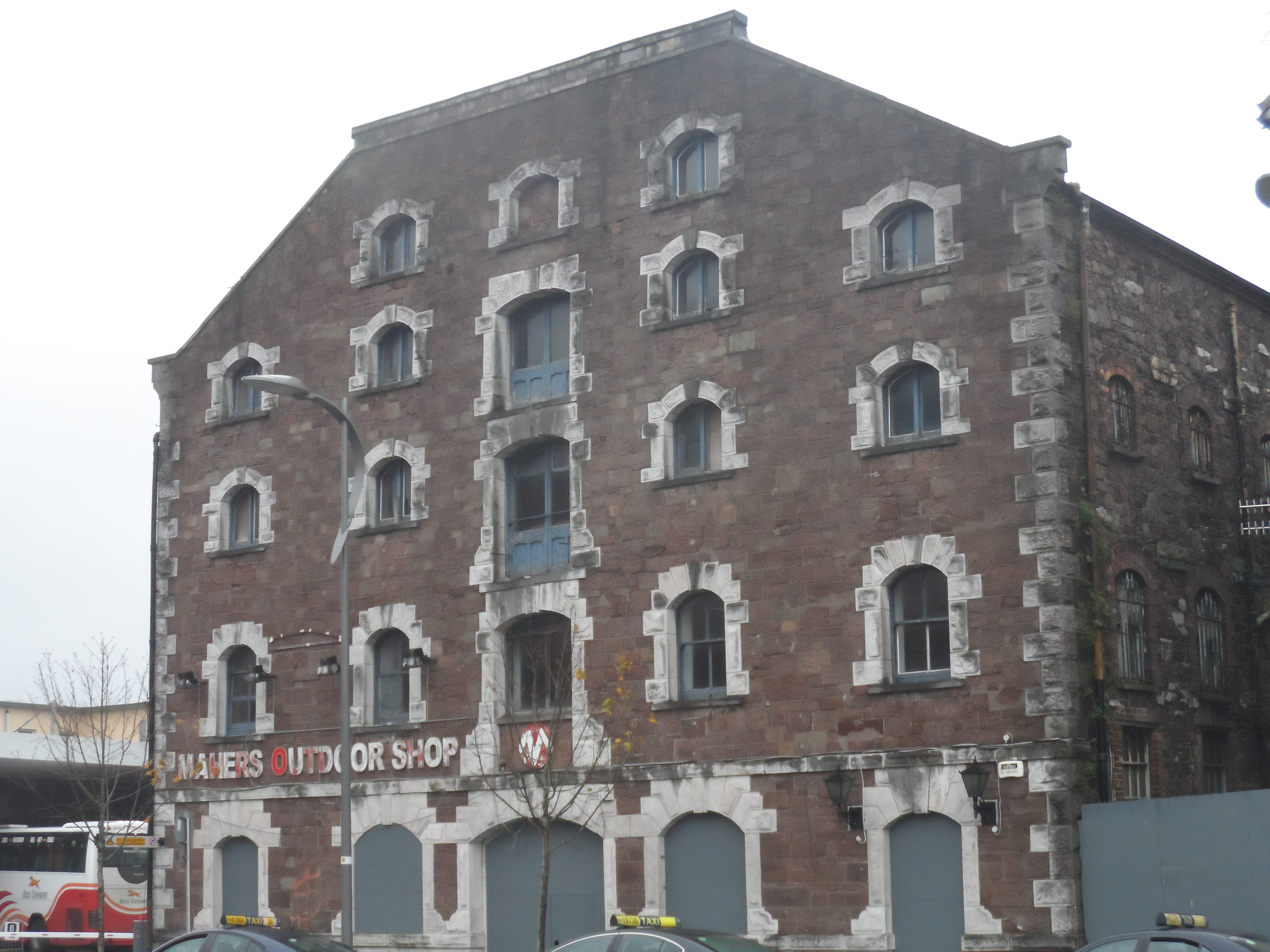
- Warehouse on Parnell Place

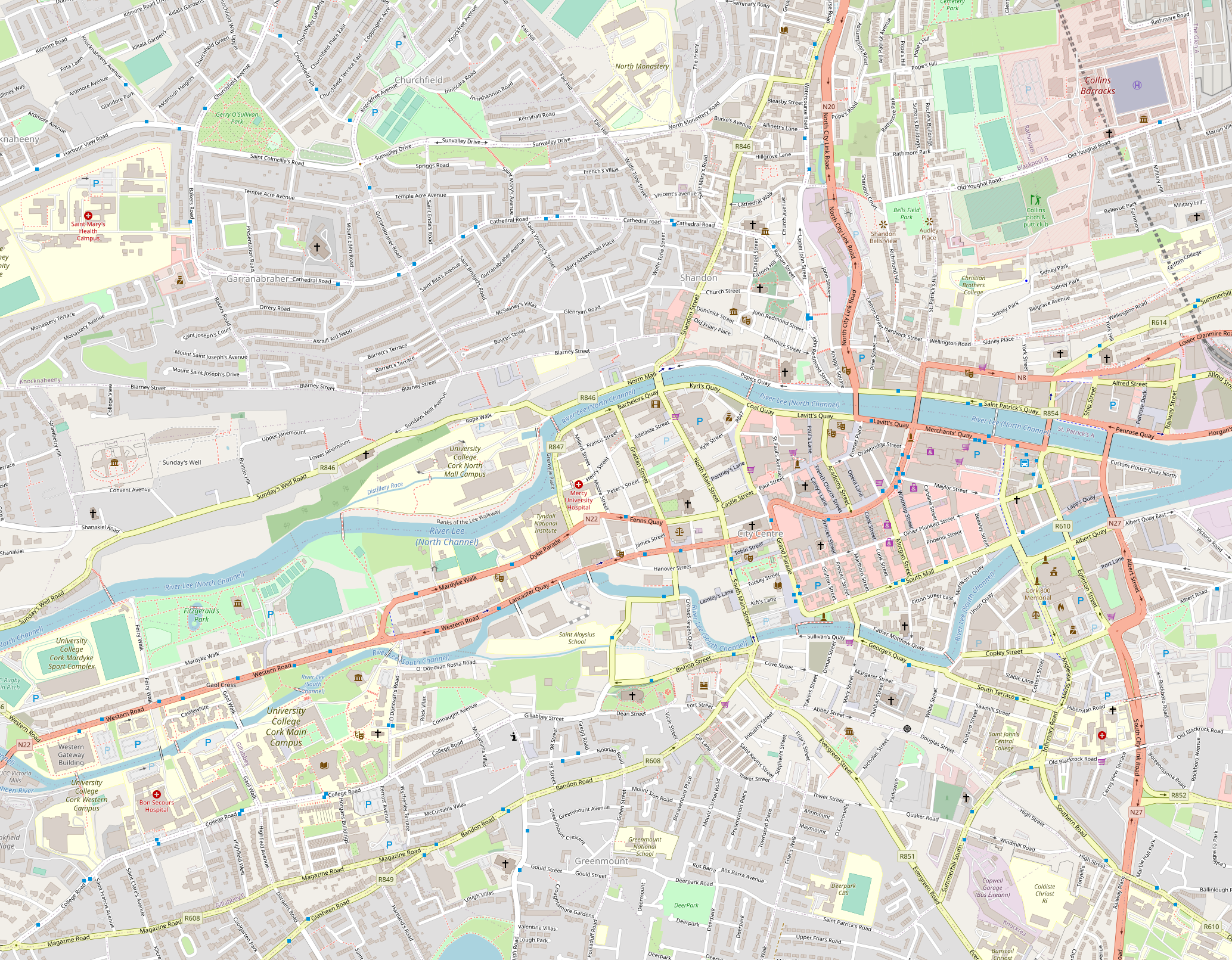
- Location within Cork Central
- Native name: Plás Parnell (Irish)
- Former names: Cold Harbour, Nelson's Quay, Warren's Place
- Namesake: Charles Stewart Parnell
- Length: 350 m (1,150 ft)
- Width: up to 29 metres (95 ft)
- Location: Cork, Ireland
- Postal code: T12
- Coordinates: 51.898634°N 8.467336°W
- north end: Merchant's Quay
- south end: Albert Quay, Anglesea Street

Parnell Place (Irish: Plás Parnell) is a street in Cork, Ireland. It is a major south-to-north route across the city centre, and the location of Parnell Place Bus Station.

In the south, it starts at the junction with South Mall, Lapp's Quay and Parnell Bridge, running to Merchant's Quay in the north. It is intersected by Oliver Plunkett Street and has junctions with the more minor Maylor Street and Merchant's Street.

Like the bus station and bridge, the street is named for Charles Stewart Parnell. Previously, Parnell Place has been variously known as Cold Harbour, Nelson's Quay and Warren's Place.
