= South Mall, Cork =

Street of Cork city, Ireland

South Mall
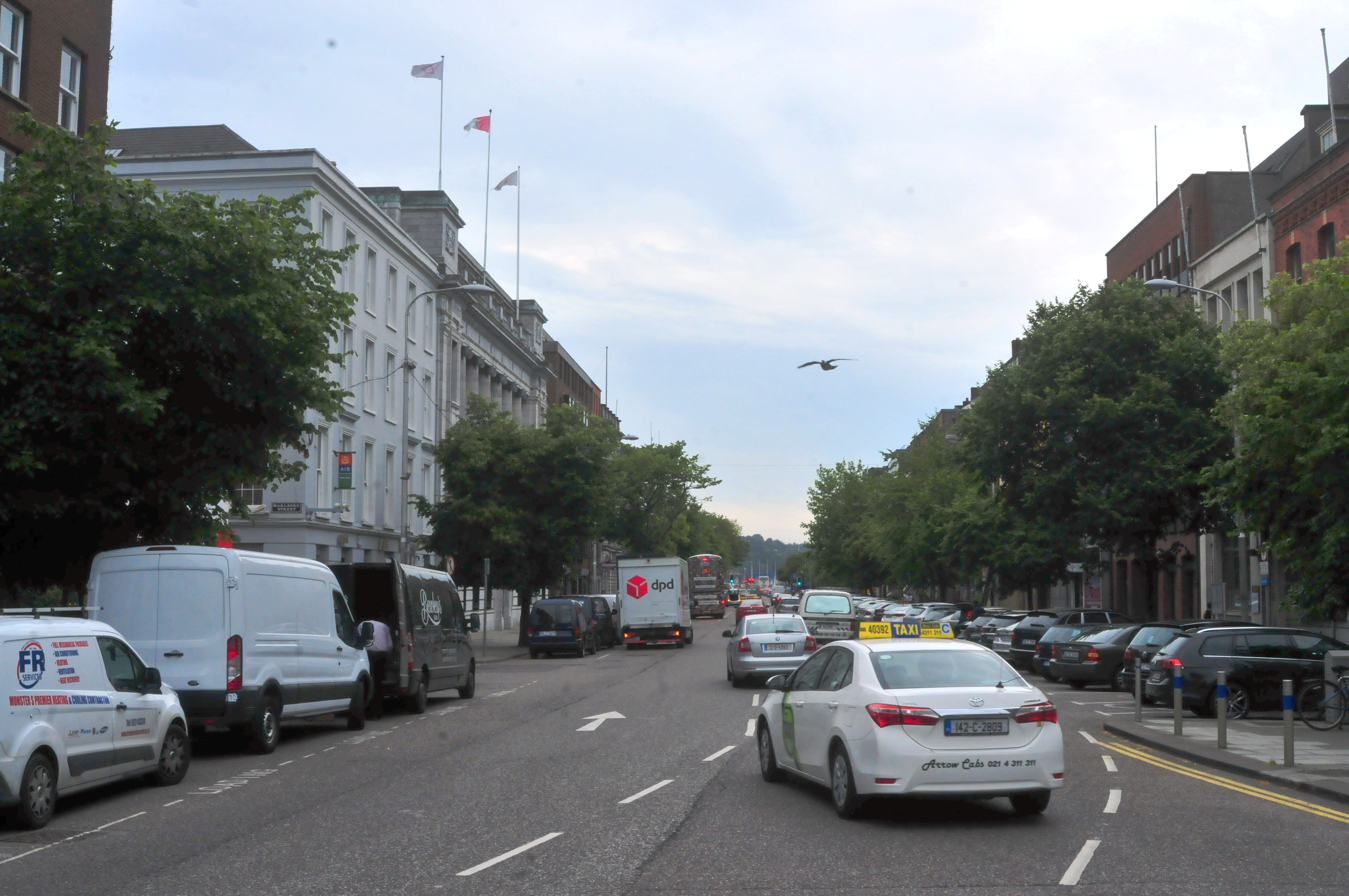
- South Mall looking East

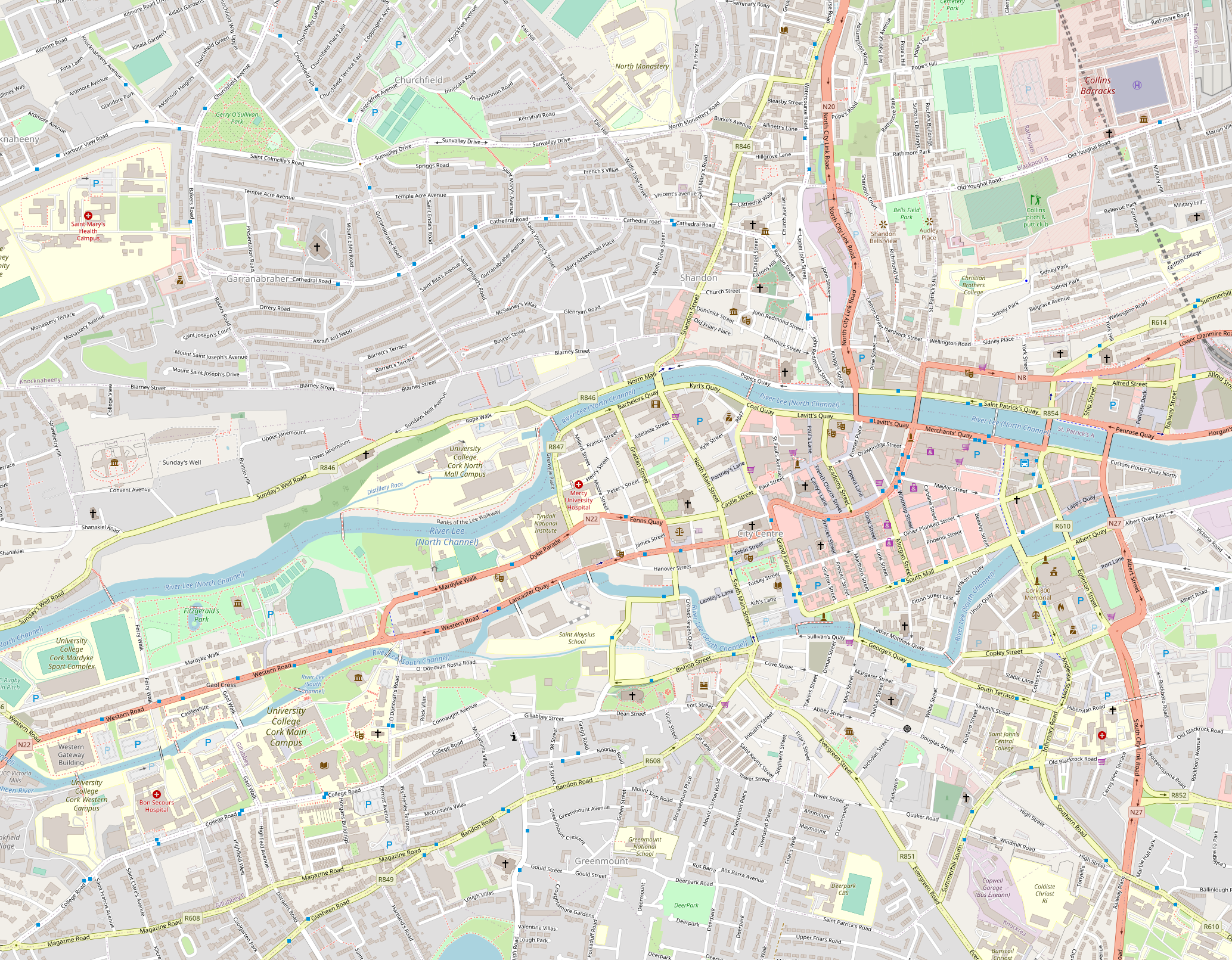
- Location within Cork Central
- Native name: An Meall Theas (Irish)
- Namesake: Mall, referring to a promenade
- Length: 650 m (2,130 ft)
- Width: 24 metres (79 ft)
- Location: Cork, Ireland
- Postal code: T12
- Coordinates: 51.8971°N 8.4697°W
- west end: Grand Parade
- Major junctions: Parnell Place
- east end: Anglesea Street

Other
- Known for: banking and financial services

South Mall (Irish: An Meall Theas) is one of the main streets of Cork city, Ireland. It runs from Grand Parade in the west to Parnell Place in the east. Like Grand Parade and St. Patrick's Street, it is built over what was once a channel of the River Lee.

== History ==
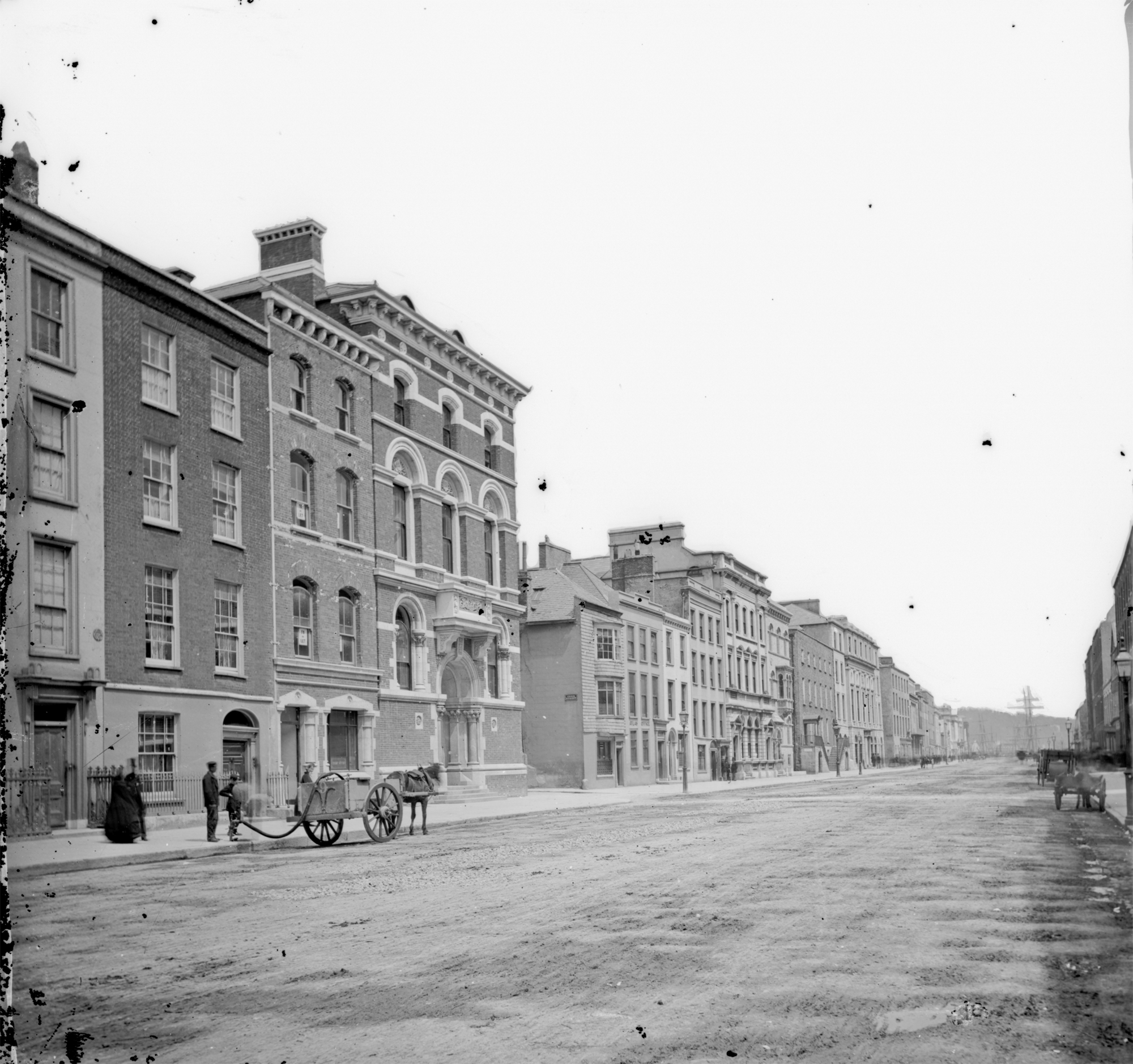
South Mall c.1871-1883

Traditionally, the street is one of the main centres of banking and financial services in the area, and also home to a number of legal offices and solicitors.

Among the notable buildings on the street is the branch of AIB. This started on its current site as Provincial Bank in 1825, while the current building was constructed between 1863 and 1865. As the street was once a channel of the river, some original 18th century buildings retain evidence of street-level boat houses, while others are built with bricks that were once used as ballast in visiting vessels.

== Today ==
Together with commercial developments elsewhere in the city, as of the early 21st century, there have been a number of developments on the South Mall. These include the opening of a shared office-space provider, 'Republic of Work', and the Maldron Hotel, the first new hotel in the city since 2004.
