= Party Processions Act 1850 =

Act of the Parliament of the United Kingdom

Party Processions (Ireland) Act 1850
- Act of Parliament
- Parliament of the United Kingdom
- Long title: An Act to restrain Party Processions in Ireland.
- Citation: 13 & 14 Vict. c. 2
- Territorial extent: United Kingdom

Dates
- Royal assent: 12 March 1850
- Commencement: 12 March 1850 (Note: Section 1.)
- Repealed: 27 June 1872
Other legislation
Repealed by	Party Processions Act (Ireland) Repeal Act 1872

Status: Repealed

Text of statute as originally enacted

Party Processions Act (Ireland) Repeal Act 1872
- Act of Parliament
- Parliament of the United Kingdom
- Long title: An Act to repeal an Act, intituled "An Act to restrain Party Processions in Ireland."
- Citation: 35 & 36 Vict. c. 22
- Territorial extent: United Kingdom

Dates
- Royal assent: 27 June 1872
- Commencement: 27 June 1872
- Repealed: 25 August 1883
Other legislation
Repeals/revokes	Party Processions Act 1850
Repealed by	Statute Law Revision Act 1883

Status: Repealed

Text of statute as originally enacted

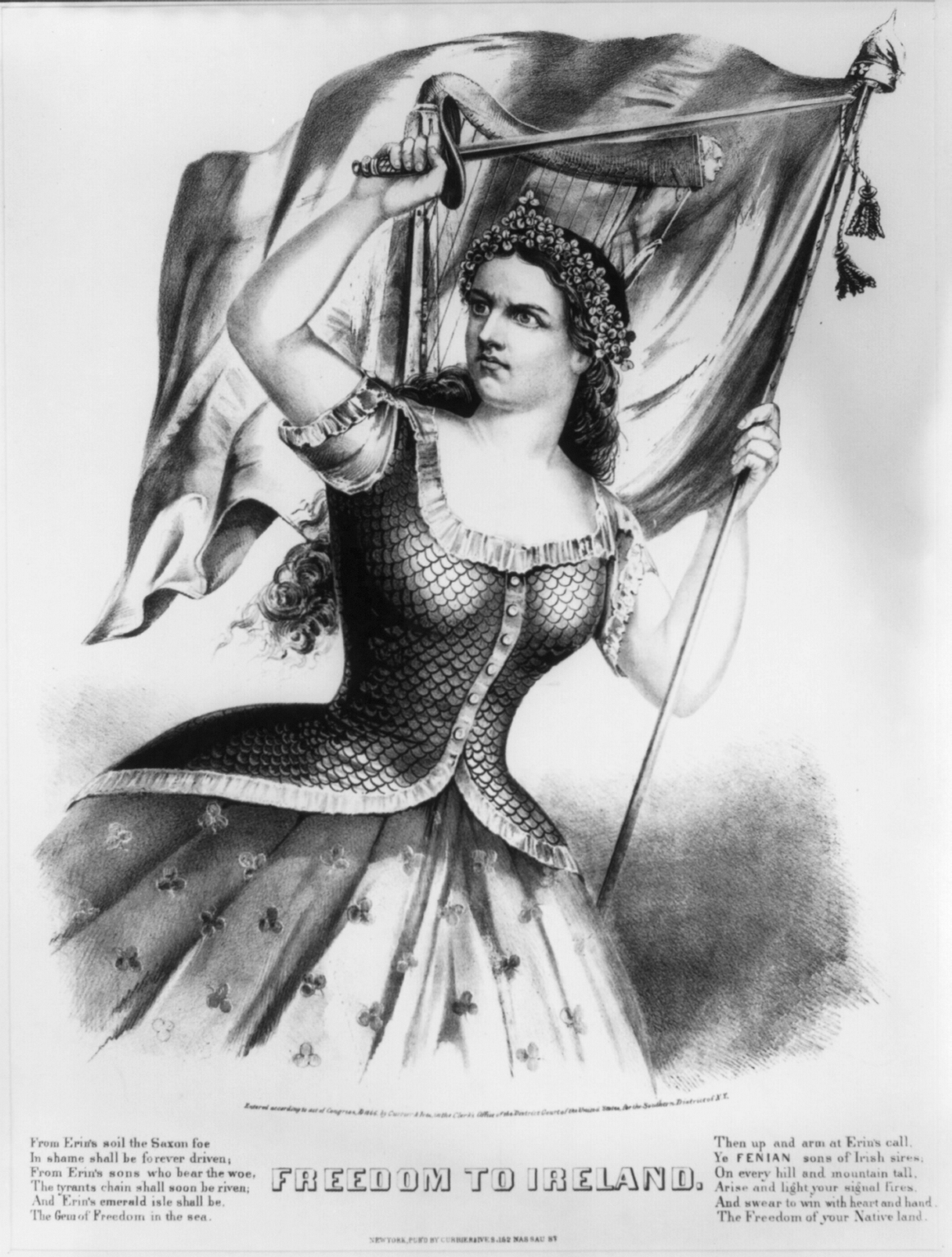
"Freedom to Ireland", a patriotic lithograph by Currier & Ives, New York, ca 1866. The Party Processions Act prohibited music, flags, banners, fire arms and party colours from being paraded in Ireland between its issue in 1850 and its repeal in 1872.

The Party Processions Act 1850 (13 & 14 Vict. c. 2), also known as the Party Processions (Ireland) Act 1850 was an act of the Parliament of the United Kingdom which prohibited open marching, organised parades and sectarian meetings in Ireland in order to outlaw provocative movements in the wake of the Dolly's Brae fighting of 1849. Written on 8 February, the act was assembled against people "in the practice of assembling and marching together in procession in Ireland in a manner calculated to create and perpetuate animosities between different classes of Her Majesty's Subjects, and to endanger the public peace." Actions such as using banners, emblems and flags constituted an offence, as did music "calculated or tend to provoke animosity". Violation of the act was classed as a misdemeanor. The act was strongly supported by Sir Robert Peel however opposed by other politicians such as Lord Claude Hamilton who argued that religious parades would also be outlawed, yet posed no threat.

The Party Emblems (Ireland) Act 1860 (23 & 24 Vict. c. 141) was passed to further support this measure following further riots at Derrymacash. The act was "grudgingly" accepted by the Orangemen, however both the Irish Republican Brotherhood, the Young Ireland movement, and related Fenian movements were less placated. William Johnston of Ballykilbeg led a radical Orangemen group in defiance of the act during the 1860s, and was imprisoned – prompting strong demand for its repeal in 1867, which succeeded in 1872. The issue and repeal of the act is viewed as an important milestone by nationalist historians of Ireland, and is said to be an example of Irish suppression by the "English" government. Peel, however, was one of a number of Members of Parliament who viewed the act as a necessity to prevent Catholic and Protestant in-fighting rather than Irish nationalism as a whole. Traditional, revisionist and post-revisionist historians have subsequently supported either viewpoint and the act remains a controversial one.

== Background ==
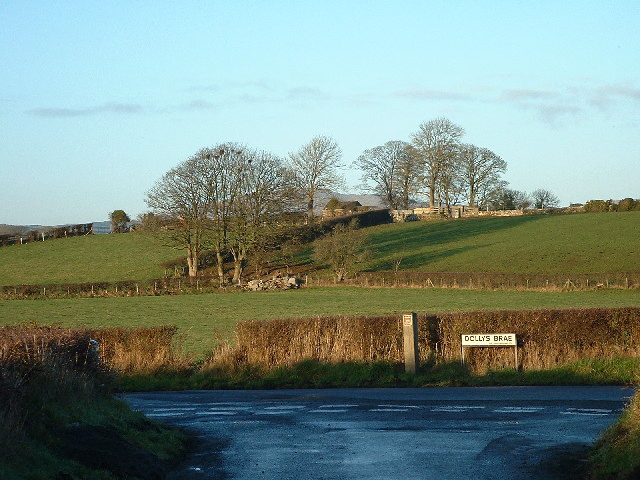
Dolly's Brae

On 12 July 1849, Orangemen marched from Rathfriland to Tollymore Park in County Down, Ireland to celebrate the anniversary of the Battle of Boyne, where William of Orange defeated the Catholic King James II of England. While passing through Magheramayo, which was predominantly Catholic, the group exchanged shots with a number of Ribbonmen. Ribbonism was a strongly Catholic Irish independence movement loosely associated with areas of Ulster and northern Connacht. The Orangemen proceeded to attack Catholic houses within the town, and roughly 30 Catholic people were killed. The event was subsequently known as Dolly's Brae. In the previous years, unrest in Ireland had been rising during the Great Famine which had reduced Ireland's population by over a quarter – it was perceived by anti-Union movements including Young Ireland and the fenians to have been poorly handled by the English government. Liberal policies of the United Kingdom government, manifesting in the Catholic emancipation of 1829 and other reforms spurned by the efforts of Daniel O'Connell were marginalising and polarising the Irish Protestant population. The Protestant Orangemen in particular utilised elaborate parades, with banners, music and flags, to facilitate an anti-Catholic agenda. The British government viewed these events with trepidation – while much of the English media exhibited a blend of confusion and amusement. As a result, a bill to "restrain party processions in Ireland" was put forward on 8 February 1850, in the House of Commons and amended by the House of Lords.

== Provisions ==
The act itself, entitled "An Act to Restrain Party Processions in Ireland" stated:

"Whereas Numbers of Persons have been in the Practice of assembling and marching together in procession in Ireland in a Manner calculated to create and perpetuate Animosities between different Classes of Her Majesty's Subjects, and to endanger the public Peace: Be it therefore enacted by the Queen's most Excellent Majesty by and with the Advice and Consent of the Lords, Spiritual and Temporal, and the Commons, in this present Parliament assembled, and by the Authority of the same, That from and after the passing of this Act all Assemblies of Persons in Ireland who shall meet and parade together or join in procession, and who shall bear, wear or have amongst them or any of them any fire-arms or other offensive Weapons, or any Banner, Emblem, Flag or Symbol, the Display whereof may be calculated or tend to provoke Animosity between different Classes of Her Majesty's Subjects, or who shall be accompanied by any Person or Persons playing Music which may be calculated or tent to provoke Animosity between different Classes of Her Majesty's Subjects, shall be unlawful Assemblies, and every person present thereat shall be guilty of a Misdemeanor, and upon Conviction thereof shall be punished accordingly."

William Johnston of Ballykilbeg was imprisoned in the 1860s for violating the Party Processions Act 1860, and on 12 July 1867 a number of Orangemen partaking in celebration of the Battle of Boyne received summons for prosecution under the act, which earned them local media notoriety. An 1864 mass-rally for the memory of O'Connell, who had died in 1849, included several banners, flags, colours and songs prohibited by the act, which prompted discussion in the House of Lords and the House of Commons regarding the appropriate inclusion of such events in February 1865. Lord Hamilton claimed to have collated reports of 60,000 to 80,000 strong parades violating the particulars of the act however without once resorting to language or behaviour constituting any breach of the peace. Peel retorted that the law was created to prevent conflict between Catholic and Protestant groups, and that it did not marginalise peaceful marches. Johnston's imprisonment generated, by 1867, strong calls for the act to be repealed along with its accompanying Party Emblems Act 1860. It was repealed in 1872.

== See also ==
- Northern Ireland flags issue similar controversy in the 20th and 21st century

== Bibliography ==
Primary

- 1850 (34) Party Processions. (Ireland) A bill to restrain party processions in Ireland. House of Commons Parliamentary Papers.
- "Great Debates on Party Processions," The Nation 25 February 1865.
- "Orange Demonstrations and Soiree in Portadown," The Belfast News-Letter, 16 November 1867.

Online

- "Bill to restrain Party Processions in Ireland (Lords' Amendments)". House of Commons Parliamentary Papers. Parliamentary Papers Online. 1850.

Secondary printed

- Adelman, Paul; R. Pearce (2008). Great Britain and the Irish Question (Second ed.). Hodder Education. ISBN 978-0-340-88901-5.
- Bew, Paul (2007). Ireland, The Politics of Enmity 1789-2006. Oxford University Press. ISBN 978-0-19-956126-1.
- Carnevali, F. and J-M. Strange, ed. (2007). 20th Century Britain (Second ed.). Pearson Longman.
- Clarke, Peter (1997). Hope and Glory, Britain 1900-2000 (Second ed.). Penguin books. ISBN 0-14-101175-0.
- Connolly, S. J. (2002). Oxford Companion to Irish History (Second ed.). Oxford University Press. ISBN 978-0-19-923483-7.
- English, Richard (2006). Irish Freedom, The History of Nationalism in Ireland. Pan Books. ISBN 978-0-330-42759-3.
- Kee, Robert (1972). The Green Flag, A History of Irish Nationalism. Penguin books. ISBN 978-0-14-029165-0.
- Farrell, Sean (1997). ""Recapturing the Flag: The Campaign to Repeal the Party Processions Act, 1860-72"". Eire-Ireland. 32 (2–3): 52–78. doi:10.1353/eir.1997.0016. S2CID 159923405.
