= Spranger Barry =

Irish actor (1719–1777)

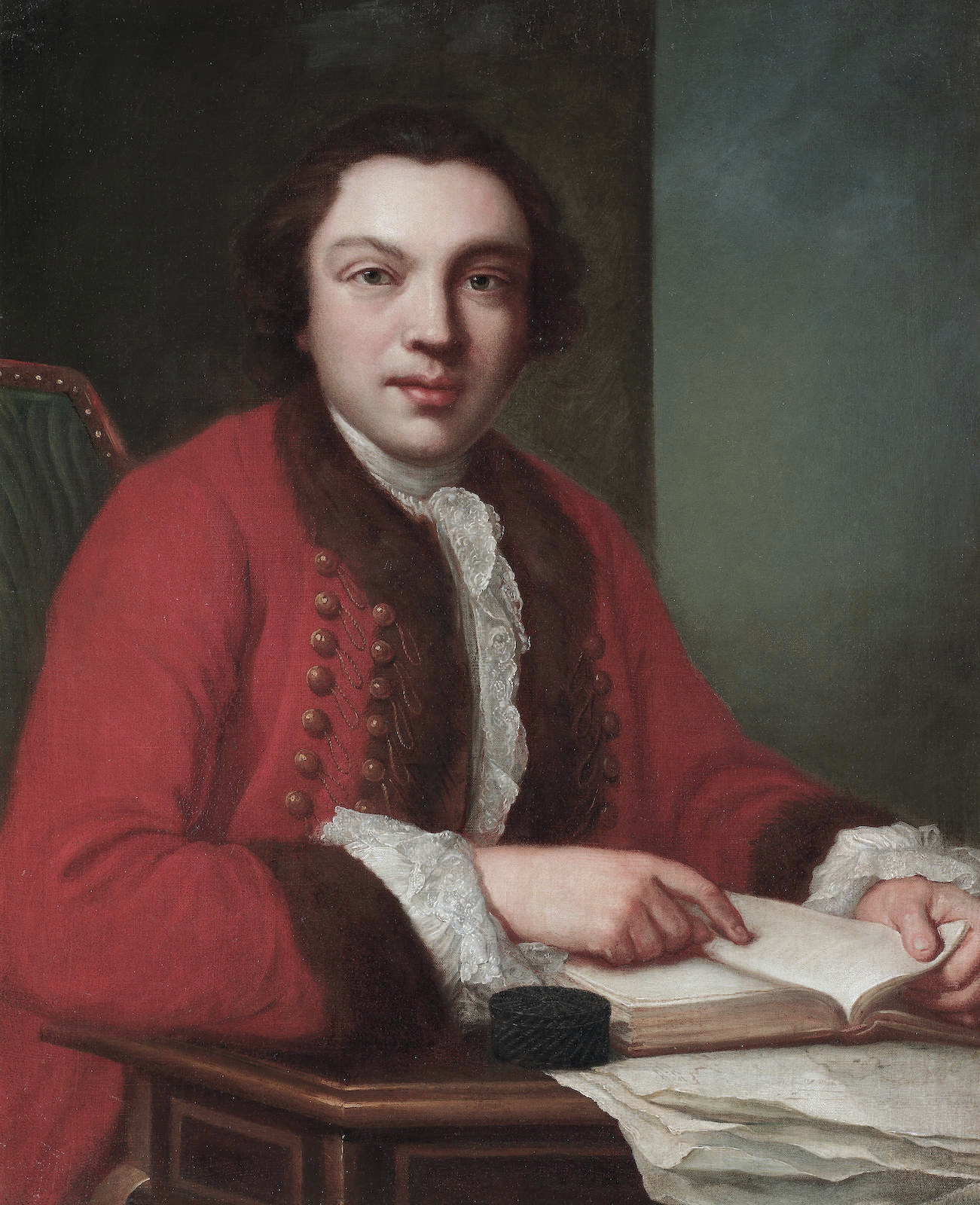
- Born: 23 November 1719; Dublin, Ireland
- Died: 10 January 1777 (aged 57)
- Notable work: Crow Street Theatre
- Spouse: Ann Street (m. 1768)
- Children: Thomas

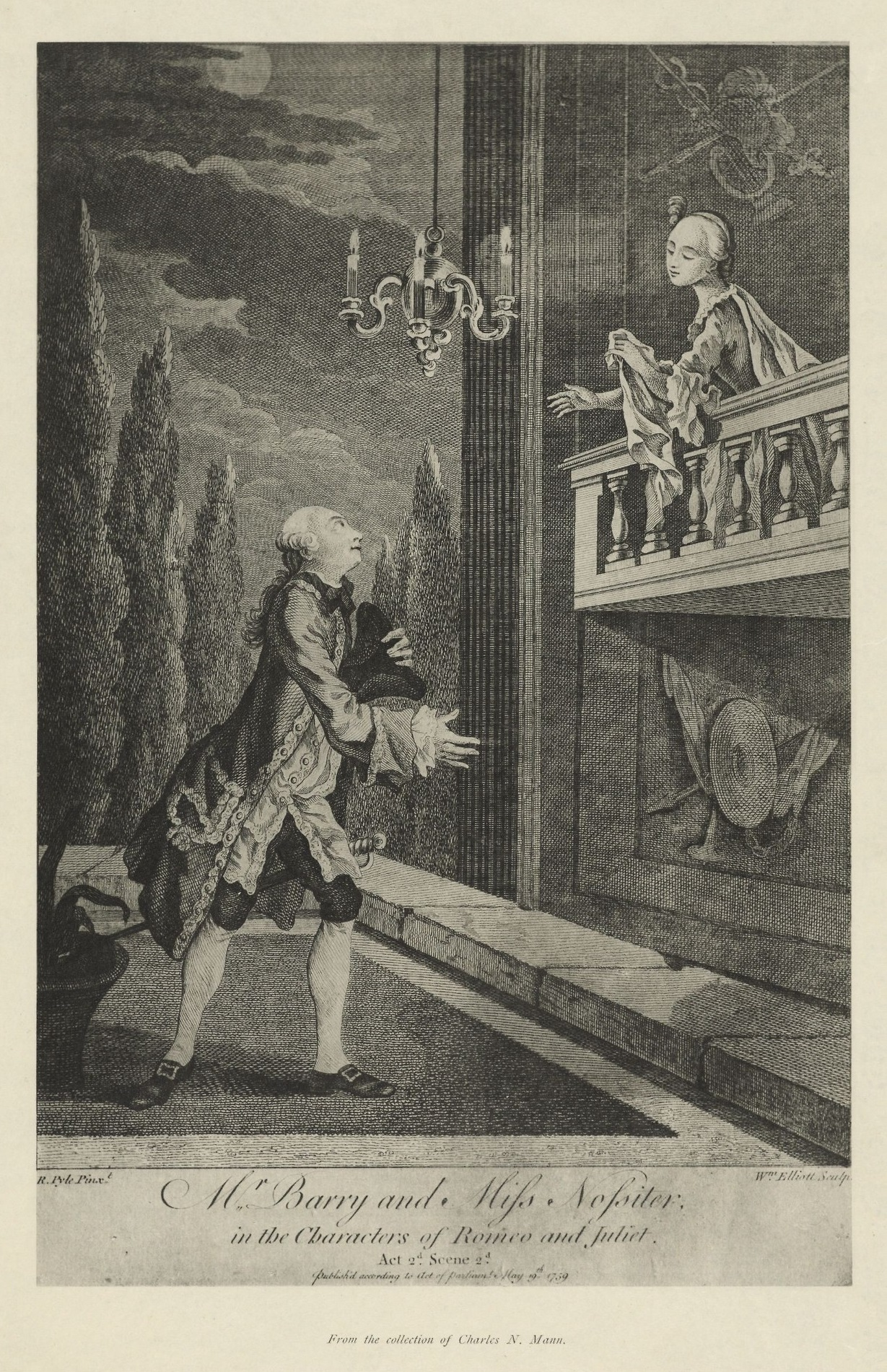
Spranger Barry (left) as Romeo to Maria Nossiter's Juliet in Shakespeare's Romeo and Juliet in Covent Garden in 1759.

Spranger Barry (23 November 1719 – 10 January 1777) was an Irish actor.

== Life ==
He was born in Skinner's Row, Dublin, the son of silversmith William Barry, to whose business he was brought up. He took over the business but was not successful.

His first appearance on the stage was at the Theatre Royal, Smock Alley, Dublin, on 5 February 1744, and his engagement at once increased its prosperity. His first London appearance was made in 1746 as Othello at the Theatre Royal, Drury Lane. Here his talents were speedily recognized, and in Hamlet and Macbeth he alternated with David Garrick, arousing the latter's jealousy by his success as Romeo. This resulted in his leaving Drury Lane for the Covent Garden Theatre in 1750, accompanied by Mrs Cibber, his Juliet. Both houses now at once put on Romeo and Juliet for a series of rival performances, and Barry's Romeo was preferred by the critics to Garrick's.

In 1758, Barry opened and managed the Crow Street Theatre in Dublin (1758-66), and later a new Theatre Royal in Cork (1761). He staged many successful productions but seems to have lived beyond his means. In 1767 he returned to London to play at the Haymarket Theatre, then under the management of Foote. As his second wife, he married in 1768 the actress Mrs Dancer (1734–1801), and he and Mrs Barry played under Garrick's management, Barry appearing in 1767, after ten years absence from the London stage, in Othello, his greatest part. In 1774 they both moved to Covent Garden, where Barry remained until his death.

His son Thomas Barry became an actor at the Theatre in Cork in 1761. In 1766, he left Thomas in charge of the Theatre, but his management was heavily attacked in the press. The following year, Thomas appeared alongside his father at the Haymarket in London, before his sudden death brought an end to career. He is buried in Westminster Abbey.
