= 1769 in literature =

This article contains information about the literary events and publications of 1769.

== Events ==
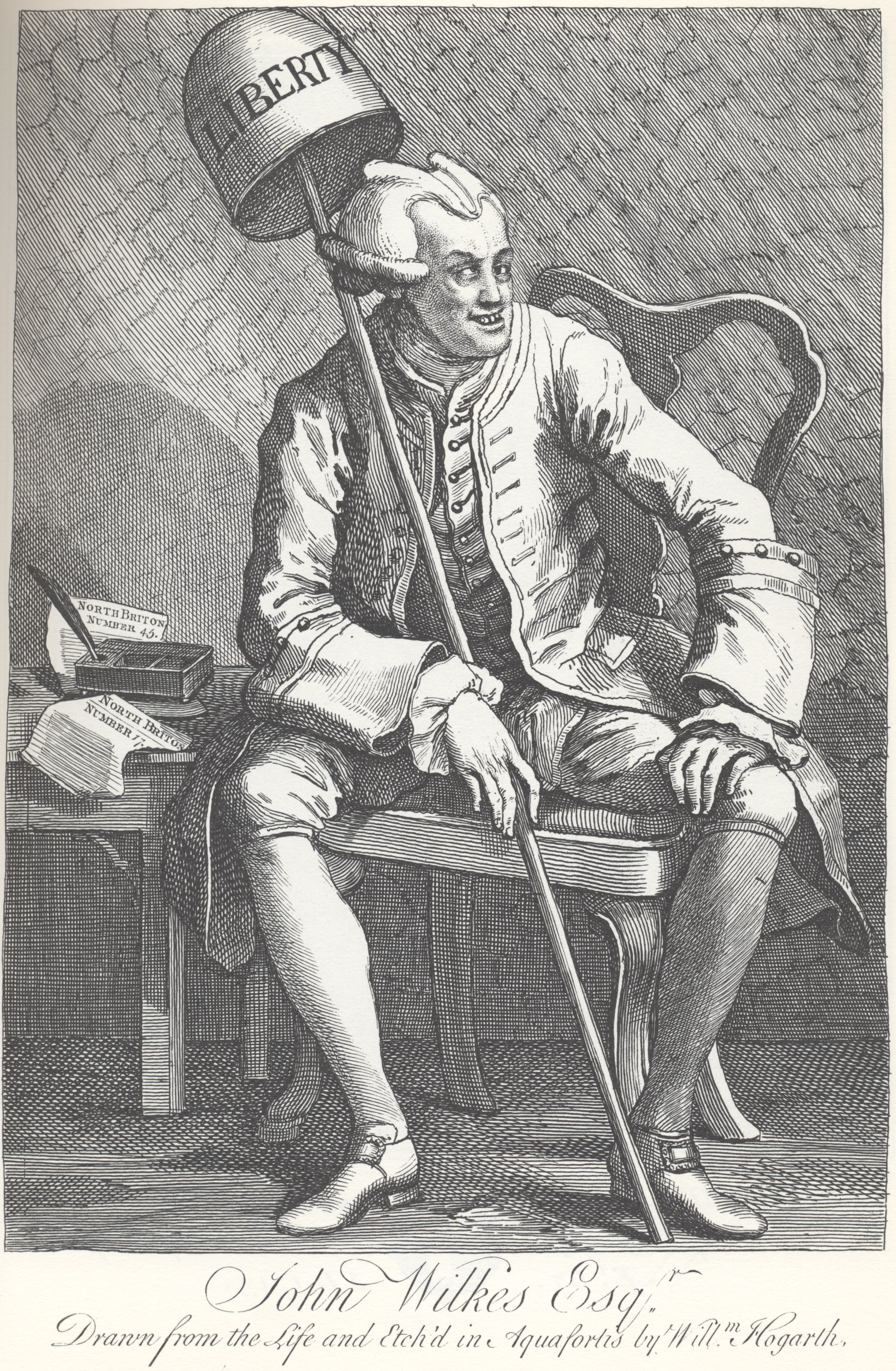
"John Wilkes Esq.", a satirical engraving by William Hogarth, who shows Wilkes with a demonic-looking wig, crossed eyes, and two editions of the Wilkes-owned newspaper The North Briton: Numbers 17 (in which he attacked, among others, Hogarth) and the famous 45

- January 21 – The first of the Letters of Junius criticising the government appears in the Public Advertiser (London). The identity of Junius remains a mystery, but modern-day scholarly consensus favours Philip Francis.
- February–April – The British radical John Wilkes is expelled from the Parliament of Great Britain three times. Parliament expelled Wilkes in February 1769, on the grounds that he was an outlaw when returned. His Middlesex constituents re-elected him in the same month with the support of John Wheble, editor of the Middlesex Journal, only to see him expelled again and re-elected in March. In April, after his expulsion and another re-election, Parliament declared his opponent, Henry Luttrell, the winner. Wilkes was said to hold his own supporters in contempt during the election campaign. E. P. Thompson, in his celebrated 1963 text The Making of the English Working Class wrote: “‘Do you suppose’ it is said that he asked his opponent, Colonel Luttrell, while watching the cheering throngs on the hustings, ‘that there are more fools or rogues in that assembly?’”
- May – One of 16-year-old Thomas Chatterton's poems attributed to the imaginary medieval monk "Thomas Rowley" – Elinoure and Juga – first appears in Archibald Hamilton's Town and Country Magazine. This year also Chatterton sends specimens of "Rowley"'s poetry and history The Ryse of Peyncteynge yn Englade to Horace Walpole, who at first offers to print them, but discovering Chatterton's age, rightly considers they may be forgeries and scornfully dismisses him.
- September 5–7 – English actor-manager David Garrick stages a Shakespeare Jubilee festival in Stratford-upon-Avon (with no performances of Shakespeare's works). On October 14 a version opens at the Theatre Royal, Drury Lane in London as The Jubilee.
- unknown date
  - Jean-François Ducis stages his version of William Shakespeare's Hamlet in Paris.
  - Jean-Jacques Rousseau completes the Confessions.

== New books ==
=== Fiction ===
- Elizabeth Bonhôte – Hortensia, or, The Distressed Wife
- Frances Brooke – The History of Emily Montague (the first novel written in Canada)
- Elizabeth Griffith – The Delicate Distress (published together with Richard Griffith – The Gordian Knot)
- Charles Jenner – The Placid Man
- Susannah Minifie – The Cottage
- Nicolas-Edme Rétif – Le Pied de Fanchette
- Tobias Smollett – The History and Adventures of an Atom
- William Tooke – The Loves of Othniel and Achsah

=== Poetry ===
- Basílio da Gama – O Uraguai
- Thomas Gray – Ode Performed in the Senate-House at Cambridge
- Clara Reeve – Poems

=== Drama ===
- Mary Bowes, Countess of Strathmore and Kinghorne – The Siege of Jerusalem (published)
- Richard Cumberland – The Brothers
- Ramón de la Cruz – El Manolo
- Alexander Dow – Zingis
- Jean-François Ducis – Hamlet (an adaptation of Shakespeare)
- David Garrick – The Jubilee
- Elizabeth Griffith – The School for Rakes (an adaptation of Beaumarchais' Eugenie)
- John Home – The Fatal Discovery
- Charlotte Lennox – The Sister

=== Non-fiction ===
- William Blackstone – A Reply to Dr. Priestley
- Charles Bonnet – Palingénésie philosophique
- William Buchan – Domestic Medicine
- Edmund Burke – Observations on a Late State of the Nation
- Charles Burney – An Essay Towards a History of the Principal Comets that have Appeared Since 1742
- William Falconer – An Universal Dictionary of the Marine
- Adam Ferguson – Institutes of Moral Philosophy
- Junius
  - The Political Contest i–ii
  - The Letters from Junius to the D***of G***** (Duke of Grafton)
- Oliver Goldsmith – The Roman History (textbook)
- James Granger – Biographical History of England from Egbert the Great to the Revolution
- Johann Gottfried Herder – Kritische Wälder
- Elizabeth Montagu – An Essay on the Writings and Genius of Shakespear
- Nicolas-Edme Rétif – Le Pornographe
- Joshua Reynolds – A Discourse
- William Robertson – The History of the Reign of the Emperor Charles V
- Laurence Sterne
  - A Political Romance
  - Sermons by the Late Rev. Mr. Sterne

== Births ==
- January 1 – Jane Marcet, née Haldimand, English science writer (died 1858)
- February 9 – Susette Borkenstein Gontard, German lover of poet Friedrich Hölderlin (died 1802)
- March 7 – Richmal Mangnall, English schoolbook writer (died 1820)
- May 21 – John Hookham Frere, English diplomat and author (died 1846)
- September 9 (August 29 O.S.) – Ivan Kotliarevsky, Ukrainian writer (died 1838)
- September 14 – Alexander von Humboldt, German explorer, natural philosopher and educator (died 1859)
- November 12 – Amelia Opie, English novelist (died 1853)
- December 7 (baptised) – Ann Batten Cristall, English poet (died 1848)
- December 26 – Ernst Moritz Arndt, German patriotic author and poet (died 1860)

== Deaths ==
- January 5 – James Merrick, English poet and scholar (born 1720)
- February 26 – William Duncombe, English dramatist and author (born 1690)
- March 28 – Samuel Derrick, British hack writer (born 1724)
- July – Goronwy Owen, Welsh-language poet (born 1723)
- October 25 – Owen Ruffhead, English miscellanist and editor (born 1723)
- December 13 – Christian Fürchtegott Gellert, German poet (born 1715)
- December 16 – Lady Elizabeth Germain, English philanthropist, correspondent of Jonathan Swift (born 1680)
