= The Double Mistake =

- Original language: English
- Written by: Elizabeth Griffith
- Genre: Comedy

Premiere
- Date: 9 January 1766
- Place: Covent Garden Theatre, London

The Double Mistake is a 1766 comedy play by the British writer Elizabeth Griffith. It was her most successful play along with The School for Rakes.

The original Covent Garden cast included David Ross as Lord Belmont, William Smith as Sir Charles Somerville, Thomas Hull as Elder Freeman, Isabella Mattocks as Emily and Maria Macklin as Lady Mary, Mary Bulkley as Lady Louisa and John Cushing as Servant.

== Bibliography ==
- Baines, Paul & Ferarro, Julian & Rogers, Pat. The Wiley-Blackwell Encyclopedia of Eighteenth-Century Writers and Writing, 1660-1789. Wiley-Blackwell, 2011.
- Birch, Dinah & Drabble, Margaret. The Oxford Companion to English Literature. OUP Oxford, 2009.
- Watson, George. The New Cambridge Bibliography of English Literature: Volume 2, 1660-1800. Cambridge University Press, 1971.
