= The Packet (novel) =

1794 novel by Elizabeth Gunning

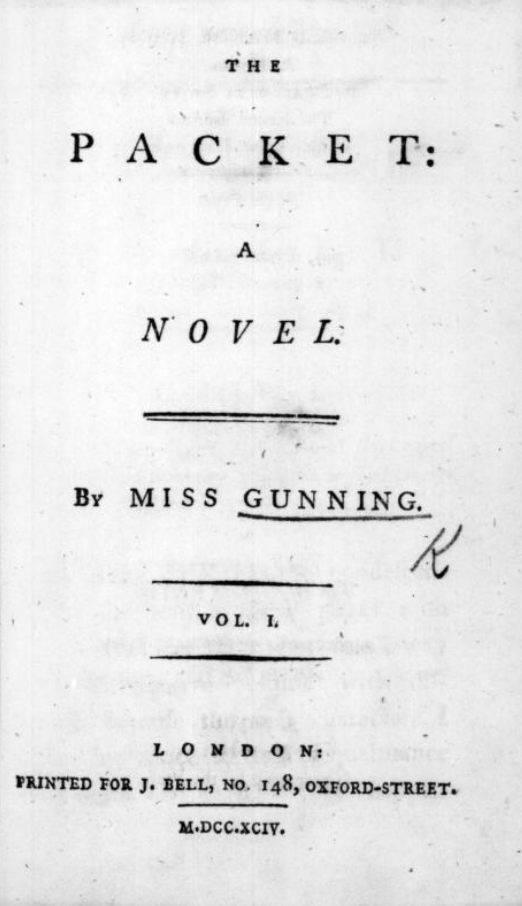
- Author: Elizabeth Gunning
- Publisher: Joseph Bell
- Publication date: 1794

The Packet is a 1794 novel by Elizabeth Gunning. The plot focuses on the virtuous aristocratic Montreville family, and the malicious schemes of Sir Thomas Montreville's cousin Mrs. Johnson. Mrs. Johnson imprisons Sir Thomas's kindhearted daughter Adelaide in a plot for her son to inherit a fortune, but the local parson rescues her and the novel ends happily.

The Packet was Gunning's first novel; she contracted with the publisher Joseph Bell for a four-volume novel, accidentally wrote more than was required, and removed a subplot to publish it as her second novel Lord Fitzhenry (1794). The Packet was published three years after a pamphlet war had made Gunning the notorious subject of a scandal.

Gunning and her mother were accused of forging letters in a scheme to secure a marriage to an aristocrat; Gunning denied the accusations, and used The Packet to express her innocence and frustration. The narrator of The Packet frequently offers digressive commentary, often alluding to Gunning's personal experiences. Reviews in 1794 praised the appealing, "easy" style of this commentary, and the moral virtue of the aristocratic characters. The novel's impact faded after Gunning's death in 1823. The modern literary critic Pam Perkins describes it as "no lost masterpiece—it is a conventionally plotted melodrama, competently written."

== Synopsis ==
The novel opens with the discovery of a packet—a bundle of papers tied with black ribbon—which shocks the local parson. The narrative then moves eighteen months prior, to the Montreville family living happily in their English castle: Sir Thomas, his wife Lady Gertrude, and their children William and Adelaide. Sir Thomas invites his grandmother Mrs. Osborn to move in, and she changes her will to disinherit her great-grandson Edmund Johnson in favour of Adelaide. Jealous, Edmund's mother Mrs. Johnson manipulates Sir Thomas into sending Adelaide abroad with her. Mrs. Osborn dies. Sir Thomas also dies. A letter from France announces Adelaide's death from consumption.

The Johnsons return with Adelaide's body for the funeral, but are not welcome at the Montreville castle. Mrs. Johnson loses the titular packet (contents still mysterious) in the woods. The neighbouring family of the Davenports is introduced; William is in love with Emeline Davenport, and Adelaide with Montague Davenport. The Davenports have been in Ireland for several months to settle an inheritance dispute. Montague learns of Adelaide's death, and becomes dangerously ill. He insists on returning to England so he can die near Adelaide's tomb. On arrival, Montague's health improves, though he and Lady Gertrude spend most of their time mourning together.

The local parson suddenly departs, then writes to say that he has rescued a young woman who was imprisoned in a foreign mountain cave. The reader finally discovers the contents of the packet: it contains evidence that Mrs. Johnson imprisoned Adelaide and faked her death. The parson returns with the rescued Adelaide. William's friend Lord Fitzhenry arrives seeking help after a duel, and hides in the castle under a false name; his story forms the subject of Gunning's next novel. Mrs. Johnson flees to France, Edmund reconciles with the Montrevilles and returns Adelaide's inheritance, and the novel ends with a happy double wedding between the Montrevilles and the Davenports.

== Background ==
Gunning was the only child of the writer Susannah Gunning, who was a major influence on her writing style. Before becoming a writer herself, Gunning was the subject of a scandal and pamphlet war in 1790 and 1791. For several months, London society debated whether she had tried to secure a social-climbing marriage to George Campbell (heir to the Duke of Argyll) or Lord Blandford (heir to the Duke of Marlborough). Forged letters purportedly from Blandford and his father were published, and Gunning and her mother were accused of the forgery. Gunning's mother published a novelistic account of the scandal, accusing her husband of trying to pin the capital offense of forgery on his innocent daughter. The scandal ruined Gunning's marriage prospects, and after a temporary retreat to France with her mother to avoid the public eye, she turned to writing to support herself.

The Packet was published by Joseph Bell in 1794. It was Gunning's first novel, and its publication demonstrated her professional approach to writing as a career. Unlike many writers who wrote "on speculation"—completing a manuscript first and then attempting to sell it to a publisher—Gunning secured a contract for a four volume novel and then began to write. When she discovered that she had written more than four volumes, she removed the extra material to be sold a second time as a new book, Lord Fitzhenry. The vast majority of novels in this period were published anonymously, but The Packet is published with Gunning's highly-recognizable name on the title page, using her notoriety as a form of marketing. Gunning went on to have a prolific writing career, and continued to advertise her works with "Miss Gunning" on the title page even after her marriage in 1803.

== Style ==
Intermingled with the plot of the novel, the narrator frequently provides commentary and digressions, often alluding to Gunning's personal experiences. This narrative technique of breaking the fourth wall was common in eighteenth-century novels. Many of the narrator's asides represent Gunning's first published commentary on her public scandal three years prior. For example, after praising the moral virtue of feminine passivity, the narrator says: "The best way to secure ourselves against a charge of folly, is certainly not to commit foolish actions, or write foolish things, and yet I have reason to know from experience, that our best caution will not always avail, as there are people in the world ready to do and to write, and afterwards to say that you did it, or you wrote it." Other comments express a vindictive desire that her story of persecuted innocence will inspire guilt and shame in her critics.

== Reception ==
The novel was reviewed by The British Critic and The Critical Review in 1794. The British Critic praises the novel's characters, especially their personal virtues. The reviewer quotes the opening scene, in which loyal servants undertake humble gardening work, with the approving comment that "[h]ere is nature, good morality, and good language." They also praise the "easy" and "naïve" style of the narrator, "which denotes genius, and has throughout a pleasing effect." The Critical Review gives a similar assessment of her narrative style, commenting that "[t]he language though not elegant, nor every where free from colloquial inaccuracies, is easy". The reviewer also approves that "virtuous feelings are called forth throughout the whole work", and adds praise of the work's emotional impact: "the tale is pathetic, and the catastrophe strongly interests the feelings". To this praise The Critical Review adds several criticisms. Of the plot structure, they complain that "[t]he story is, indeed, told in two [sic] diffuse a manner, and mixed up with much alloy, which diminishes its value"; of the narrator's discursive style, they advise "we must beg the fair author to endeavour to forget herself, if she wishes to interest us in her characters"; and in response to the geographical accuracy of some scenes set outside of England, they comment "[w]e would likewise put her in mind that travelling amongst the Alps is not quite like travelling on English turnpike roads". Their overall assessment is expressed with the review's opening line: "This is, if we understand aright, this lady's first appearance as a novel writer; and, with that circumstance in our view, we think that she has acquitted herself with credit."

Like all of Gunning's writing, The Packet was forgotten soon after her death in 1823. The modern literary critic Pam Perkins describes the novel as largely pedestrian: "The Packet is no lost masterpiece—it is a conventionally plotted melodrama, competently written." For Perkins, the main interest of the novel is the context it provides for Gunning's narrativization of her experiences as a woman writer.
