= Lord Fitzhenry =

1794 novel by Elizabeth Gunning

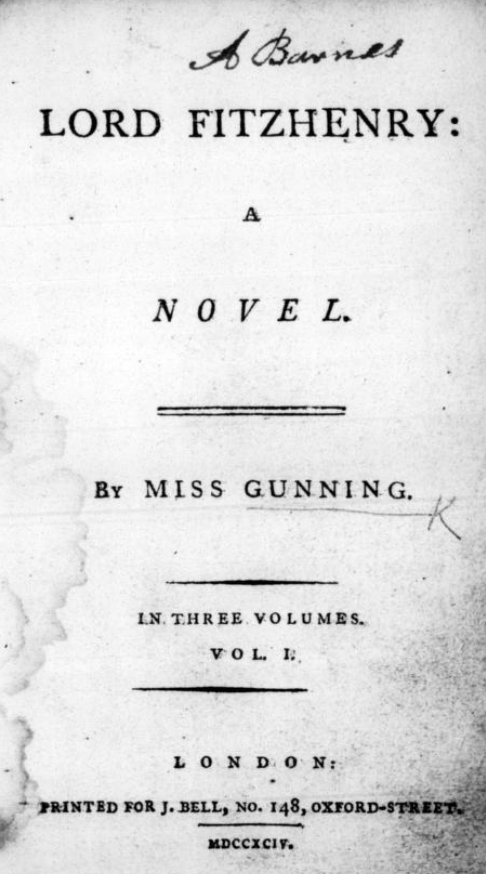
- First edition title page
- Author: Elizabeth Gunning
- Publisher: Joseph Bell
- Publication date: December 1794

Lord Fitzhenry is a 1794 novel by English writer and translator Elizabeth Gunning. Its marriage plot follows a young English aristocrat who falls in love with his friend's fiancee; he attempts to resist his feelings out of respect for his friend and because he cannot marry a Catholic. Eventually, he discovers that she is in fact his long-lost (Protestant) cousin, and that his friend would prefer to marry someone else, allowing the novel to end happily with multiple weddings. The story was originally developed as a subplot in her first novel, The Packet (1794), but Gunning sold it as a standalone novel to avoid over-delivering on her contract to write four volumes for The Packet. Reviews of the novel in December 1794 praised Gunning's character development and lively prose.

== Synopsis ==
=== Events in The Packet ===
Lord Fitzhenry, a young English aristocrat, first appears in Gunning's previous novel as a friend of the novel's protagonist, William Montreville. They meet by chance in Calais, where Fitzhenry is mysteriously distressed. Fitzhenry delivers the news that William's sister has died, and escorts him back to his family castle in England. Later, he reappears under the false name Jack Robertson. He fears that a recent duel may have been fatal for his opponent, and hides in the Montreville castle to avoid prosecution. This appearance overlaps with the events of volume three of Lord Fitzhenry.

=== Lord Fitzhenry ===
Fitzhenry visits his friend Frederic Wardour in Wales. Wardour is engaged to a Miss Melmoth, but is in love with someone else. Fitzhenry falls in love at first sight with Miss Melmoth, but vows to resist his feelings. Fitzhenry is introduced to a wealthy but unsophisticated nouveau riche heiress, Miss Clarinda Owens. Miss Owens' unpleasant mother tries to encourage a marriage, but Fitzhenry is not interested. Fitzhenry relates a long inserted tale of his aunt's unhappiness married to Lord Hillford, a Catholic who tried to force her to convert; among other cruelties, he separated her from their child. Fitzhenry's father vowed never to allow his children to marry Catholics, another bar between Fitzhenry's relationship with Miss Melmoth (a Catholic).

After some time rejecting additional romantic prospects in London, Fitzhenry travels to France for his grand tour, accompanied by Mr. Courtenay (the great-nephew of his aunt's former Protestant chaplain, Dr. Burnett). Fitzhenry learns that both his sisters have suitors: Wardour is in love with Fitzhenry's sister Elizabeth, while Mr. Courtenay is in love with his sister Jemima. In Naples, Fitzhenry visits his unhappy aunt, Lady Hillford; to his surprise, Miss Melmoth is living with her and Lord Hillford. Fitzhenry learns that Miss Melmoth is secretly Lady Olivia, the daughter of an aristocrat. With his aunt's assistance, he proposes, and Olivia accepts.

Lord Hillford opposes Fitzhenry's connection to Olivia, and tries to have Fitzhenry assassinated. Twice, Fitzhenry kills the assassins; he then flees back to England. Meanwhile, Olivia has disappeared; Fitzhenry searches for her. Fitzhenry duels Wardour in mistaken jealousy over Olivia. Lord Hillford is murdered by his hired assassins. An Italian priest reveals that Olivia is Lady Hillford's long-lost daughter, and therefore actually of Protestant heritage. The novel ends with a happy triple wedding: Fitzhenry marries his cousin Olivia, while Wardour and Mr. Courtenay marry Fitzhenry's sisters.

== Composition and publication ==
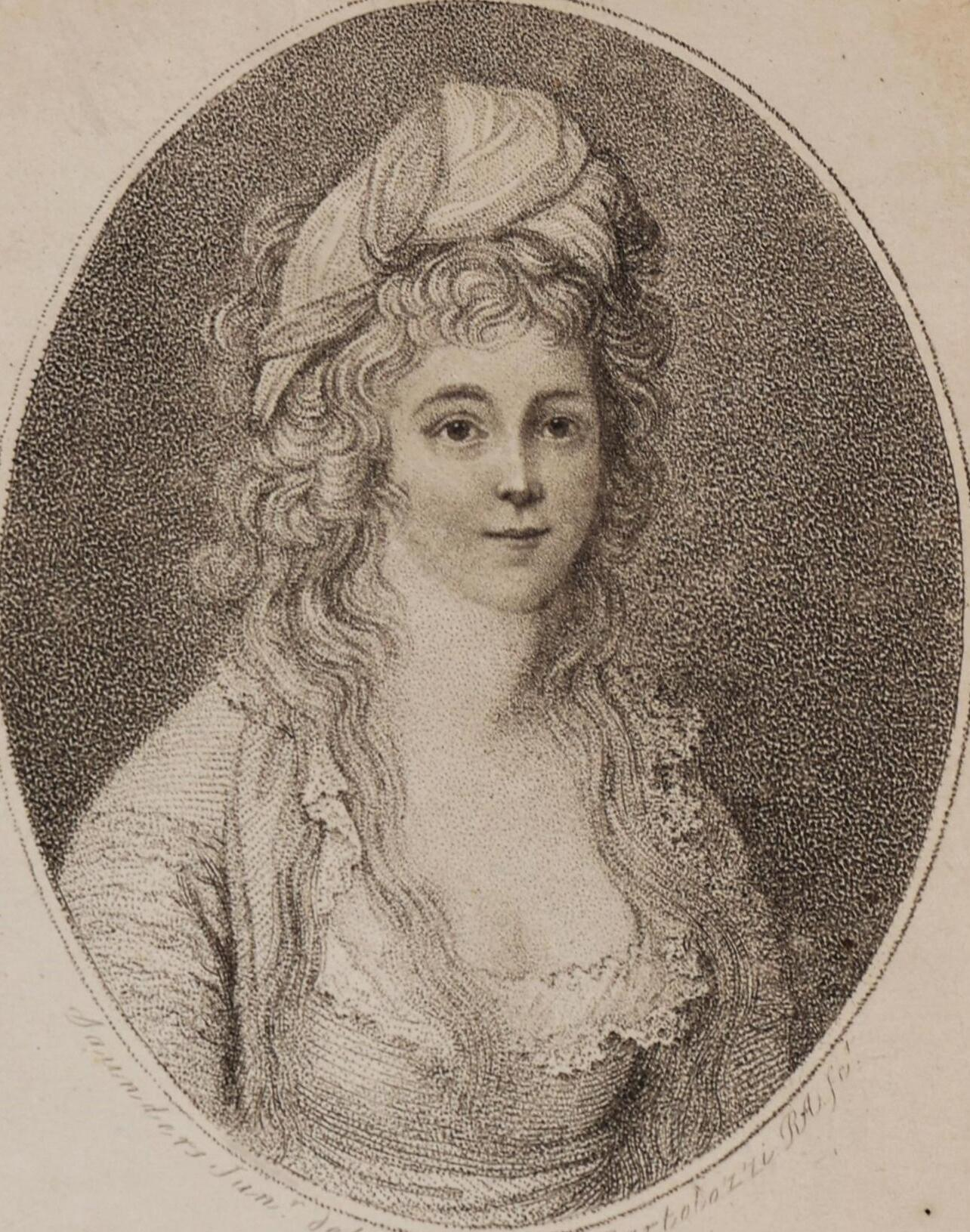
1796 portrait of Elizabeth Gunning

Elizabeth Gunning began her career as a professional writer in 1794, after a scandal in 1791 ruined her prospects of making an aristocratic marriage. Gunning and her mother, Susannah Gunning, were accused of forgery (a capital offense) after circulating love letters purportedly between Gunning and Lord Blandford, to whom Gunning claimed to be engaged. They were both ejected from the household of Gunning's father, and after a brief stay in France to avoid the public eye, both turned to writing as a means of financial support. Gunning's mother Susannah already had an established career as a novelist, and Gunning followed her in becoming a prolific but not renowned author of sentimental fiction.

Lord Fitzhenry was originally intended to form part of her first novel, The Packet (published earlier in 1794) but was expanded into a standalone work instead. Gunning's contract with her publisher for The Packet specified that she would write them a four-volume work; when her story began to exceed that length, she split out a subplot so she could be paid for two novels instead. Lord Fitzhenry's story in The Packet ends on a cliffhanger, with the character wondering if he has killed his friend in a duel, and Gunning included a note suggesting readers should read her next book to see how his story concludes. (Note: Her full footnote reads: "It is in this place, reader, that I am forced to make an apology for my own heedlessness—I told you in the beginning of these volumes, that I should let you know hereafter what had so much discomposed Lord Fitzhenry when he was encountered by Sir William Montreville at Calais. I was really as good as my word: but being no adept in calculation, and this my first attempt at composing a book, I found, on dividing the fruits of my labour into volumes, that instead of four, for which I had agreed with my publisher, I had sheets enough scribbled over for six, and no other possible way of reducing the number than by taking out every word of Lord Fitzhenry's history: not that I mean to consign such interesting memoirs to oblivion; on the contrary, should I continue to feel the hard hand of oppression, the weight of that most unjust pressure which has made me turn novel-writer—Lord Fitzhenry, in two volumes, will produce me at least one sort of comfort.") Lord Fitzhenry also includes a few notes suggesting that readers should buy The Packet for the full backstory of some plot developments. The literary historian Pam Perkins describes Gunning's publication decisions as those of a savvy professional, despite her preface to The Packet claiming she was a reluctant amateur. One reviewer of The Packet complained about the publishing choice, saying: "we are promised another novel from the same hand; to be built upon an episodical story in these volumes, which, by the way, we protest against as an injudicious mode of a new publication". Lord Fitzhenry was first published as a three-volume book in London by Joseph Bell in 1794, followed by a two-volume Dublin edition the same year.

== Contemporary reception ==
The novel was reviewed in the December 1794 editions of The Critical Review and The British Critic. The Critical Review praised the "vivacity" of Gunning's prose and the "ingenious" plot structure, and expressed satisfaction with the story's happy ending. The British Critic had more quibbles with the plot, criticizing the inclusion of a duel in which Fitzhenry is "too glaringly in the wrong" and the death of the chaplain Dr. Burnett, which "produces no effect". (Note: Dr. Burnett dies at the beginning of volume three, causing Mr. Courtenay to return to England early and leave Fitzroy alone in Italy.) Nonetheless, the reviewer praised the work as a whole, saying that "Miss Gunning continues to bear away the palm from most of her rivals, by unaffected, original, simplicity, and liveliness of narration". They highlight the "correctness" of Gunning's depiction of aristocratic life, especially the amusing contrast between Lady Owen's vulgarity and the other characters' elegance.

== Later analysis ==
The literary scholar Kate Rumbold mentions Lord Fitzhenry as an example of "banal Shakespeare" in the eighteenth century. As a newly re-popularized figure of English literature, Shakespeare was widely quoted in eighteenth-century literature, often to the point of cliché. Lord Fitzhenry is one of many novels in which a character quotes the line "Angels and Ministers of Grace defend us" from Hamlet as an exclamation of surprise, diluting its originally-tragic impact; it is used as a greeting between long-lost acquaintances.

In Reading Smell in Eighteenth-Century Fiction, Emily C. Friedman describes Miss Owens' ostentatious but unnecessary use of smelling salts as a sign for eighteenth-century readers of her character flaws: she displays the accessories of the culture of sensibility, but her lack of personal response signals that she is in fact an unempathetic person.
