= Thomas Griffith (actor) =

Irish stage actor and theatre manager

Thomas Griffith (1680 – 23 January 1744) was an Irish stage actor and theatre manager.

Griffith was born in Dublin and was of Welsh descent. While working as an apprentice in the city he was recruited by Joseph Ashbury of the Smock Alley Theatre. While there he became friends with his fellow actor Robert Wilks, who was likely responsible for encouraging him to perform in London. While he did make occasional appearances in London, most of his stage career was spent in Dublin. From 1721 to 1729 he was Master of the Revels in Ireland.

He became manager of the Smock Alley, before later departing to establish the rival Aungier Street Theatre in 1734. In 1743 the rivals merged to form a united company performing a both playhouses. This was strongly opposed by star actor Thomas Sheridan, who departed for Drury Lane. Not long afterwards Griffith died on 23 January 1744.

His daughter was the actress and playwright Elizabeth Griffith. His son Richard became an actor in David Garrick's Drury Lane Company.

== Bibliography ==
- Greene, John C. & Clark, Gladys L. H. The Dublin Stage, 1720-1745: A Calendar of Plays, Entertainments, and Afterpiece. Lehigh University Press, 1993.
- Highfill, Philip H, Burnim, Kalman A. & Langhans, Edward A. A Biographical Dictionary of Actors, Actresses, Musicians, Dancers, Managers, and Other Stage Personnel in London, 1660-1800: Garrick to Gyngell. SIU Press, 1978.
