= Elizabeth Griffith =

Welsh-born dramatist, fiction writer, essayist and actress

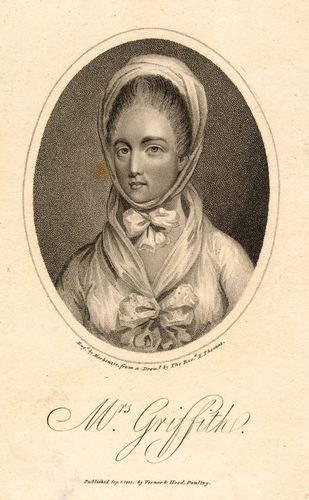
Elizabeth Griffith

Elizabeth Griffith (1727 – 5 January 1793) was an 18th-century Welsh-born dramatist, fiction writer, essayist and actress, who lived and worked in Ireland.

== Biography ==
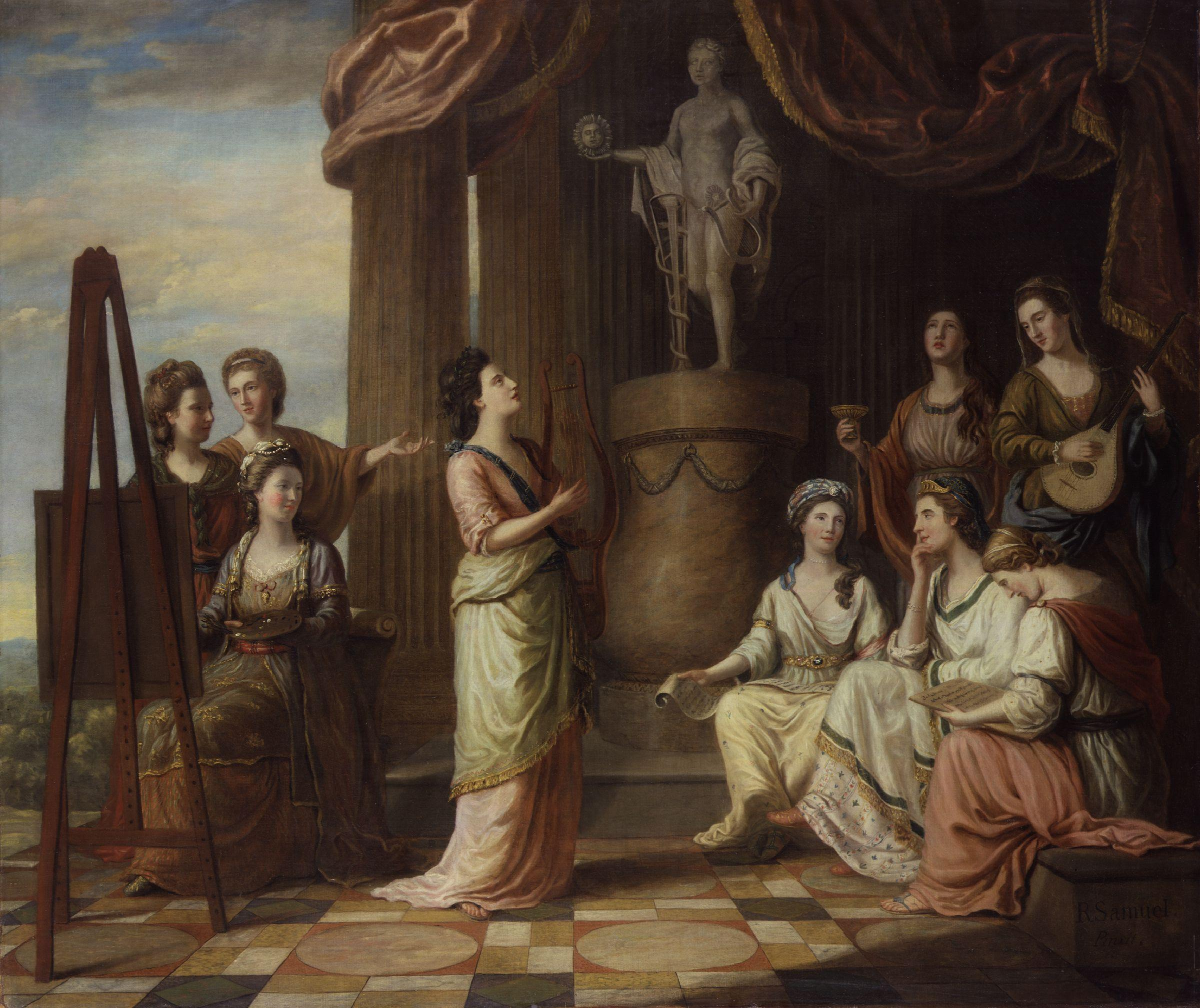
1778 painting of the Blue Stockings Society showing Griffith sitting first from right

Elizabeth Griffith was born in Glamorgan, Wales, to Dublin theater manager Thomas Griffith and Jane Foxcroft Griffith on 11 October 1727. "The family settled in Dublin, where they brought up Elizabeth to be a sociable child, cheerful and at ease among the theatrical community". In addition to giving her access to the theatre-world, Thomas Griffith educated Elizabeth in French and English literature. Her father died in 1744, which led to economic hardship for the family. Her Dublin acting debut took place on 13 October 1749, when she played Juliet to a considerably older Romeo played by Thomas Sheridan at the Smock Alley Theatre. Griffith specialized in tragic roles, such as Jane Shore in Nicholas Rowe's The Tragedy of Jane Shore and Cordelia in King Lear.

Elizabeth met her kinsman and future husband, Richard Griffith, in 1746. On 12 May 1751, witnessed by Lady Orrery, they married in secret. Elizabeth gave birth to two children, Catherine and Richard. Through her son, her descendants included Australian politician Arthur Hill Griffith, who was her grandson, and French-Canadian actress Jessica Paré.

Elizabeth and Richard's five year courtship provided the basis for her first publication, A Series of Genuine Letters Between Henry and Frances, published in six volumes between 1757 and 1770. The letters include many references to "literary and philosophical subjects of mutual interest, like the letters of Jonathan Swift and Alexander Pope or Cicero's Offices"; Griffith valued the opportunity to build upon her education. Letters between Henry and Frances was an immediate success that generated fame but not wealth for both writers. Richard traveled after the couple married and was absent for extended periods. He borrowed a large sum of money to develop a linen manufactory, which went bankrupt in 1756. During this time, and while Richard was avoiding debtor's court, income generated by Griffith's writing sustained the family. Griffith continued her acting career at Covent Garden, in London, from 1753 to 1755, though she never played more than minor characters.

Capitalizing on the initial success of the Letters, Elizabeth translated many French works and plays. Between 1764 and 1769, she wrote four plays with varying degrees of success. Griffith's third play, The Double Mistake (1766) was well received at Covent Garden, which emboldened her to approach David Garrick for help staging her next play. Griffith collaborated with Garrick to produce her most successful comedy, The School for Rakes, in 1769. While the two had a tumultuous relationship, Garrick's influence on Griffith was clear. After his death, in the advertisement for the print publication for The Times, Griffith attributed the "first idea of this piece" to the late Garrick. While she praised Garrick as a primary influence, the connections she made at Smock Alley Theater in Dublin contributed more to the play's production. Richard Brinsley Sheridan, the son of her acting mentor Thomas Sheridan, produced The Times, at Drury Lane. While her fame was not the direct result of her acting career, Griffith's theatrical connections were invaluable to her success.

Elizabeth Griffith's literary production was steady from 1760 to 1779, garnering her significant notoriety in the literary circles of London. She published essays, epistolary novels, novelettes, translations, and literary criticism. As a hard-working professional writer she produced a large body of diverse works. The last decade of her life was free of the financial struggles she and her husband had endured throughout their marriage.

Griffith's son worked for the East India Company as an accountant, and returned to Ireland in 1786 a wealthy man. He settled at Millicent House in Kildare, and Griffith and her husband lived out the rest of their days at this residence. Griffith died at Millicent House in 1793.

== Works ==
Griffith wrote a number of comedies for the theater, five of which were performed: The Platonic Wife (1765), The Double Mistake (1766, though some scholarship questions her authorship of this text), The School for Rakes (1769, an adaption of Beaumarchais's Eugénie), A Wife in the Right (1772, also known as Patience the Best Remedy), and The Times (1779). Of these plays, The School for Rakes was the most popular, and earned Elizabeth enough money to place her son into the East India Company.

She also published two non-fiction texts. The Morality of Shakespeare's Drama Illustrated (1775) was an extensive critical commentary on Shakespeare's plays. In her preface she claims that Elizabeth Montagu in her Essay on the Writings and Genius of Shakespeare inspired her attempt to defend Shakespeare against Voltaire. Griffith's 529 page tome is significant as it is one of the earliest statements, with Montagu's, on the national importance of Shakespeare. The second, Essays, Addressed to Young Married Women (1782), was published posthumously in the United States as Letters Addressed to Young Married Women (1796). This collection of essays conveyed advice on child rearing, gender roles, and financial responsibility.

Griffith earned money for her family through translation work, translating from French into English. Her work included predominantly memoirs and collections of letters by people like Ninon de l'Enclos, Marthe-Marguerite, Marquise de Caylus, and even Voltaire. She also translated some French novels, such as The Princess of Cleves: An Historical Novel by Marie-Madeleine, comtesse de La Fayette and Les Malheurs de l'inconstance by Claude Joseph Dorat.

Griffith was first and perhaps best known as a novelist. The Delicate Distress (1769) was published alongside a work of her husband's, a novel titled The Gordian Knot (1769), in a four-volume set. Her format of choice for her fiction was the epistolary novel, as in both The History of Lady Barton (1771) and The Story of Lady Juliana Harley (1776). She also published one dramatic poem, Amana (1764).

== Themes and connections ==
Though Griffith's first plays were deeply critical of the treatment of women, her work underwent a shift soon after her move to London. Griffith found herself attacked by London critics, and she was seen as audacious for demanding respect for women. The need to earn money to support her husband and children led her to conform to audience preferences.

After this shift, Griffith's main focus became the domestic sphere. It was at this point that she abandoned the intelligent female protagonist and began to create meek, long-suffering and deeply pained female characters who bear the brunt of a traumatic life with a ne’er-do-well (and often violent) husband. From here her work became quite moralistic; for example, The Times is a critique of decadent society, and a warning against the dangers of gambling. But, though she had to package it differently in order to retain an audience, she never fully lost her focus on women's issues, and her female characters are always the moral superiors of their male counterparts. Overall, her texts focus on a need for moral development – literature as didactic – and she tends to use her female characters as the barometer of moral correctness.

Griffith did not see herself as alone in this moral quest. She edited a collection of female dramatists such as Eliza Haywood and Aphra Behn. Though these women's plays were at the time linked to sexual immorality, Griffith argued instead that these women were instructional dramatists who were trying to teach the world about proper morality. This was likely the first reassessing of Behn's work particularly, but that of women writers in general, and illustrates the important premium Griffith placed upon proper morality.

== Contemporary reception ==
In her own lifetime, Griffith was probably best regarded for the letters between her and her husband that were published over six volumes. A Series of Genuine Letters between Henry and Frances (1757–1770) was a celebrated series that featured the edited letters of Mr. and Mrs. Griffith as they moved through courtship to marriage. In the "letters", genuine sentimentality is the mode of discourse, and women seem to have been drawn to Griffith as a model of womanhood, illustrating sought-after traits such as intelligence, reflection, and humour. Frances Burney wrote in her journal that the Letters "are doubly pleasing, charming to me, for being genuine—they have encreased my relish for minute, heartfelt writing, and encouraged me in my attempt to give an opinion of the books I read."

Her plays received mixed reviews. The Dictionary of Literary Biography states that reviewers of productions of Griffith's work occasionally complained "about poor plotting or lack of incident," but that overall audiences were engaged by Griffith's "admirable" sentiments and morals (175). Though audiences occasionally complained that her female characters were too heavily foregrounded, Griffith's women were often serious characters with well-developed personal values. Griffith was seen as a moralist in much of her work, and was sometimes accused of being unseemly for her use of satire, as it was not considered feminine.

Griffith's least successful play was A wife in the Right, which opened on 9 March 1772. Following the opening performance, a second showing for the next night was announced. The crowd responded with "shouts for and against [...] apples and half-pence were thrown, a chandelier broken", and the performance was cancelled. This unexpected setback forced Griffith to publish the play by subscription; the subscribers included Gertrude Russell, Duchess of Bedford, Edmund Burke, James Boswell, Elizabeth Montagu, and Sir Joshua Reynolds.

== Recent research ==
According to the Dictionary of Literary Biography, modern historians of drama have generally considered Griffith's plays "undistinguished, often dramatically inept and tediously sententious" (175). Modern readers often feel uncomfortable with the conflicting relationship between women's ability and wifely duty and the general tone of subordination to men encompassed within the play.

Though there remains very little scholarly work on Griffith's life and literature, her body of work represents both an interesting life and an illustration of the struggles of an ordinary woman of modest means attempting to make a career for herself in the 18th century. While not as well known to modern times as her contemporaries (like Susanna Centlivre), she was certainly a prolific writer in her own period and had made her name in the literary world by the time of her death.
