= Soft Flowing Avon =

1769 song by Thomas Arne

"Soft Flowing Avon" is a 1769 song with music written by Thomas Arne and lyrics by David Garrick. It was composed for and first staged at the Shakespeare Jubilee in Stratford-upon-Avon in 1769. The lyrics refer to the River Avon which flows through the town, the birthplace of William Shakespeare. The piece was later part of the Shakespeare Pageant performed at the Drury Lane Theatre. The song and the Jubilee were part of the growing culture of Bardolatry which sprang up in the eighteenth century.
