= Les Malheurs de l'inconstance =

1772 French novel

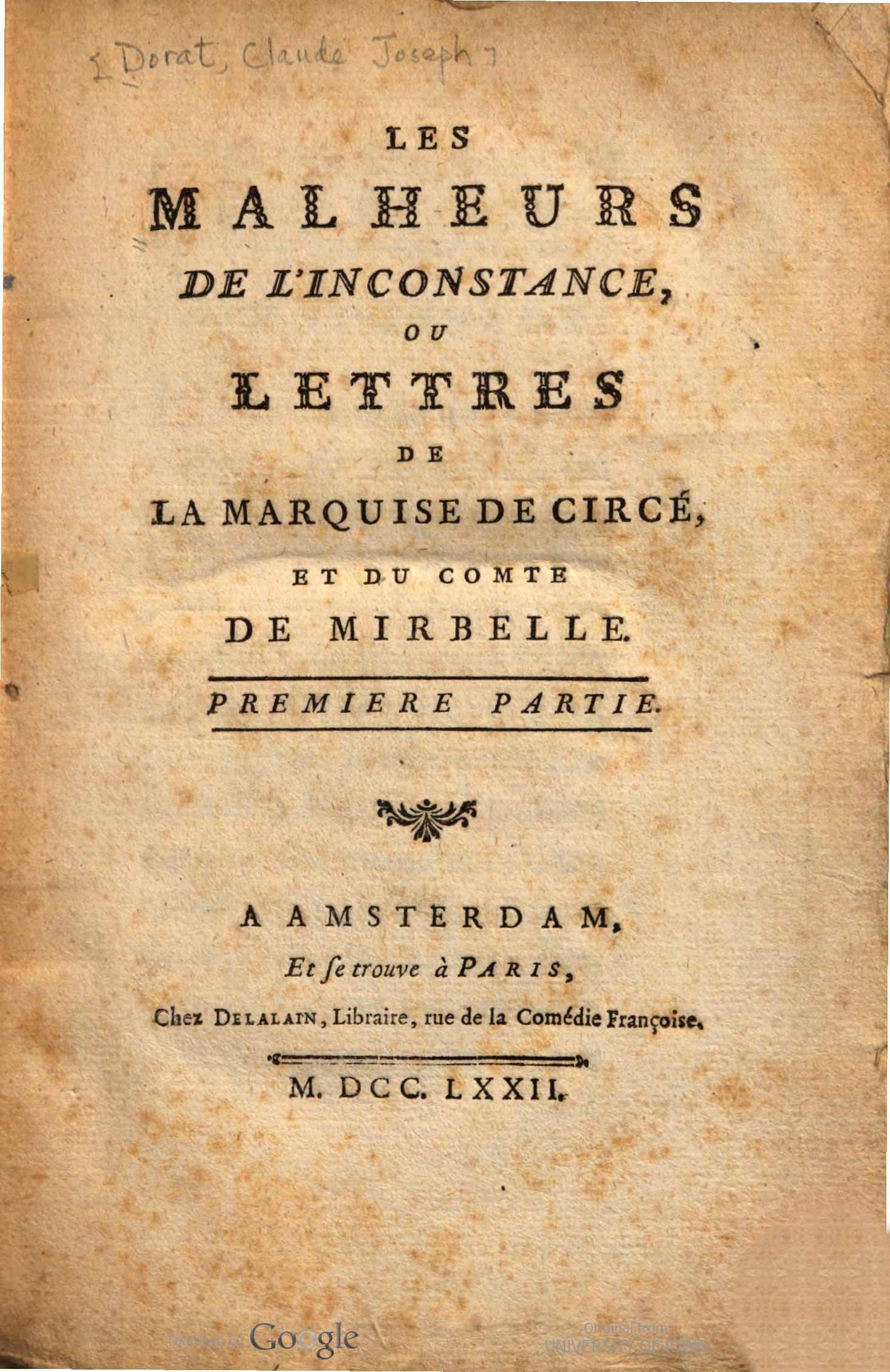
- Title page of first edition
- Author: Claude Joseph Dorat
- Translator: Elizabeth Griffith
- Language: French
- Publication date: 1772
- English publication date: 1774

Les Malheurs de l'inconstance is an epistolary novel by Claude Joseph Dorat, first published in 1772. The story follows the Count de Mirbelle, who abandons his English mistress to have an affair with the unhappily married Marquise de Syrcé; events end badly for all involved. It was translated into English as The Fatal Effects of Inconstancy by Elizabeth Griffith in 1774. In 1810, Elizabeth Gunning published another loose translation with plot alterations, which she presented as her own original work. Eighteenth-century reviewers criticized Dorat and Gunning's versions as immoral, because they depicted adultery too sympathetically and appealingly. Today, scholars consider it an interesting early example of a libertine novel, which predates the more famous 1782 novel Les Liaisons dangereuses and incorporates an unexpected "anti-libertine twist".

== Synopsis ==
Count de Mirbelle, a young military officer, is romantically attached to Lady Sidley, an English widow living near Paris who lost her family to political persecution; he is too young to legally marry, but they made vows to each other at the deathbed of Lady Sidley's mother. Meanwhile, the Duke of ***, (Note: This character name is censored with asterisks in the original text. Starting in the early eighteenth century, salacious narratives based on real gossip (known as "secret histories") were published with the names of key figures partially blanked (or "disemvowelled") to avoid accusations of libel. Novels often presented themselves as authentic memoirs because fiction was not well respected; to enhance the illusion, they blanked the names of fictional characters.) having been rejected by the beautiful and unhappily married Marquise de Syrcé, schemes to have Mirbelle seduce her as revenge. The Duke manipulates Mirbelle into publicly courting Madame de Thémines at a ball to provoke the Marquise's jealousy. The Marquise tries to hide her feelings for Mirbelle behind a facade of indifference. Seeing her rejection as a challenge to his vanity, Mirbelle grows more passionate, while his virtuous friend the Chevalier de Gérac repeatedly urges him to remain faithful to Lady Sidley. The Marquise reluctantly permits Mirbelle's escalating flirtation, violating propriety by receiving his letters and visits. She then departs for a relative's country estate to resist temptation. Believing that she is habitually unfaithful to her husband (another of the Duke's lies), Mirbelle secretly follows her there and rapes her while role-playing a sexual fantasy from one of her letters.

With her fidelity to her husband now broken, the Marquise gives in to her love for Mirbelle and they begin an extended affair. The Marquise becomes pregnant with Mirbelle's child, which she conceals from everyone, including him. Lady Sidley discovers Mirbelle's infidelity after finding one of the Marquise's love letters; she enters a convent and never speaks to him again. The Count confesses his divided loyalties to the Marquise, who releases him to return to Lady Sidley, though he refuses. The Marquise's mother learns that she has been unwell and visits; the Marquise confesses her affair, and her mother forbids Mirbelle from seeing her. He suggests running away together, but she refuses. The Marquise dies of heartbreak, along with their unborn child. In his grief and rage, Mirbelle kills the Duke in a duel. He prepares a weapon to commit suicide, but is prevented by his father. He goes into exile on a distant family estate, vowing to live in solitude and mourning.

== Publication and reception ==
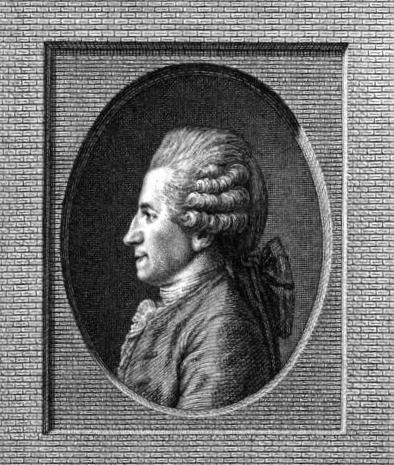
Claude Joseph Dorat, 1767 engraving

Les Malheurs de l'inconstance was first published in 1772. It was translated into English in 1774 by Elizabeth Griffith. In November of that same year, The Critical Review published a review based on Griffith's translation. The reviewer praises Dorat's effective depiction of French high society, but criticizes the novel's morality, and warns that the descriptions could make impressionable readers too sympathetic to the adulterers' conduct. The review concludes: "While ... we compliment the writer on his art, we cannot recommend the choice of his subject, and we would sooner put into the hands of our sons and daughters Prior's loosest tales, than the soft, enchanting descriptions which are to be met with in the present performance."

Dorat was a successful author in France during his lifetime, best known for his poetry. After the French Revolution, his literary style became unfashionable, because it was associated with the debauched frivolities of the aristocracy. The novel was largely forgotten. In the twentieth century, scholars rediscovered Les Malheurs de l'inconstance as an interesting and early libertine novel which serves as a precedent for the famous 1782 novel Les Liaisons dangereuses. It was republished in 1983 by Desjonquères. The literary critic Philip Stewart describes it as "a surprising work" and as "a libertine novel into which an anti-libertine twist ultimately inserts itself". The scholar Alain Clerval says: "Dorat paints a picture of the morals of the privileged whose idleness turns tragic, and the interest of the book lies, notably, in the marriage of frivolity and tragedy, in the passage from artifice to punishment." This storyline, Clerval argues, illustrates "the psychological and moral debate from which the Revolution drew its strength" because it asks whether human nature is fundamentally flawed and requires a rationalistic, enlightened society to achieve virtue.

== Dangers through Life; or, The Victim of Seduction ==
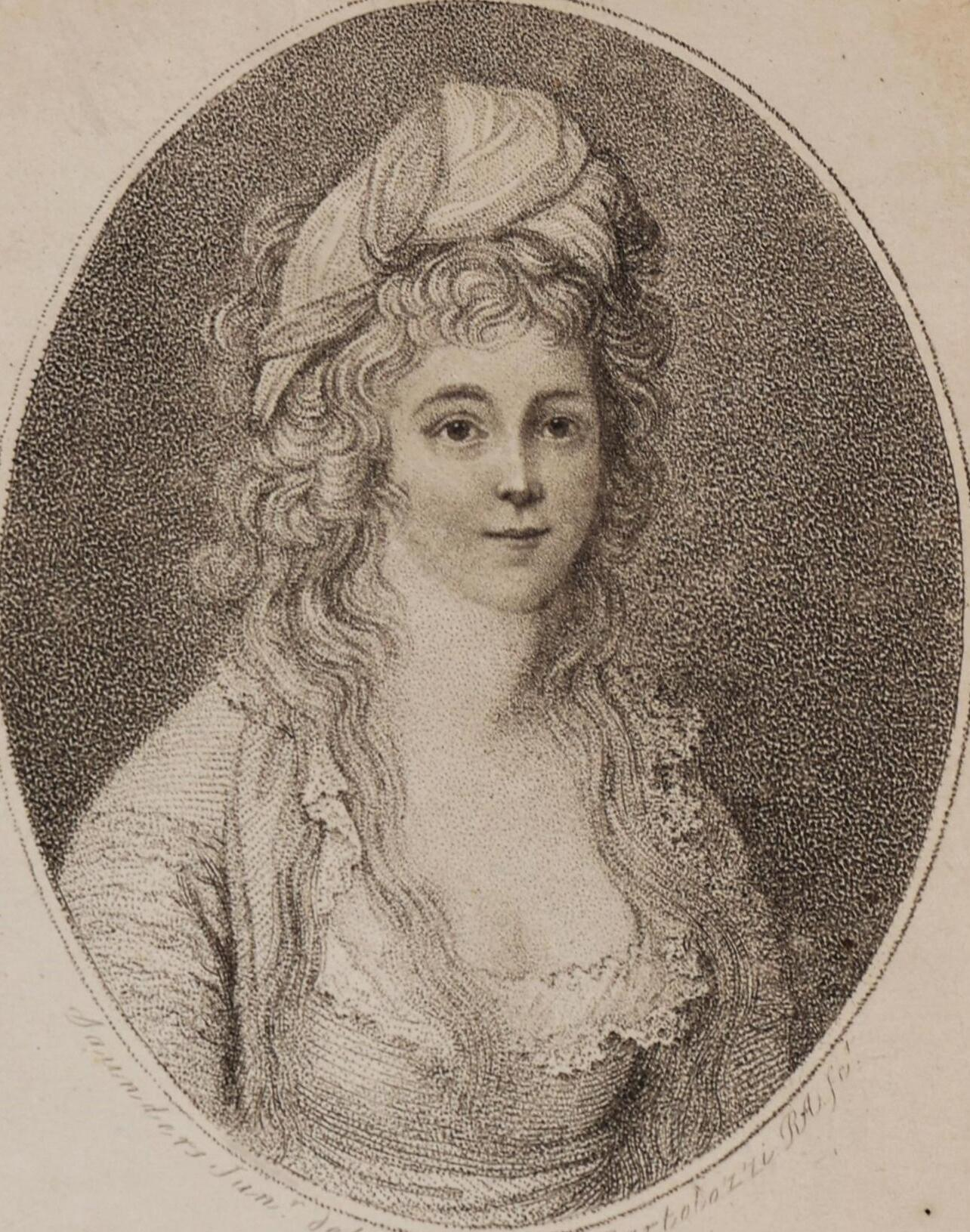
Elizabeth Gunning, 1796 engraving

Elizabeth Gunning published a loose translation of the novel in 1810, claiming it as an original work of her own. She published under her married name Mrs. Plunkett and gave it the title Dangers through Life; or, The Victim of Seduction.

=== Plot alterations ===
Count de Mirbelle becomes the English Lord Clermont, torn between Ismena de Alvira (a Spanish widow he rescued from Madeira) and the unhappily married Lady Cecilia Warwick. He is maliciously manipulated by the Marquis of Belvill, while his friend Sir Frederick Neville gives him virtuous advice. The plot of the novel closely follows that of Les Malheurs de l'inconstance, with some differences in Ismena's storyline. Clermont and Ismena are married by a priest at her mother's deathbed, rather than making purely personal vows. Ismena becomes pregnant; she gives birth the day after discovering Clermont's infidelity and immediately abandons the child to enter a convent, but returns in the final scene to forgive Clermont and urge him to live for his child. Rather than preparing a suicide note and a weapon in his final despair, Clermont brings his infant son to his father and begs him to care for the child; he then collapses in a fever and wakes to find the forgiving Ismena.

=== Reception ===
A review in The Critical Review was highly critical of Dangers through Life on moral grounds, describing it as "more likely to produce mischief than to promote good" due to its flattering descriptions of the guilty Clermont and Lady Warwick. (Note: They write: "The romantic girl who pants for the gay scenes and passionate lovers, of whom she reads such warm descriptions, will, we fear, pass over with the yawn of ennui, the wholesome advice of Mrs. Delmond [...] nor will she see the wickedness of the wife's conduct [...] with that horror which she ought to feel, when that wife is represented so amiable, so slighted by her husband and so loved by her paramour; who by the way is also described as vastly good; a husband and a father, who quits a most amiable and dutiful wife, to ruin a beautiful woman, and destroy the domestic peace of a family. Where, in the name of reason, can be the good moral of this story, when the guilty characters are so held up to admiration?") The reviewer also criticizes the repetitiveness of some of the letters, and is dissatisfied with the prose: "this production seems hastily written, and we look in vain for elegance of language or beauty of sentiment; instead of which we are favoured with a rhapsody, and with hot descriptions of still hotter love". The reviewer raises the possibility that the novel might be French in origin, but does not identify a specific work being imitated: "we are struck with almost a conviction that they are a translation, or at least a very strict imitation from the French. Does Mrs. Plunket suppose the Marquis of Belvill's first letter can add to the morals of the youth of either sex? Is it at all English? no! it is truly French;--French principles and French depravity mark the whole work."
