= Margaret Minifie =

British writer (1734–1803)

- Born: 15 July 1734; Staplegrove, Somerset
- Died: 11 May 1803 (aged 68)
- Resting place: Staplegrove, Somerset
- Occupation: Writer
- Relatives: Susannah Gunning, sister; Elizabeth Gunning, niece

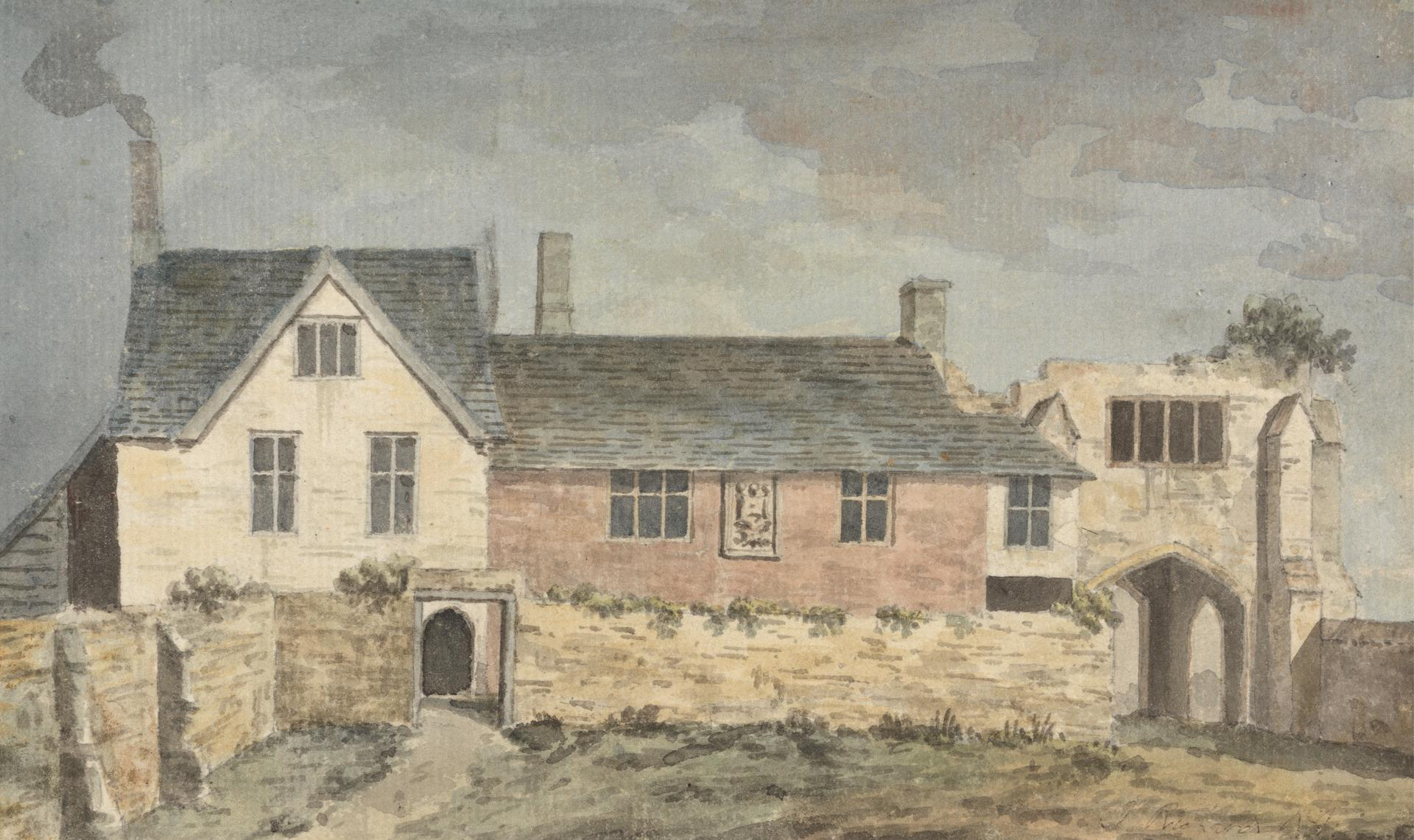
John Inigo Richards, "Inside of Castle Gate, Taunton, Somerset," 1752 (Yale Center for British Art)

Margaret Minifie (15 July 1734 – 11 May 1803) was a "a minor eighteenth-century sentimental novelist" whose career has tended to be overshadowed by that of her sister, Susannah Gunning. A number of Minifie's works have historically been attributed to Gunning, but recently critics have sought to disentangle their two histories.

== Life ==
Her father was James Minifie (1707–1789), a clergyman of Staplegrove, near Taunton, Somerset, and her mother was Margaret Minifie (1710–1782). Minifie did not marry and, as she was close to her sister, she lived with her and her family for most of her life. She died at age 68 and was buried in Staplegrove, the place of her birth.

== Work ==
Minifie's sister Susannah was also a writer and the pair collaborated on at least two novels: The histories of Lady Frances S— and Lady Caroline S— (1763), "a sentimental epistolary novel" which went into a second edition, and The Picture (1766). Susannah went on to write four more novels but seems to have taken a hiatus from writing once she married John Gunning (died 1797). Two novels published during this period frequently attributed to Susannah, The Count de Poland (1780) and Coombe Wood (1783), were "almost certainly" written by Minifie. Minifie had her own hiatus of 20 years, before the publication of her final novel, The Union (1801).

Minifie is one of Dale Spender's "100 good women writers before Jane Austen."

== Caricatures ==
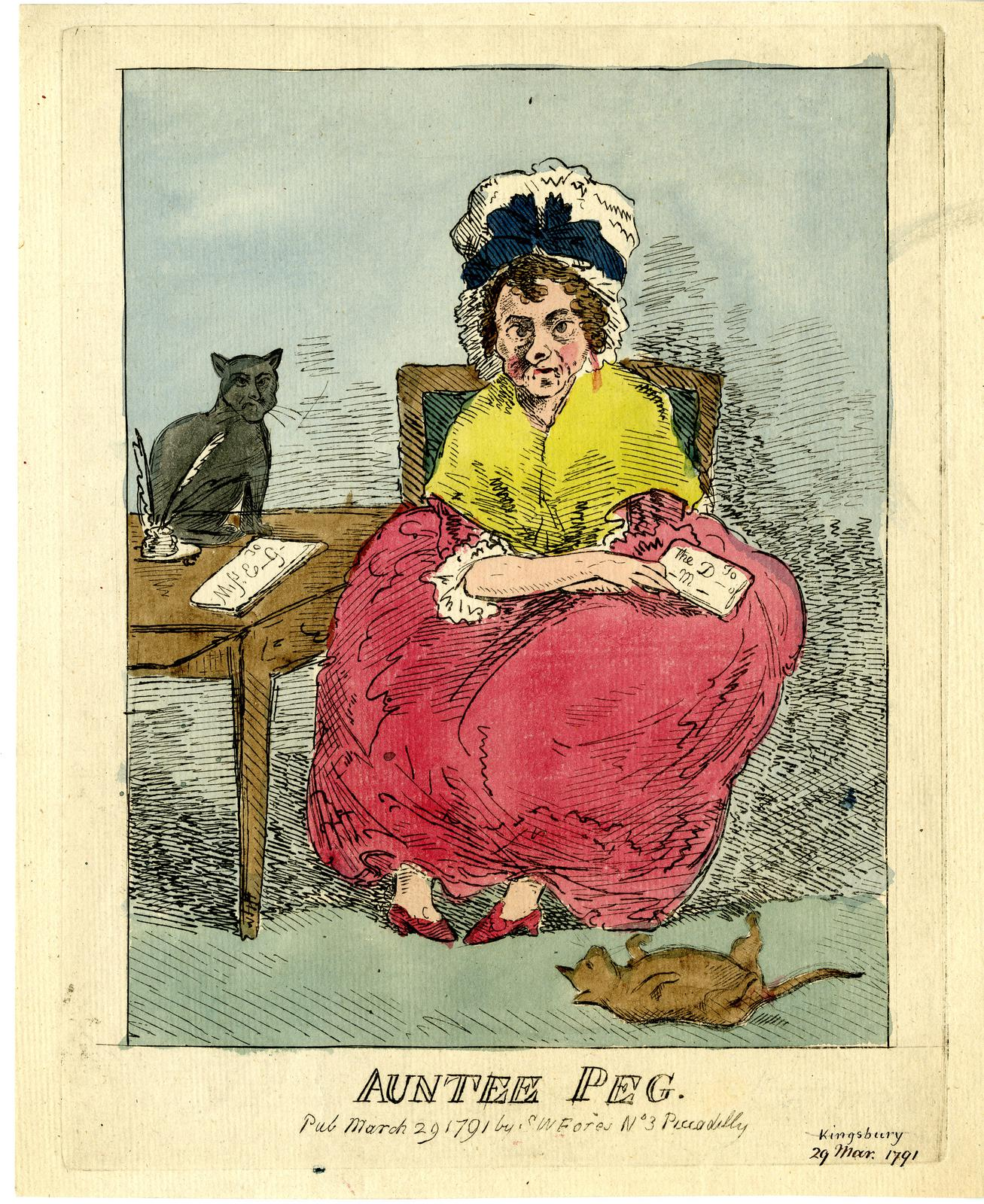
Isaac Cruikshank, "Auntee Peg," 29 March 1791 (British Museum)

While there seem to be no extant portraits of Minifie, there are a number of caricatures by James Gilray and Isaac Cruikshank, stemming from a 1791 scandal involving Minifie's niece, novelist Elizabeth Gunning (1769–1823) (see Susannah Gunning). Minifie's role in the imbroglio, dubbed the "Gunninghiad" by Horace Walpole, remains unknown. The caricatures, described by one commentator as "vicious," portray Minifie in an unflattering way as a stereotypical elderly spinster. Cruikshank's piece also takes aim at her profession with its depiction of her seated at a table surrounded by writing paraphernalia and cats, which was consistent with what some of their harsher critics thought of the sisters' literary productions.

Margaret Minifie had a long career as a popular novelist, and while she may not generally be considered a significant writer within the literary canon, her career has sparked interest among researchers interested in recovered women writers, popular fiction, sentimental novels, and the reading and publishing culture of the mid- to late eighteenth century.

== Bibliography ==
- With Susannah Gunning, The histories of Lady Frances S— and Lady Caroline S— (London: Robert and James Dodsley, 1763; 2nd ed. 1765)
- With Susannah Gunning, The Picture (London: Joseph Johnson and Co., 1766)
- Barford Abbey (London: Minerva Press, 1768)
- The Cottage (Durham & Co., 1769)
- The Hermit: a novel. By Miss Minifie, author of Barford-Abbey, The cottage, &c. (Dublin: James William, 1770)
- The Count de Poland (London & Bath: J. Dodsley, R. Baldwin, & Pratt and Clinch, 1780)
- Coombe Wood. A novel: in a series of letters. (London: Robert Baldwin I, 1783)
- The Union (London: Robert Dutton, 1801)

== Etexts ==
- Barford Abbey, Internet Archive
- Coombe Wood, Vol. I & Vol. II, Internet Archive

== See also ==
- List of early-modern British women novelists
