= The Jubilee (play) =

Play

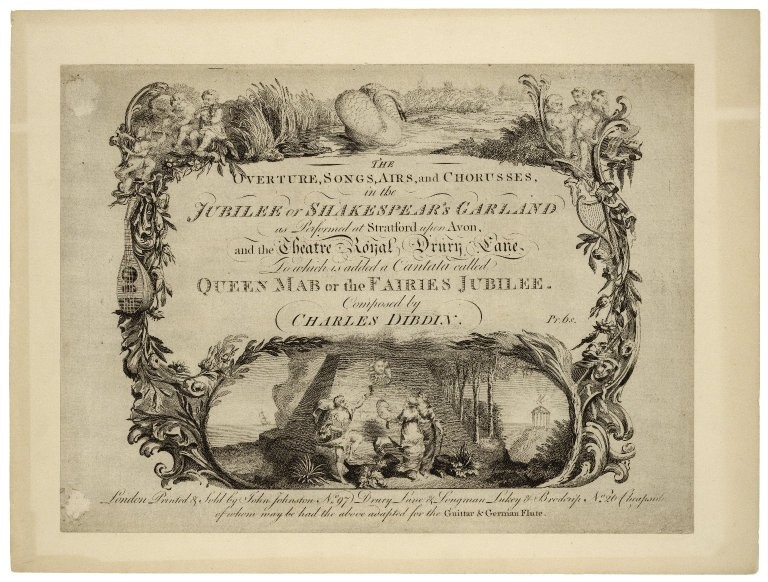
'Shakespear's Garland'.jpg

The Jubilee is a 1769 play by the British playwright and actor-manager David Garrick, with music by Charles Dibdin. It was based on his Shakespeare Pageant which he had originally planned to stage during the Shakespeare Jubilee in Stratford-upon-Avon until heavy rain forced it to be abandoned. It was first performed at the Drury Lane Theatre on 14 October 1769 and proved a major success, running for ninety performances. This allowed Garrick to recoup much of the money he had spent on the Jubilee celebrations.

A recording of The Jubilee, also including Queen Mab and Datchet Mead, was released in 2019 featuring the singer Simon Butteriss and the keyboardist Stephen Higgins.

== Bibliography ==
- Nicoll, Allardyce. A History of English Drama 1660–1900. Volume III: Late Eighteenth Century Drama. Cambridge University Press, 1952.
- Pierce, Patricia. The Great Shakespeare Fraud: The Strange, True Story of William-Henry Ireland. Sutton Publishing, 2005.
