= Eugénie (play) =

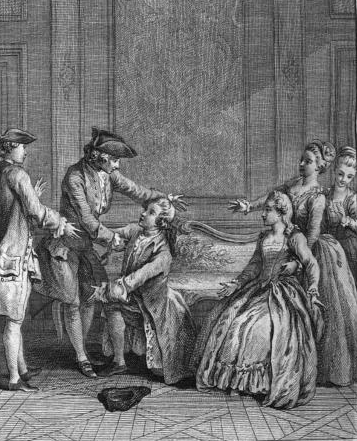
Scene from the final act of Eugénie.

Eugénie is a play in five acts by Pierre Augustin Caron de Beaumarchais. It was first performed at the Comédie-Française on January 29, 1767.

The premier of Eugénie was delayed for some time by the illness of one of its stars, Préville, who was to play the role of The Baron. There was much buzz about the play before the opening, and its premier was well-attended; but the audience's reception was lukewarm, evidently due to the play's long running-time. Beaumarchais and the cast spent the next two days revising the script, and the result was a greater success. Until the premiere of The Barber of Seville several years later, Eugénie was Beaumarchais's most famous play. It was adapted in English by Elizabeth Griffith as The School for Rakes in 1769—a direct translation was difficult to make as Beaumarchais, despite setting the story in England, demonstrated a poor understanding of British culture and law.

== Plot ==
The plot was inspired by an actual incident which befell Beaumarchais's sister.

=== Act One. ===
Eugénie and her aunt, Madame Murer, have come to London from their native Wales. They are accompanied by Eugénie's father Baron Hartley, who believes they're in town on business. In fact, Eugénie has secretly married The Earl of Clarendon and has come to visit him; they are staying in the Earl's petite maison, near his palace. Eugénie is dismayed that the Earl has gone out of town despite knowing about their plans to visit. Madame Murer—who is the only member of Eugénie's family that knows about the wedding—tries to reassure Eugénie that noblemen like the Earl simply have busy schedules. (It's of note that the script frequently indicates that Eugénie's father, the Baron, is not a nobleman.) Eugénie is even more concerned because she is already pregnant, and still hasn't told her father about her marriage, due to the insistence of Madame Murer and the Earl that it should be kept a secret. The Baron has even started to prepare an arranged marriage for her to someone else—an old military man by the name of Cowerly.

Eventually the Earl arrives to visit Eugénie. His valet, Drink, prepares to announce him, but chides his master: Drink knows that the Earl's marriage to Eugénie was not valid and in fact was completely staged. Furthermore, the Earl is preparing to marry someone else very soon. The Earl complains that another of his servants, his Steward who had pretended to be the minister at his fraudulent wedding, is also feeling regrets and will probably attempt to write to Madame Murer with the truth. He tells Drink to make sure to check any mail that's received at the house and withhold anything that looks like it might be from the Steward. Drink finally leaves to announce the Earl, during which time the Earl admits in monologue that he does truly love Eugénie but has been pressured by his uncle to marry someone else; he is so terrified of his uncle and so ashamed of his own behavior that he can't bring himself to confess what he's done.

When Eugénie and Madame Murer finally greet the Earl, Eugénie inquires as to why he has been so distant; the Earl responds with various lies which appease Eugénie. The Baron comes in and after meeting the Earl, congratulates him about his upcoming wedding to Lady Winchester, daughter of the Duke of Winchester. Eugénie and Madame Murer are horrified at this news, and the flustered Earl quickly lies and assures everyone that the stories of him getting married are just a rumor that's going around. The ladies retire and the two men exit together.

=== Act Two. ===
Later, the Earl sneaks back into the house alone in order to talk with Drink: he instructs Drink to make sure that nobody comes to visit Eugénie or her family until after his wedding is concluded, and he specifically warns about the Baron's friend Captain Cowerly (the brother of Eugénie's fiancé Cowerly.) Meanwhile, Drink has intercepted the letter from the Steward and hidden it. Once the ladies are alone, Drink gives them the remainder of the mail, which includes the news that Eugénie's brother Sir Charles, an officer in the army, has been in a duel with his Colonel; the Colonel lost after being disarmed, but is now trying to have Charles assassinated. Eugénie worries over her brother and gives the news to her father. Soon afterward Captain Cowerly comes into the house, complaining that the servants were insisting that nobody was home and that he had to barge his way in. After being greeted, Cowerly inquires as to where Sir Charles is at. The Baron and Madame Murer are amazed that he already knows about Sir Charles's troubles, and Cowerly explains that not only has he already spoken with Charles in London, but in fact had assumed that the reason for the family's visit was because Charles was there. Gradually the conversation turns to Earl Clarendon, and Cowerly reveals the family is staying in the Earl's petite maison (a house where parties and sexual trysts are had) and confirms that the Earl is about to marry someone else. Eugénie becomes physically unwell at the news and is taken away by her aunt.

=== Act Three. ===
Later, the Baron goes to comfort Eugénie. Eugénie decides she should not conceal the truth from her father anymore and admits to him that she has secretly married the Earl. The Baron is outraged by this news; just when he's beginning to calm down, Madame Murer enters and scolds him for his behavior and argues for the merits of the Earl. The Baron, meanwhile, argues that the Earl is a heartless womanizer. When Eugénie finally reveals she is already pregnant, the Baron is forced to give his blessing to the marriage; but both he and Eugénie remain confused as to why everyone seems to think the Earl is going to marry someone else if he is already married to Eugénie. They decide to ask Drink about what's going on. When Drink is called in, the Baron grabs him by the throat and demands answers; Drink is so frightened and confused that he mistakenly thinks they've learned that the marriage between the Earl and Eugénie was fraudulent, and winds up delivering to them the letter from the Steward since he believes they already know the contents. Eugénie and Madame Murer are horrified when they learn the truth, and the Baron is beside himself with outrage; he claims he will disown Eugénie, and storms off. Eugénie tearfully asks her aunt that they depart from London, but Madame Murer insists she should meet the Earl one more time—her plan is to call out a minister and to arm the servants, and have essentially a shotgun wedding for Eugénie and the Earl.

=== Act Four. ===
When the Earl arrives at Madame Murer's request, he brings along a companion he had rescued from an attack in the street—this man, it turns out, is Eugénie's brother Sir Charles. When Madame Murer and the servants try to ambush the Earl, Sir Charles—feeling indebted for the Earl's help to him—comes to his defense and allows the Earl to escape; however, Sir Charles indicates that he expects to duel with the Earl later on to settle the matter of Eugénie's marriage honorably. Eugénie is rendered catatonic by the whole incident and is finally taken away to bed, while Sir Charles swears he will avenge her.

=== Act Five. ===
The final act occurs very early in the morning; the family has been up all night fretting over Eugénie's condition, and they even seem to fear that she may die from grief. She is able to emerge from her room, in a weakened state, to try to convince Sir Charles not to fight the Earl—she insists that she'd rather be known as a "foresworn wretch" than to see the Earl harmed. Charles does not listen to her and leaves to fight the Earl: he returns almost immediately, lamenting that when he tried to fight the Earl, his sword shattered and the Earl escaped. Everyone assumes the Earl ran off to go through with this wedding to Lady Winchester. Later, to their surprise, the Earl forces his way into the house and throws himself at Eugénie's feet: he declares that he loves her and has done everything in his power to set things right, including admitting to his uncle all that he's done, and calling off the other wedding. Initially Eugénie seems to be so near death that she hasn't even heard him, but at last she gathers "what bits of energy remain" to reply with a rejection of his offer for marriage: she has been too badly mistreated to ever forgive him. The Earl pleads, and tries to get the Baron or Madame Murer to back him up, but they side with Eugénie. At last the Earl delivers a rousing speech in which he argues that, if Eugénie won't marry him for her own sake, then at least she should wed him for the sake of their child. This argument moves the Baron and he agrees to grant Eugénie to the Earl; at which news Eugénie's attitude (and health) do a complete turnaround, and she gladly accepts the Earl's hand.
