= Shakespeare Jubilee =

1769 jubilee celebrating William Shakespeare in Stratford-upon-Avon

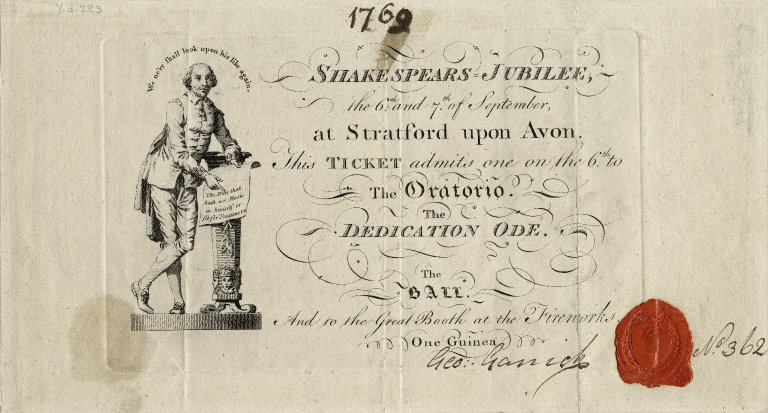
Ticket for the Shakespeare Jubilee in the Folger Shakespeare Library, Washington, D.C.

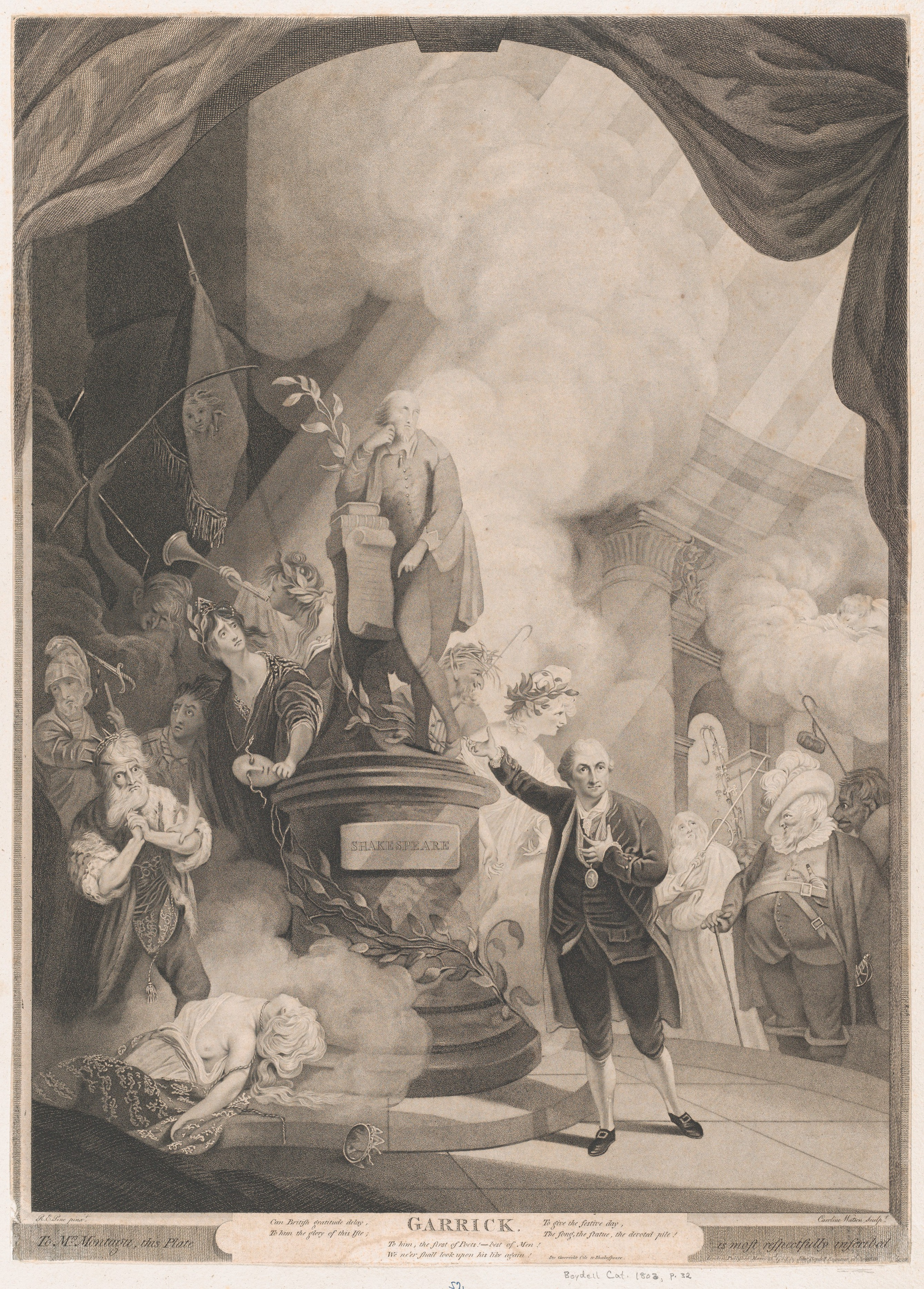
Garrick Speaking the Jubilee, engraving by Caroline Watson after Robert Edge Pine (1784, Metropolitan Museum of Art).

The Shakespeare Jubilee was staged in Stratford-upon-Avon between 6 and 8 September 1769. The jubilee was organised by the actor and theatre manager David Garrick to celebrate the Jubilee of the birth of William Shakespeare. It had a major impact on the rising tide of bardolatry that led to Shakespeare's becoming established as the English national poet. Thomas Arne composed the song "Soft Flowing Avon" for the Jubilee.

Stratford was at the time a town with around 2,200 inhabitants. Garrick, Britain's most famous Shakespearean actor and most influential theatre owner-manager, had the idea for the Jubilee when he was approached by the town's leaders who wanted him to fund a statue of Shakespeare to stand in the Town Hall. Garrick planned a major celebration with major figures from London's cultural, political and economic world attending. He oversaw the construction of a large rotunda, based on that in Ranelagh Gardens in London, which could hold 1,000 spectators. "It is difficult to exaggerate how much space in the papers in the weeks and months beforehand was devoted to discussion of the Jubilee, announcing details of the program, advertising various accoutrements, reporting progress, speculating about its form, and attacking it."

The Jubilee opened on 6 September with the firing of thirty cannons and the ringing of church bells. Various events were held to commemorate Shakespeare's life. It drew in many people from fashionable society, or who were involved in the London theatre. There were seven hundred people at the dinner on the first day. On the second day bad weather began to disrupt the proceedings and flooded parts of the Rotunda when the banks of the River Avon broke. The highlights of the second day were the unveiling of the new statue at the Town Hall and a masquerade held in the evening. Another notable event from the second day of the Jubilee was a speech by Garrick thanking the Shakespeare Ladies Club for making Shakespeare popular again and for their contribution to the memorial statue of Shakespeare in Poets' Corner in Westminster Abbey. The third day was to have seen a grand Shakespeare Pageant but the heavy rain forced this to be cancelled. Garrick later staged the Pageant in the Drury Lane Theatre with the music of Charles Dibdin where it was a success, running for ninety performances.

It was the first jubilee celebration of the life of Shakespeare, although it was held more than five years after the bicentenary of his birth in April 1564. In spite of the impact it had on the rising popularity of Shakespeare and his works, none of his plays were performed during the Jubilee.

A recording of Dibdin's The Jubilee, also including Queen Mab (which was performed on the first day of Garrick's festival) and Datchet Mead, was released in 2019 featuring the singer Simon Butteriss and the keyboardist Stephen Higgins.

== Bibliography ==
- Cunningham, Vanessa (2008), Shakespeare and Garrick, Cambridge: Cambridge University Press
- Deelman, Christian (1964), The Great Shakespeare Jubilee, London: Joseph
- Dobson, Michael (1992), The Making of the National Poet: Shakespeare, Adaptation and Authorship, 1660–1769, Oxford: Clarendon Press, ISBN 0198183232
- Pierce, Patricia (2005), The Great Shakespeare Fraud: The Strange, True Story of William-Henry Ireland, Sutton Publishing
- Stochholm, Johanne (1964), Garrick's Folly: The Shakespeare Jubilee of 1769 at Stratford and Drury Lane, New York: Barnes & Noble Inc.
- Tankard, Paul, ed. (2014), "The Stratford Jubilee", Facts and Inventions: Selections from the Journalism of James Boswell., New Haven: Yale University Press, pp. 17–34, ISBN 978-0-300-14126-9
