= Claude Joseph Dorat =

French writer

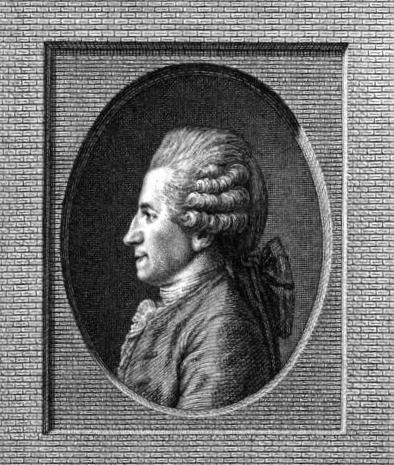
- Born: 31 December 1734
- Died: 29 April 1780 (aged 45)

Claude Joseph Dorat (French pronunciation: [klod ʒozɛf dɔʁa]; 31 December 1734 – 29 April 1780) was a French writer, also known as Le Chevalier Dorat.

He was born in Paris, to a family consisting of generations of lawyers, and he joined the corps of the king's musketeers. He became fashionable for his work, Réponse d'Abélard à Héloise ("Abelard's Answer to Heloise"), and followed up this first success with a number of heroic epistles, Les Victimes de l'amour, ou lettres de quelques amants célébres (1776) ("Victims of Love, or Letters from some famous lovers").

Besides light verse he wrote comedies, fables and, among other novels, Les Sacrifices de lamour, ou lettres de la vicomtesse de Senanges et du chevalier de Versenay (1771). He tried to cover his failures as a dramatist by buying up large numbers of seats for performances, and his books were lavishly illustrated by good artists and expensively produced, in order to secure their success. Nevertheless, he managed to attract hatred both of the philosophe party as well as of their arch-enemy, Charles Palissot de Montenoy, and thus cut himself off from the possibility of academic honours. Le Tartufe littéraire (1774) attacked La Harpe and Palissot, and at the same time D'Alembert and Mlle de Lespinasse.

Engravings by Marillier for Les Prôneurs ou le Tartuffe Littéraire, édition originale chez Delalain of 1777
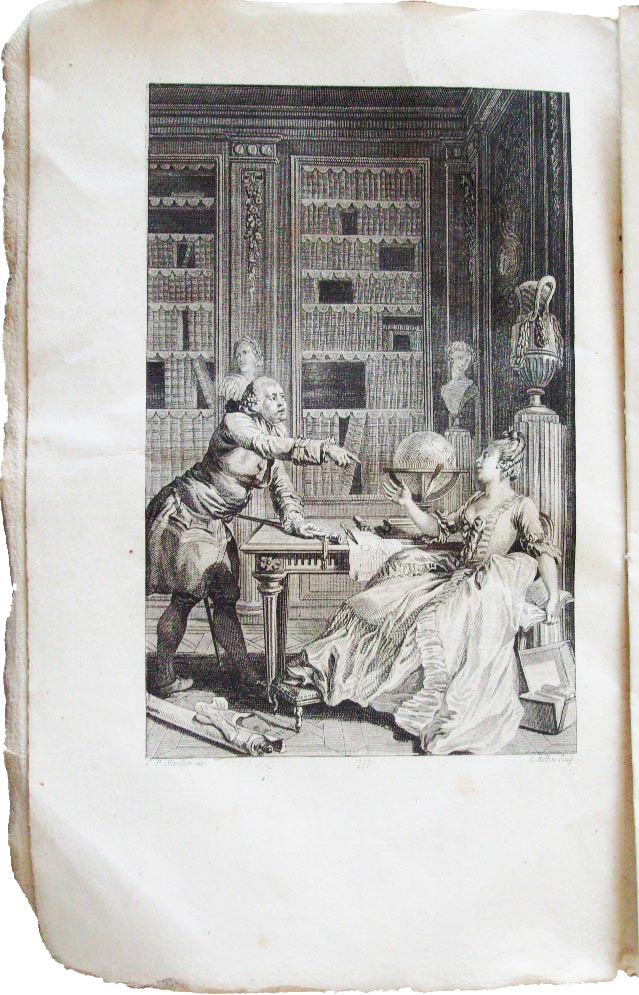
Frontispice

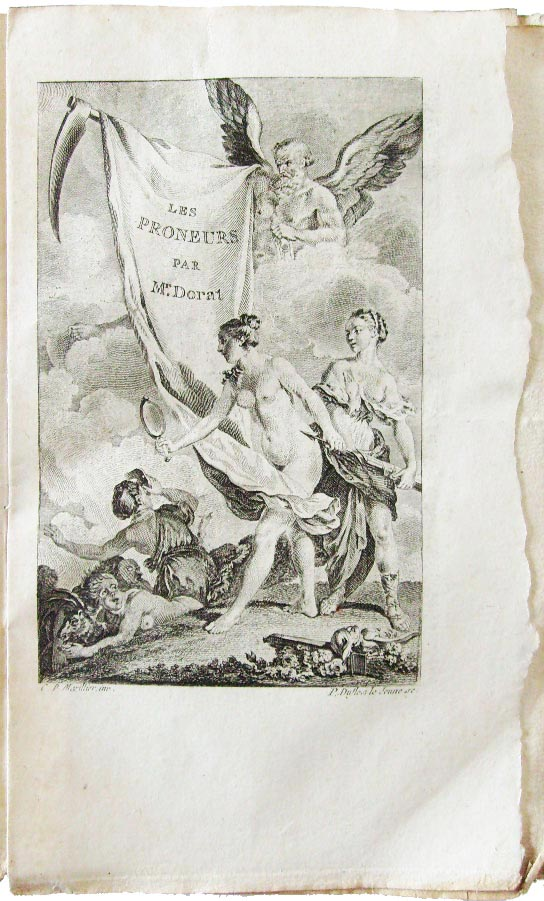
Faux-titre

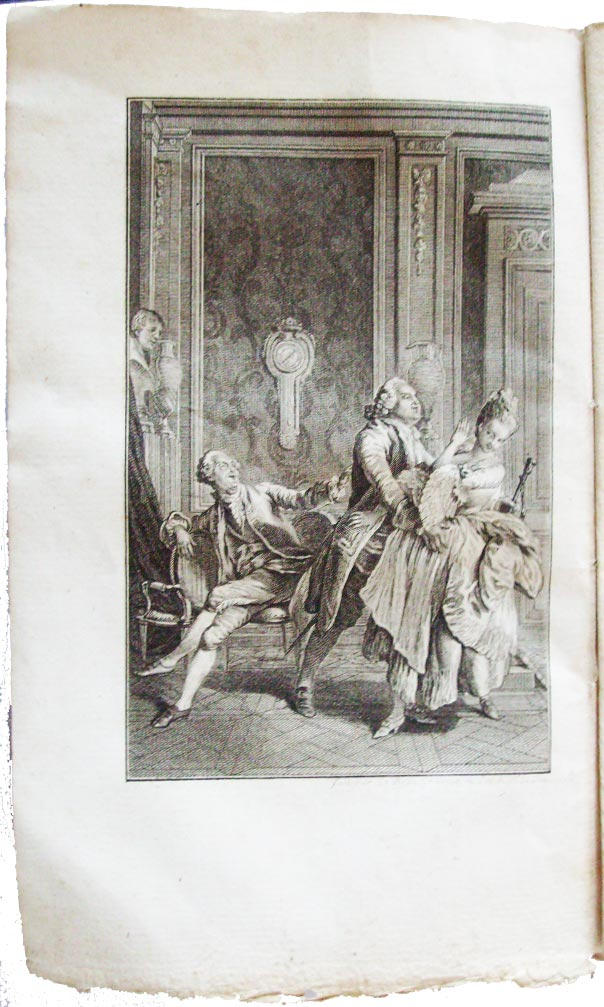
Engraving

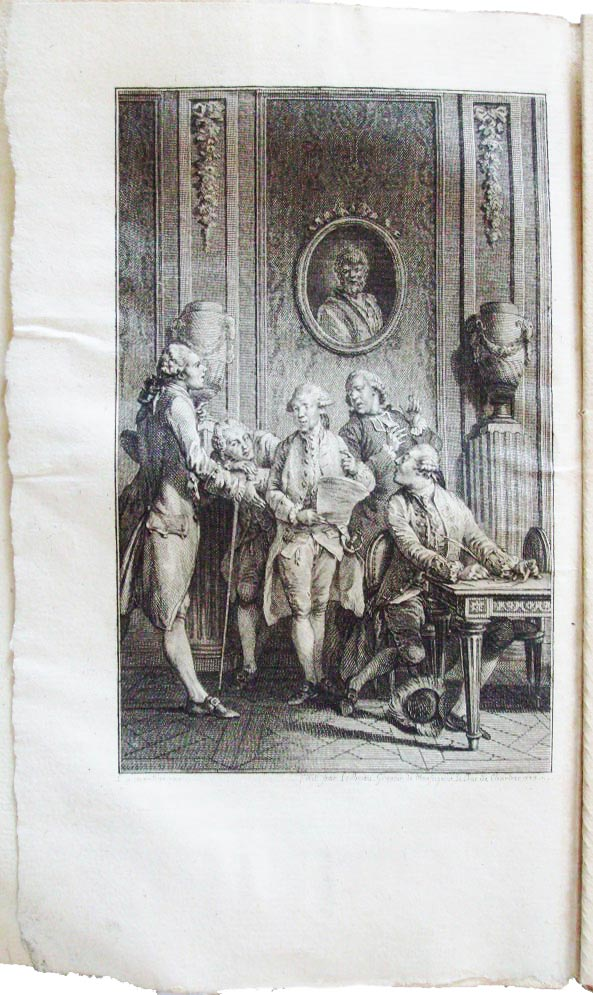
Engraving

== Works ==
- Les Malheurs de l'inconstance, 1772.
- Le Célibataire, comédie en cinq actes et en vers. Avignon: Frères Bonnet, 1776.
