= The School for Rakes =

1769 play

- Original language: English
- Written by: Elizabeth Griffith
- Genre: Comedy

Premiere
- Date: 4 February 1769
- Place: Theatre Royal, Drury Lane, London

The School for Rakes is a 1769 comedy play by the British writer Elizabeth Griffith. It was inspired by the 1767 French play Eugénie by Pierre Beaumarchais.

The original Drury Lane cast included Samuel Reddish as Frampton, Samuel Cautherley as Lord Eustace, Charles Holland as Sir William Evans, James William Dodd as Willis, Thomas King as Captain Lloyd, John Palmer as Colonel Evans, Robert Baddeley as Robert, Kitty Clive as Mrs Winifred and Sophia Baddeley as Harriet.

== Bibliography ==
- Baines, Paul & Ferarro, Julian & Rogers, Pat. The Wiley-Blackwell Encyclopedia of Eighteenth-Century Writers and Writing, 1660-1789. Wiley-Blackwell, 2011.
- Watson, George. The New Cambridge Bibliography of English Literature: Volume 2, 1660-1800. Cambridge University Press, 1971.
