= Susannah Gunning =

British writer and novelist (died 1800)

- Margaret's ghost' (Elizabeth Gunning; Susannah Gunning (née Minifie); Peg Minifie) by James Gillray, published by Hannah Humphrey hand-coloured etching, published 25 March 1791
- Born: Susannah Minifie
- Died: 28 August 1800; London, England
- Known for: Writer, Novelist
- Spouse: John Gunning (married 1768-1791)
- Children: Elizabeth Gunning
- Relatives: Margaret Minifie (sister)

Susannah Gunning, née Minifie (c. 1740 – 28 August 1800) was a British writer and novelist. She and her family were the centre of a society scandal in 1791 which revolved around a suitor for her daughter, Elizabeth Gunning.

== Biography ==
Susannah Gunning was one of at least two daughters of Reverend Dr. James Minifie. Her sister was Margaret Minifie. Not much is known about her life prior to the publication of her first novel in 1763. By this point, she lived in Fairwater, Somerset. On 8 August 1768, she married Captain John Gunning of the 65th Regiment of Foot, who distinguished himself at the Battle of Bunker Hill. He was described as leading a "dissolute" and morally-corrupt life. He was brother-in-law to the Duke of Argyll, and it is possible that the Duke aided his advancement in the military. Susannah and John Gunning had a daughter, novelist Elizabeth Gunning, born in 1769.

Susannah attempted to advance her daughter through marriage, but this failed and resulted in a public family row in 1791 which Horace Walpole described as the "Gunninghiad". Susannah and John Gunning each supported a different suitor for Elizabeth, and when Elizabeth chose her mother's preferred candidate they were both forced out of the family home. They were received by the Duchess of Bedford. Susannah Gunning responded to the feud, which included intrigue regarding a forged letter, with a letter to Duke of Argyll declaring her innocence. When no support came from any of their powerful relatives, Elizabeth and Susannah were forced to retreat to France and let the gossip die down. The Morning Post at the time recounted these events as the "public conversation of the town". The "Gunninghiad" prompted many satires from onlookers, one of which can be found in Nichols's Illustrations.

After the family separation, John Gunning – who at this point was a General – was fined £5,000 for "criminal conversation" with the wife of his tailor. He subsequently moved to Naples with his mistress to avoid paying the damages to her husband. Despite his boasting about conquests of aristocratic women, he altered his will the day before his death in 1797, leaving £8,000 and his Ireland estate to Susannah Gunning and their daughter.

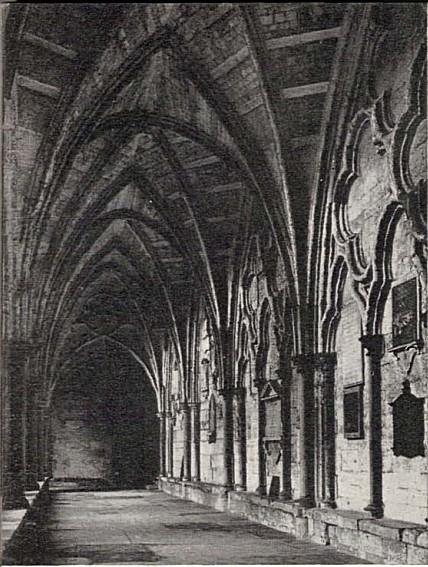
Westminster Abbey north cloister, the burial place of Susannah Gunning.

Susannah Gunning died in Down Street, London on 28 August 1800. She was buried in the north cloister at Westminster Abbey. She does not appear to have ever had an inscribed gravestone and it is not clear why she was buried there. An anonymous friend who wrote the foreword of her last novel, The Heir Apparent (1802), wrote that Gunning's "name [is] ever attended by the recollection of her virtues'", and "[h]er life, from her cradle to her grave, was a life of holiness". An obituary in The Gentleman's Magazine was more frank, claiming Gunning was "a lady well known, if not highly celebrated, in the republik of letters" whose works were "among the middling class of novels".

== Literary career ==
Throughout her career, Susannah Gunning wrote 13 novels, a long poem, and a defence of her daughter. She and her sister, Margaret Minifie, began their literary careers when they published by subscription their work Histories of Lady Frances S--- and Lady Caroline S--- in 1763. From 1764 to 1770, commercial publishers released Gunning's subsequent novels: Family Pictures (1764), The Picture (1766), Barford Abbey (1768), The Cottage (1769), The Hermit (1770). The tone and plot of these novels were consistent with popular themes of the time – largely young women marrying into aristocracy. Gunning ceased writing in 1768 with her marriage to John Gunning.

It is unlikely that Gunning wrote any fiction during her marriage: the one novel published during this time, The Count de Poland (1780), was most likely written by her sister Margaret Minifie. During the "Gunninghiad", Gunning wrote a letter to the Duke of Argyll which paints her daughter as a victim and describes her in a melodramatic tone akin to that of her novels. Despite this, it does not appear that many readers believed her side of the story.

Gunning published her next solo novel in 1783 after 15 years of marriage. At this time, Gunning's use of satire and autobiographical details increased throughout her writing. For example, in Coombe Wood (1783) the heroine does not marry her cousin despite loving him, which mirrors events which occurred during the "Gunninghiad". Gunning's poem Virginius and Virginia (1792) similarly contains autobiographical details with the theme that a father and child should not "be debar'd". Gunning's family affairs also inspired the contents of her novels Anecdotes of the Delborough Family (1792) and Memoirs of Mary (1793).

In 1796, Gunning's novel did not portray her own life like previous works. Delves (1796) is a quixotic adventure of a young boy. Gunning's final novels, Love at First Sight (1797) and Fashionable Involvements (1800) are novels of manners which rely on plot and stylised characters.

Gunning's novels achieved mild popularity and some ridicule for their tendency to be over-the-top with sentimental plots. Gunning's tendency to hyperbole prompted a contemporary writer to coin the term 'minific'. She often used Gothic language in narratives about family, hinting towards her own experience as a wronged mother who needed money to care for her children.

== Works ==
- Barford Abbey (a Novel), 1767; Garland Pub., 1975, ISBN 978-0-8240-1182-6; Lightning Source Inc, 2006, ISBN 978-1-4280-1672-9
- The Cottage: A Novel, H. Saunders, J. Potts, W. Sleater, 1775
- Susannah Gunning, M. Minifie (Miss.) The Count of Poland, J. and R. Byrn for Messieurs Price, Whitestone, 1780
- Gunning, Susannah (1783). Coombe wood.
- Anecdotes of the Delborough Family: A Novel, 2nd ed; London: Lane, 1792
- Memoirs of Mary, a Novel. London: Printed for J[ohn] Bell, No. 148, Oxford-Street. 1793. OCLC 1399367149. Volume I, volume II, volume III, volume IV, and volume V.
- Fashionable Involvements: A Novel, 3rd ed; London: Longman and Rees, 1800
- The Heir Apparent: a Novel , London: Ridgeway & Symonds, 1794; Elizabeth Plunkett, ed. (1802). The heir apparent.
- Love at First Sight: A Novel, London: Lowndes, 1797
