= Thomas Sheridan (divine) =

Anglican divine, essayist, playwright, poet, schoolmaster and translator

Thomas Sheridan (1687 – 10 October 1738) was an Anglican divine, essayist, playwright, poet, schoolmaster and translator. He is chiefly remembered for his friendship with Jonathan Swift.

== Family and early career ==
He was born in Cavan, Ireland, the son of James Sheridan, and grandson of The Reverend Dennis Sheridan. Two of his uncles were Church of Ireland prelates: The Rt Rev. William Sheridan, Bishop of Kilmore and Ardagh, and The Rt Rev. Patrick Sheridan, Bishop of Cloyne. After graduating from Trinity College, Dublin, he married Elizabeth MacFadden and the couple first lived in Dublin in King James's Mint. He inherited from his father-in-law a substantial property at Quilca, near Mullagh, in County Cavan. He ran a school in Capel Street, Dublin, in the 1720s, whose pupils included children of many prominent families such as Anthony Foster, the future Chief Baron of the Irish Exchequer, and Philip Tisdall, the future Attorney General for Ireland. The school shut in the early 1730s, having declined in reputation as Sheridan's health failed.

He was the father of Thomas Sheridan, a celebrated actor and elocutionist, who was in his turn the father of the celebrated playwright Richard Brinsley Sheridan; he had two other sons and one daughter.

His marriage was extremely unhappy, and, though in general a cheerful and easy-going man, he spoke of his wife with something close to hatred: "I have been tied to the Devil for 24 years".

In 1725 he was appointed a royal chaplain, but preached a sermon which was considered by some to be politically suspect, and his appointment was cancelled. In compensation he was given a living at Drumlane in County Cavan, and in 1735 became headmaster of the Royal School Cavan, where he remained for three years. Other appointments he is reputed to have applied for were the position of Dean of Kilmore and the position of headmaster of the Royal School in Armagh, but neither application was successful.

Linley-Sheridan family

- The red border denotes singers and musicians - - The turquoise border denotes writers, poets and playwrights - - The orange border denotes actors

James Sheridan	William Sheridan	Patrick Sheridan	Thomas Sheridan
Thomas Sheridan
Thomas Sheridan	Frances Chamberlaine	Thomas Linley
Alicia Sheridan	Betsy Sheridan	Richard Brinsley Sheridan	Elizabeth Ann Linley	Thomas Linley	Richard Tickell	Mary Linley	Samuel Linley	Maria Linley	Ozias Thurston Linley	Jane Linley	William Linley
Thomas Le Fanu	Alicia Le Fanu	Thomas Sheridan	Caroline Henrietta Callander
Sheridan Le Fanu	William Richard Le Fanu	Richard Brinsley Sheridan	4th Baron Dufferin and Claneboye	Helen Sheridan	Earl of Gifford	George Chapple Norton	Caroline Sheridan	9th Baronet Stirling-Maxwell	Georgiana Sheridan	12th Duke of Somerset
Marquesses of Dufferin (1888-1988)	Barons Grantley (1875-)	Dukes of Montrose, among others

== Friendship with Swift ==
He was friends with Jonathan Swift, and had a room permanently reserved for him in the Deanery; he was his principal collaborator and wrote his biography. Swift often stayed at Sheridan's country house in County Cavan and wrote part of Gulliver's Travels there On the much debated question of whether Swift was secretly married to Esther Johnson ("Stella"), Sheridan was a strong if not conclusive witness that the marriage did take place; according to his friends his source for the story was Stella herself.

Like so many of Swift's friends, he was ultimately fated to quarrel with him irrevocably: in 1738, following Sheridan's recovery from an illness, Swift told him that he was no longer welcome at the Deanery. Apart from Swift's increasing eccentricity, the cause of the quarrel is obscure: by one account Sheridan rebuked Swift for his growing avarice, a claim which Swift thought unforgivable.

== Death and reputation ==
Sheridan collapsed and died suddenly while having dinner at a friend's house in Rathfarnham, County Dublin.

Swift before their final quarrel called him the best scholar in Ireland; Sir Walter Scott in his Life of Swift calls him "good-natured and light-hearted". Why he came to dislike his wife so much is unknown; Swift and others suspected that he sought consolation with other women.
