= Linley =

Linley may refer to

== Places ==
- Linley, Barrow, Shropshire, England, the location of St Leonard's Church, Linley
- Linley, More, Shropshire, United Kingdom, near Bishop's Castle
- Linley Point, New South Wales, Australia
  - Linley House, a house located in the suburb
- Linley Sambourne House, United Kingdom

== Surname ==
- Cody Linley (born 1989), American actor and singer
- Elizabeth Ann Linley (1754–1792), British actress and singer
- Eversley Linley (born 1969), Saint Vincent and the Grenadines sprinter
- George Linley (1798–1865), British songwriter
- Harry Linley (fl. 1913–1921), British footballer
- Jessica Linley (born 1989), British beauty pageant winner
- Maria Linley (1763–1784), British singer
- Mary Linley (1758–1787), British singer
- Ozias Thurston Linley (1765–1831), British clergy
- Samuel Linley (1760–1778), British musician
- Ted Linley (footballer) (1894-unknown), British footballer
- Thomas Linley the elder (1733–1795), British composer
- Thomas Linley the younger (1756–1778), British composer
- Tim Linley (born 1982), British cricketer
- William Linley (1771–1835), British composer

== Given name ==
- Linley Frame (born 1971), Australian swimmer
- Linley Hamilton (born 1965), British musician, educator, broadcaster
- Linley E. Pearson (born 1946), American politician, lawyer, and judge
- Linley Wilson (1898–1990), Australian dancing entrepreneur

== Title ==
- David Armstrong-Jones, Viscount Linley (born 1961), British aristocrat & furniture maker
- Serena Armstrong-Jones, Viscountess Linley (born 1970), British aristocrat

== See also ==
- Lindley (disambiguation)
- Lynley
