= Thomas Linley the Elder =

English musician (1733–1795)

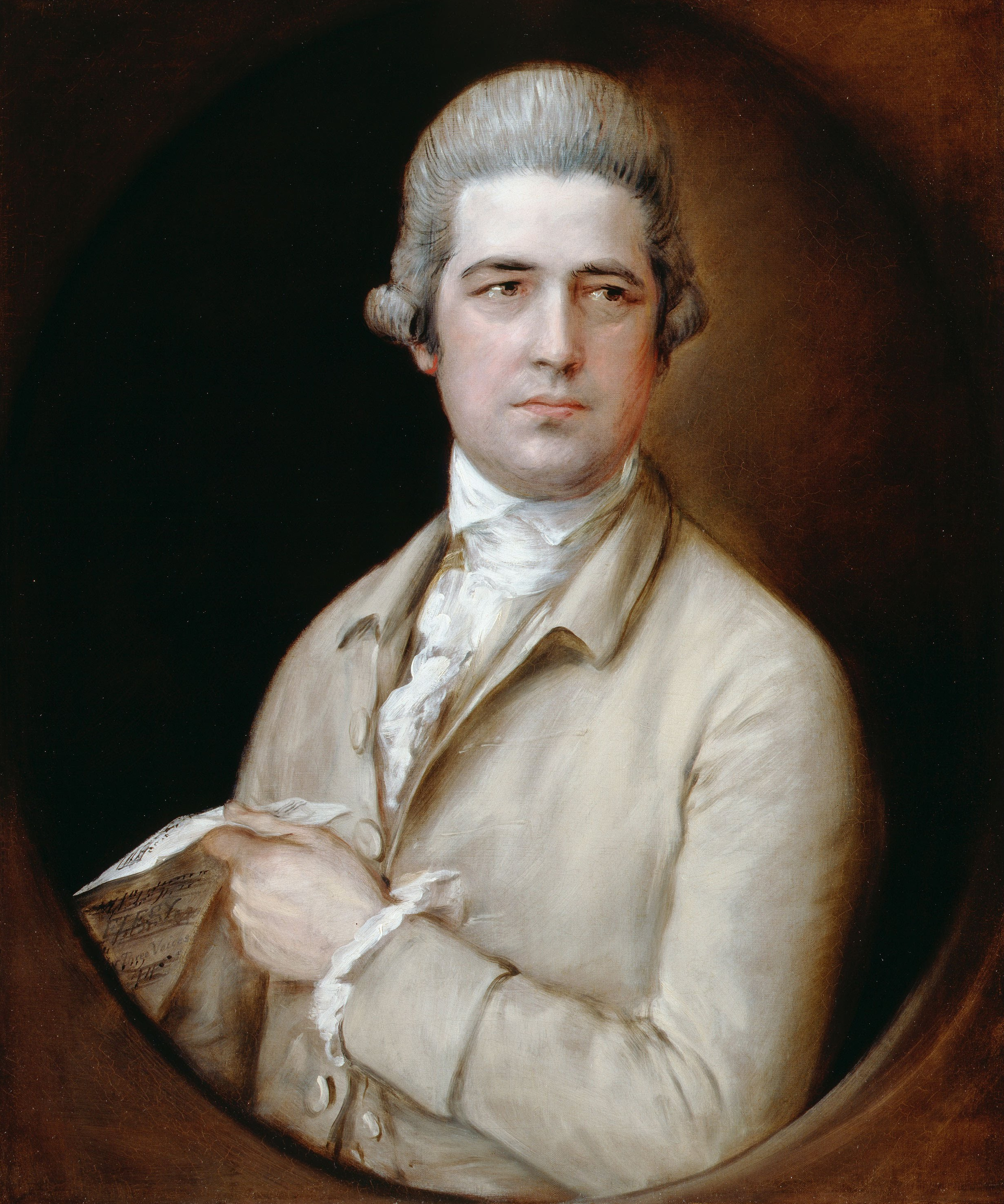
- Portrait of Thomas Linley the Elder by Thomas Gainsborough, c. 1770. Linley is holding his "Elegies for Three Voices".
- Born: 17 January 1733; Badminton, Gloucestershire, England
- Died: 19 November 1795 (aged 62); Westminster, Central London, England
- Occupations: Musician; bass; musical director; music teacher
- Years active: 1750s–1780s
- Notable work: The Duenna (1775)
- Spouse: Mary Johnson (m. 1752)
- Children: Elizabeth Ann; Thomas; Mary; Samuel; Maria; Ozias; William; Jane

Thomas Linley (17 January 1733 – 19 November 1795) was an English music teacher, singer, organist, harpsichordist, musical director, theatre owner and composer, active in Bath, Somerset and later in London.

Born in Badminton, Gloucestershire, Linley began his musical career after he moved to Bath at the age of 11 and became an apprentice to the organist Thomas Chilcot. After his marriage to Mary Johnson in 1752, Linley supported his wife and growing family predominantly as a music teacher. As his children grew and he developed their musical talent, he drew an increasing amount of income from their concerts while also managing the assembly rooms in Bath. When the new Bath Assembly Rooms opened in 1771, Linley became musical director and continued to promote his children's careers. He was eventually able to move to London with the thousands of pounds he had amassed from their concerts.

Among Linley's students were his eight children (Elizabeth Ann, Thomas, Mary, Samuel, Maria, Ozias, William, and Jane), as well as tenor Charles Dignum, singer and actress Anna Maria Crouch, and novelist Frances Sheridan.

In London, Linley became a musical director and part-owner of the Theatre Royal, Drury Lane. He collaborated with his son Thomas the Younger in penning the comic opera The Duenna, with a libretto by his son-in-law Richard Brinsley Sheridan.

== Early life ==
Linley's parents were William (1704–1792), a carpenter, (Note: William, Linley's father, is listed as a carpenter before the family moved to Bath but is later recorded as a prosperous builder) and Maria (1701–1792). He was the couple's eldest child and was born on 17 January 1733 in the village of Badminton in Gloucestershire. When Linley was 11 years old, in 1744, the family moved to Bath, Somerset, where he served an apprenticeship with Thomas Chilcot, the organist at Bath Abbey. Before becoming Chilcot's apprentice, Linley had initially assisted by pumping the organ. He may also have received tuition from Domenico Paradisi, who was giving harpsichord lessons in London from around 1747. William Boyce also tutored him in London.

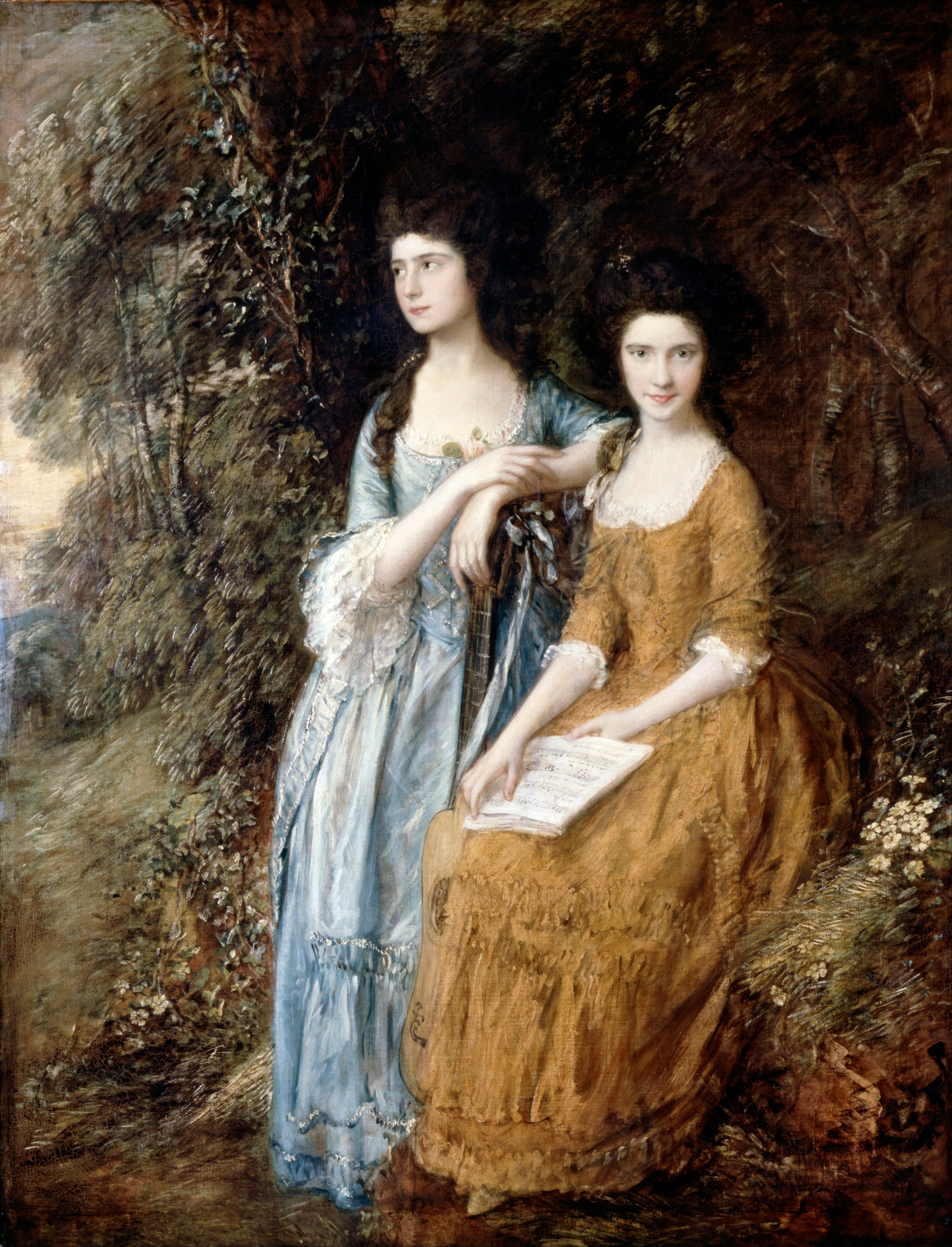
The Linley Sisters by Thomas Gainsborough, 1772, Dulwich Picture Gallery

He married Mary Johnson (1729–1820) on 11 May 1752 in Batheaston; Johnson was described by Ozias Humphry, who lodged with the couple for two years from 1762 until 1764, as having musical talents almost on a par with her husband. According to Michael Kelly, when young, Mrs. Linley was "reckoned beautiful". The couple had 12 children over an 18-year period from 1753 until 1771, but only eight lived beyond infancy or childhood. Seven went on to musical or theatrical careers: Elizabeth Ann Linley (1754–1792), his eldest daughter, wife of Richard Brinsley Sheridan; his eldest son Thomas Linley the Younger (1756–1778), composer and noted violinist; Mary Linley (1758–87), who gave up her career as a singer after she married playwright Richard Tickell in 1780; Samuel Linley (1760–1778), second son, singer and oboe player; Maria Linley (1763–84), singer; Ozias Thurston Linley (1765–1831), minor canon at Norwich and organist at Dulwich; and William Linley, (1771–1835), composer of glees, songs and writer. Another child, Jane Nash (1768–1806), sang in an amateur capacity until her marriage. Music historian Charles Burney visited when the children were young and listened to them singing and playing instruments; he described the family as "a Nest of Nightingales".

The family were well established in Bath and Linley worked as a music teacher; when Elizabeth was born in 1754 they were living in a house on Abbey Green. In the mid-1760s they rented a house with eleven rooms on Orchard Street to accommodate the ever-increasing number of children. Linley is likely to have received some financial assistance from his father whose business was flourishing but the family still encountered monetary difficulties. Linley's wife was frugal but "her parsimony grew legendary" when she was employed as a wardrobe mistress at the Theatre Royal, Drury Lane, after the family fortunes had prospered.

Linley-Sheridan family

The red border denotes singers and musicians. The turquoise border denotes writers, poets and playwrights. The orange border denotes actors.

James Sheridan	William Sheridan	Patrick Sheridan	Thomas Sheridan
Thomas Sheridan
Thomas Sheridan	Frances Chamberlaine	Thomas Linley
Alicia Sheridan	Betsy Sheridan	Richard Brinsley Sheridan	Elizabeth Ann Linley	Thomas Linley	Richard Tickell	Mary Linley	Samuel Linley	Maria Linley	Ozias Thurston Linley	Jane Linley	William Linley
Thomas Le Fanu	Alicia Le Fanu	Thomas Sheridan	Caroline Henrietta Callander
Sheridan Le Fanu	William Richard Le Fanu	Richard Brinsley Sheridan	4th Baron Dufferin and Claneboye	Helen Sheridan	Earl of Gifford	George Chapple Norton	Caroline Sheridan	9th Baronet Stirling-Maxwell	Georgiana Sheridan	12th Duke of Somerset
Marquesses of Dufferin (1888–1988)	Barons Grantley (1875-)	Dukes of Montrose, among others

== Career ==
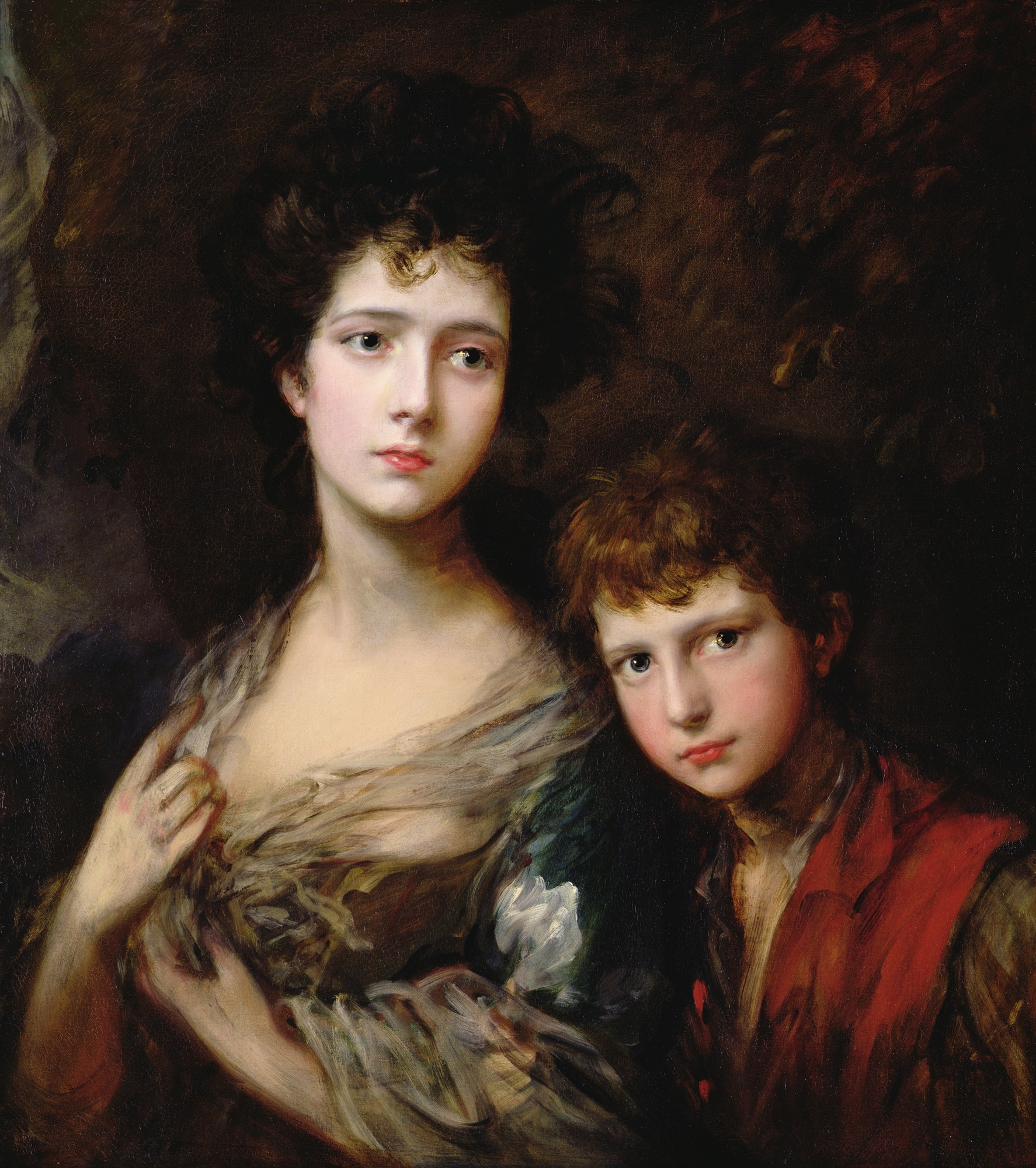
Thomas Gainsborough: Elizabeth and Thomas Linley

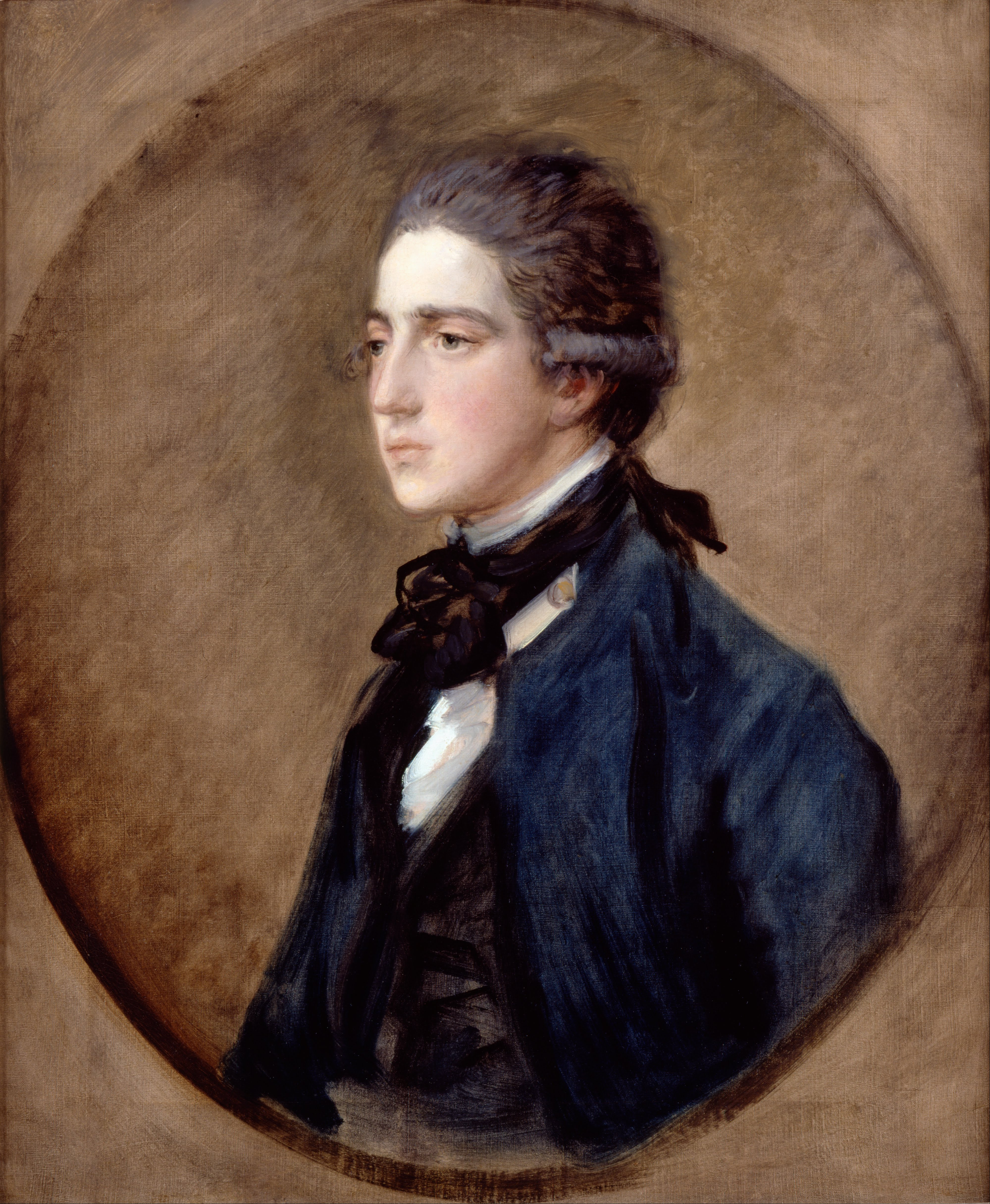
Thomas Gainsborough: Samuel Linley

The early years of marriage saw Linley as the sole income producer for the family; some of the older children, particularly Elizabeth and Mary, were sent to stay with relatives, or perhaps boarding school. Linley was a tenor, an organist and harpsichordist but at that time was generating his income mainly by teaching and his tuition skills were increasingly sought out; Frances Sheridan was one of his pupils in 1763, although she became better known as a playwright and novelist. Another of his pupils was Anna Maria Crouch who later stated she was apprehensive of him. Charles Dignum was also trained by Linley.

Pupils were contracted to give a proportion of their earnings back to their tutors. He coached his children, providing their musical education from an early age. The children were put to work at a young age, firstly selling concert tickets then performing; Elizabeth began singing in concerts by the time she was nine years old in 1763. Anything earned by the children was commandeered by Linley and the talented youngsters quickly became a major source of his income. Linley took over the management of the musical performances held at the Assembly rooms in Bath in 1766; he had participated as the harpsichordist from 1755 when the performances were managed by Chilcot. The two eldest children, Elizabeth and Thomas, were utilised to sell the tickets for these concerts from 1762.

The new Bath Assembly Rooms opened in 1771 with Linley as Musical Director. Linley's regular concerts starring his children were performed in front of full houses and his finances began to prosper. The family moved to Royal Crescent, a more fashionable address, raising their social standing. The children started to feature in concerts further afield including oratorios in London; Linley demanded high fees for them and organisers of a charity concert held to raise funds for the Foundling Hospital had to pay £100 (Note: equivalent to £13,212 in 2025.) for two of his daughters to sing. (Note: Linley's 2004 ODNB entry quotes £80 but the actual newspaper report states £100.) At the time of Elizabeth's marriage to Richard Brinsley Sheridan on 13 April 1773 estimates appeared in the Bath Chronicle speculating Linley had earned almost £10,000 (Note: equivalent to £1,321,194 in 2025.) from her performances.

An agreement was made with John Christopher Smith and John Stanley for the older children to perform at the Theatre Royal, Drury Lane, in 1773 that saw takings of over £500 (Note: equivalent to £66,060 in 2025.) per night for the oratorios performed during the Lenten season. The following year, in 1774, Linley joined Stanley in the management role of directing, writing and organising musical compositions at the theatre. Two years later, in June 1776, a partnership of his son-in-law, Richard Brinsley Sheridan, Doctor James Ford who was a court physician (Note: Dr Ford was George III's physician and Queen Charlotte's obstetrician.) and Linley purchased a half share of the theatre for a total of £35,000. (Note: equivalent to £4,959,263 in 2025.) Linley re-located his residence to Norfolk Street, London and mortgaged his properties in Bath to raise his £10,000 stake towards the purchase. The trio bought the remaining share after another two years paying David Garrick a similar amount giving them complete ownership. The Royal Society of Musicians elected him as a member in 1780.

According to musicologist, writer and singer, Mollie Sands, Linley was one of the "most famous of English-born [music] teachers". As a composer, Linley wrote and arranged some songs and ensembles for The Duenna in 1775; written at the request of Sheridan and in collaboration with Linley Jr, the opera was an exceptional success, being performed seventy-five times at Drury Lane – Lord Byron endorsed it as "the best opera ever written". An earlier composition, for Thomas Hull's The Royal Merchant, performed at Covent Garden in 1767, was noted as a failure as well as a success. An unnamed critic wrote in The London Stage that "The music may be good, but the piece is trifling and childish". In 1786 he collaborated with John Burgoyne on the successful Richard Coeur de lion.

== Death and legacy ==
Linley died suddenly on 19 November 1795 at his home, 11 Southampton Street in Westminster. He was survived by his wife, but most of his children had predeceased him at a young age.
