= William Linley =

English violinist (1771–1835)

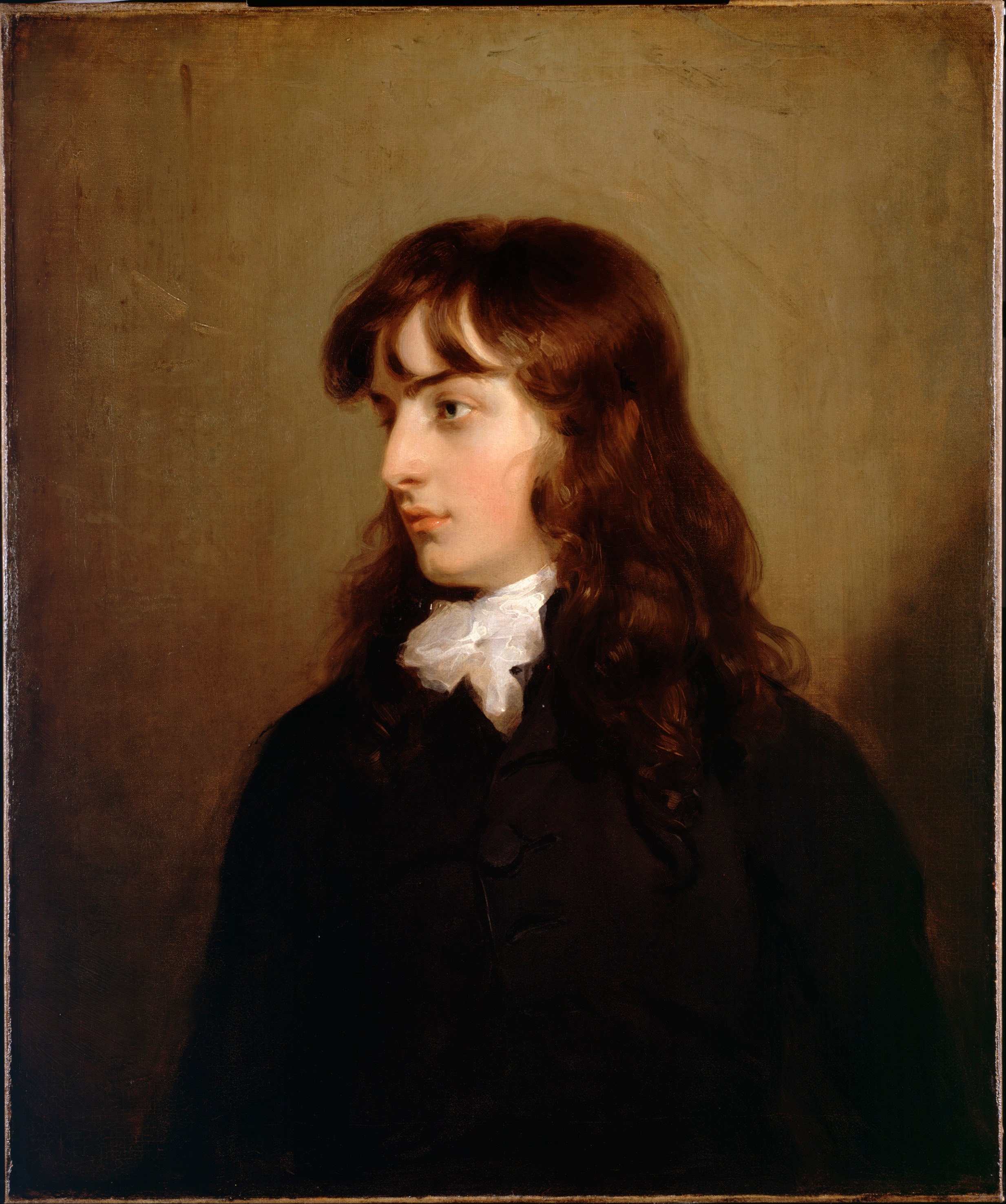
Portrait of William Linley, by Thomas Lawrence (Dulwich Picture Gallery), aged around 18.

William Linley (1771–1835) was one of seven musical siblings born to Thomas Linley the elder and his wife Mary Johnson.

== Early life ==
Born in Bath, Somerset, on 27 January 1771 Linley was the youngest child of the composer Thomas Linley and Mary Johnson (1729–1820). Educated at Harrow and then St Paul's School, additional tutoring in musical disciplines was provided by his father and Carl Friedrich Abel.

Linley was noted for his sweet singing voice, performing a song by Henry Purcell, which inspired Samuel Taylor Coleridge to write a sonnet beginning 'While my young cheek retains its healthful hue'. Though his father, declared him insufficiently talented for a professional stage career.

He joined the British East India Company and was in India from 1790 to 1795. Due to declining health he returned to England, arriving shortly before his father's death in November 1795. He returned to India, and stayed there from 1800 to 1805, holding a writership at their College in Madras. He retired from the company in 1810 and devoted himself to singing, composing glees and songs and writing literature. From 1809 until his death in 1835 he maintained memberships in both the Madrigal Society and The Noblemen and Gentlemen's Catch Club. In February 1810, he was elected to the Sublime Society of Beefsteaks, a membership club whose number was never more than twenty-four. Linley would have attended every Saturday night and eaten beefsteaks and drunk port wine at the first Lyceum Theatre.

He bequeathed his collection of family portraits to Dulwich Picture Gallery.

Linley outlived all his siblings and died on 6 May 1835 at the age of 64, following a brief illness at his chambers in Furnival's Inn. As the last surviving member of his immediate family, he was buried in the family vault at St Paul's, Covent Garden.

== The Linley portrait collection: seven musical siblings ==
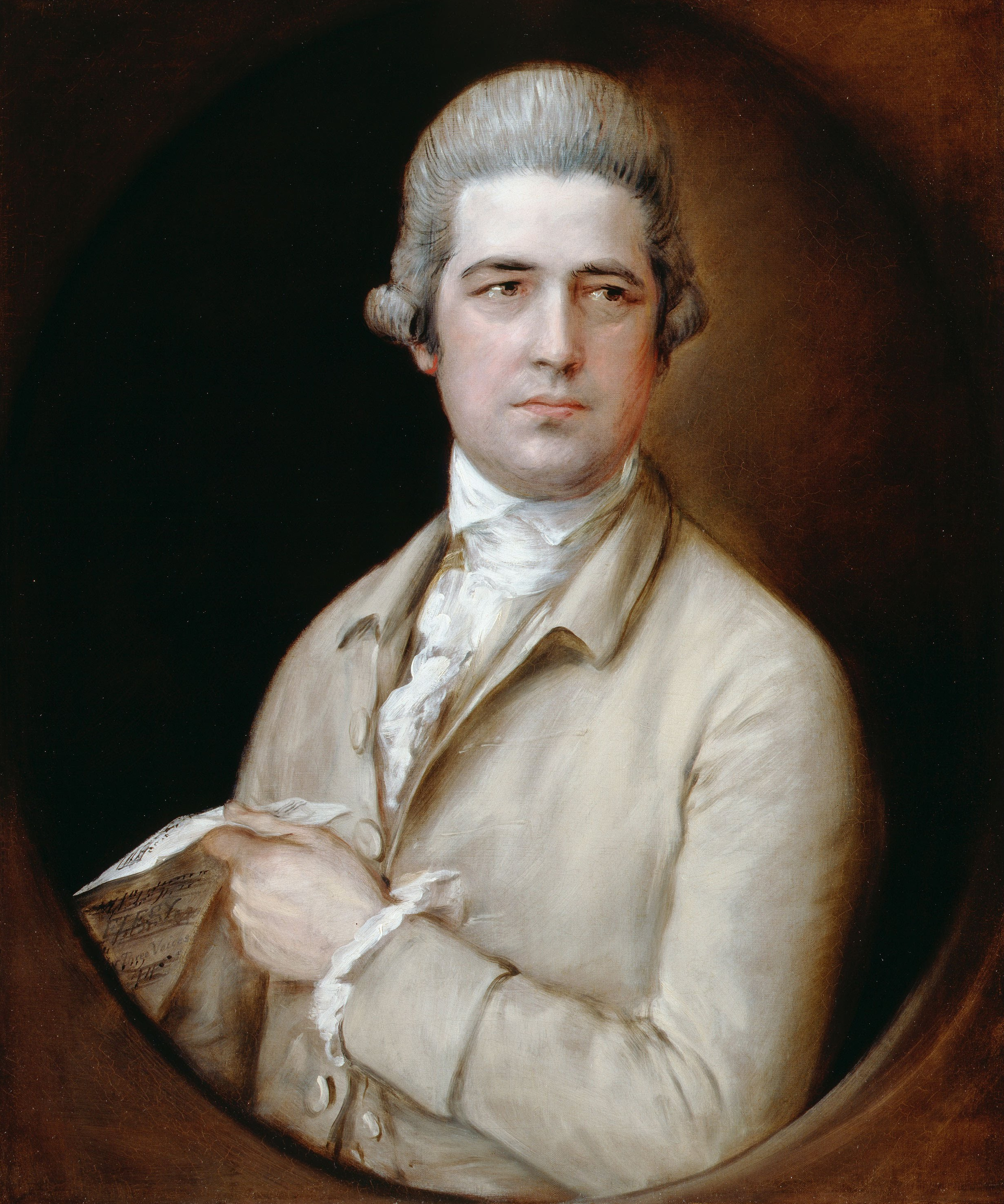
Thomas Linley the elder, William's father

William Linley's brothers

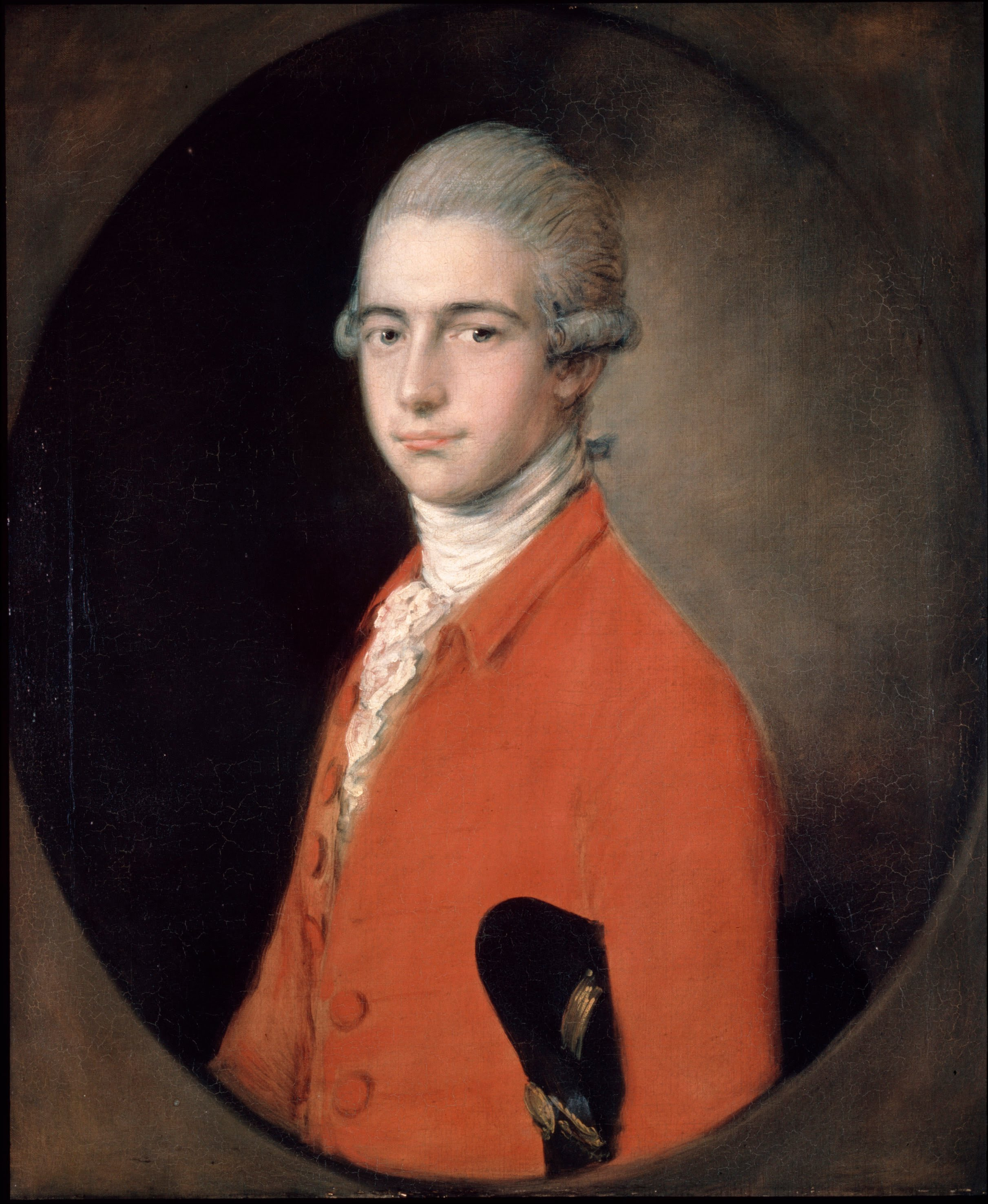
Thomas Linley the younger, William's elder brother

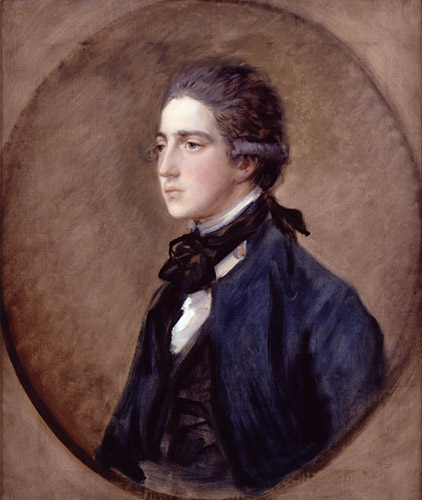
Samuel, William's brother

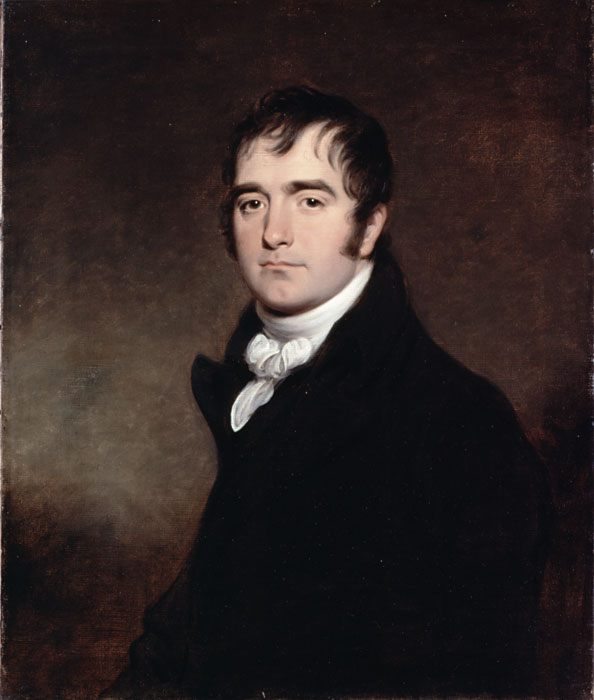
Ozias, William's brother

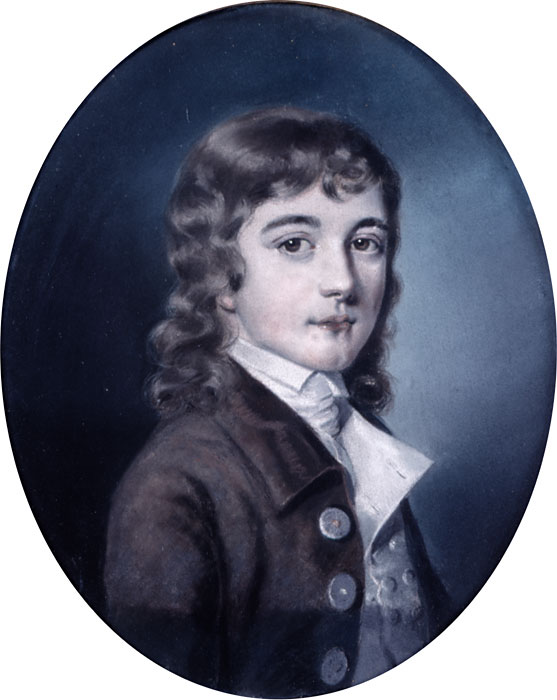
Ozias as a boy
William Linley's sisters

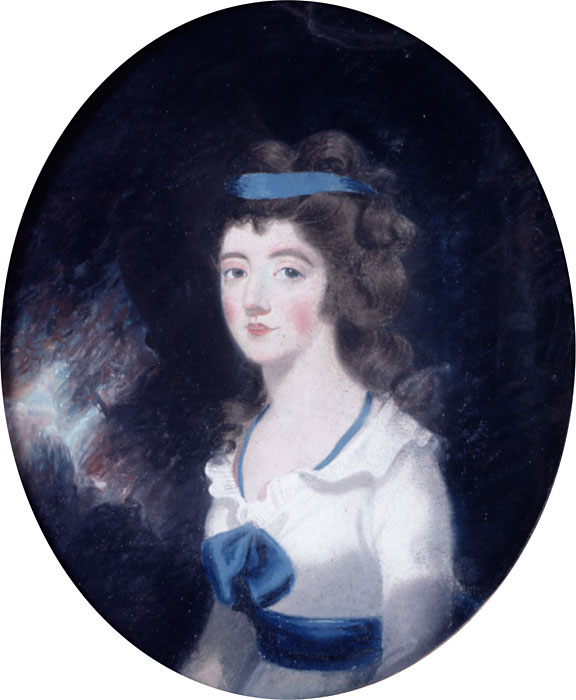
Maria, William's sister

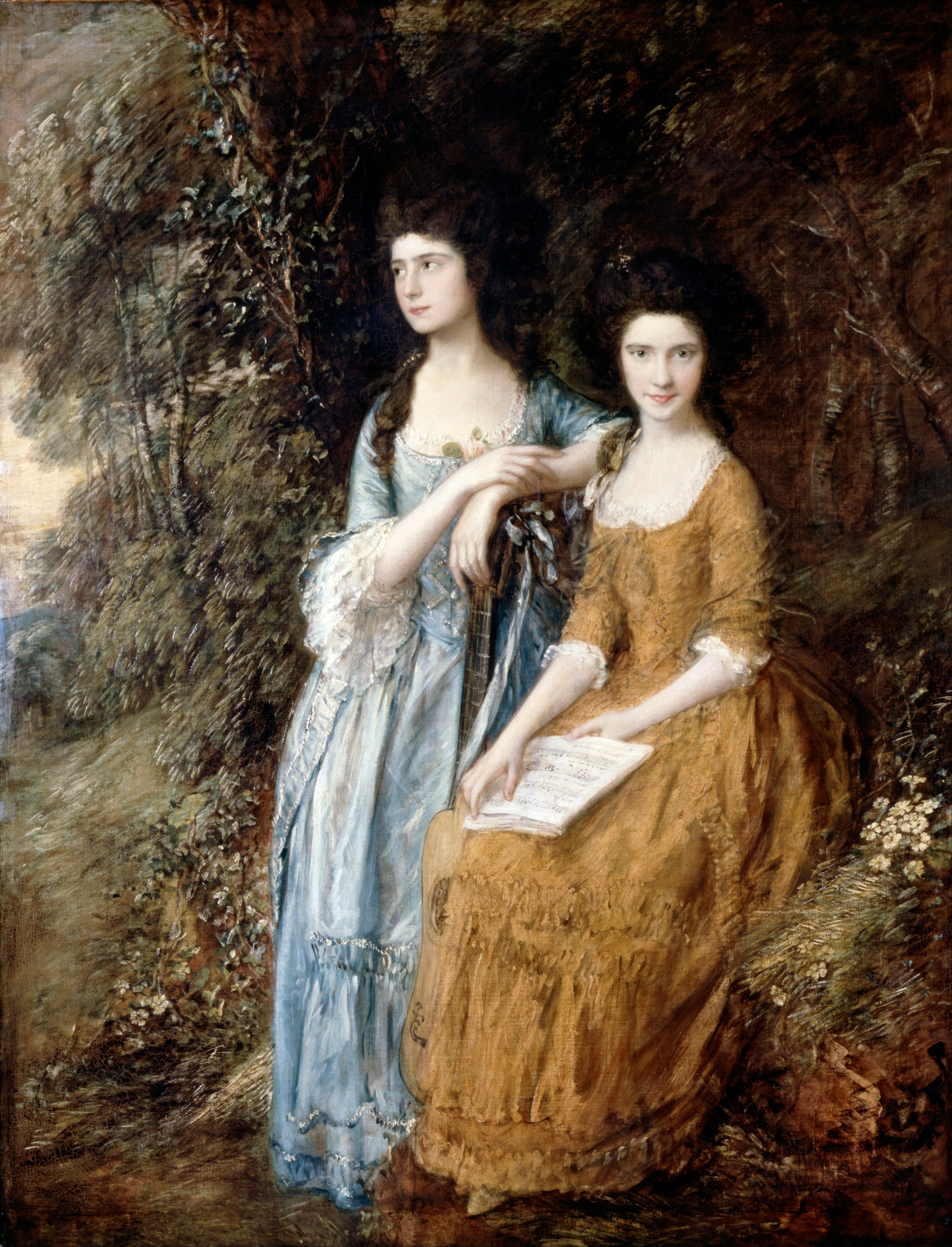
Elizabeth (left) and Mary (right), William's elder sisters

Elizabeth
