= Michael Kelly (tenor) =

Irish tenor and composer (1762–1826)

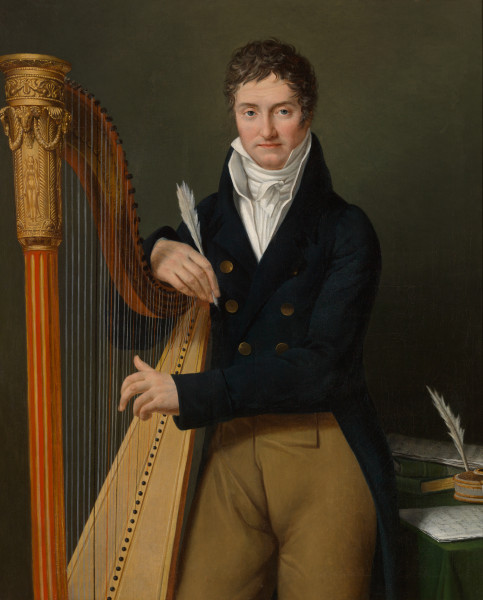
Portrait by Adèle Romany, between 1802 and 1814

Michael Kelly (25 December 1762 – 9 October 1826) was an Irish tenor, composer and theatrical manager who made an international career of importance in musical history. One of the leading figures in British musical theatre around the turn of the nineteenth century, he was a close associate of playwright and poet Richard Brinsley Sheridan. He also became friends with some of the most famous musicians in Europe of the time such as Mozart, Haydn, Storace, and Paisiello, and created roles for the operas of all three composers. With his friend and fellow singer Nancy Storace, he was one of the first tenors of that era from Britain and Ireland to become famous in Italy and Austria. In Italy he was also known as O'Kelly or even Signor Ochelli. Although the primary source for his life is his Reminiscences, doubt has been cast on the reliability of his own account, and it has been said that '[a]ny statement of Kelly's is immediately suspect.'

== Dublin beginnings ==
Michael Kelly's father Thomas, a Roman Catholic wine merchant and dancing-master, held an important social position as Master of Ceremonies at Dublin Castle, the seat of British government in Ireland. Michael was given a serious musical education (mainly voice and keyboard) from a young age, his first teachers being the Italians Passerini (of Bologna) and Niccolò Peretti, a male contralto, who sang at Covent Garden in the original productions of Thomas Arne's opera (on a Metastasio text) Artaxerxes (title role). Kelly remarked that Peretti possessed the true portamento, 'little understood by the 1820s.' With him Kelly studied the air 'In infancy our hopes and fears', composed for Peretti. Kelly also studied keyboard with Thomas Arne's son, Michael Arne.

Sent to Dr Burke's academy, Kelly met many "men of genius" at friends' houses during vacations. He received singing lessons from a "signor St Giorgio" at the Rotunda and piano lessons from Philip Cogan. Also the famous surgeon-violinist John Neale, a constant family visitor, tutored him in an aria from Vento's opera Demofoonte. At various times the visitors to the Kellys' house included such distinguished musicians as François-Hippolyte Barthélemon, Wilhelm Cramer (father of John), Thomas Pinto (grandfather of George), Johann Peter Salomon and the cellist John Crosdill.

Among them was the male soprano Venanzio Rauzzini (1746–1810), friend of Haydn and Charles Burney who, after a period at Vienna and Munich, settled in England c.1774 and was the teacher of the young Nancy Storace. While in Dublin in 1778, he took Michael Kelly under his wing, gave him lessons and taught him several songs, including his own "Fuggiamo di questo loco" (which Linley introduced into The Duenna with words by Sheridan as "By him we love offended"). Rauzzini advised he should be sent to a conservatory in Rome or Naples, and his father laid plans accordingly. Meanwhile, Michael Arne stayed in Dublin to produce Garrick's dramatic romance Cymon, for which he had written the music: in exchange for his father's kindnesses, Arne gave Michael daily lessons and regular encouragement.

Kelly also made his stage debut in Dublin. A promoter, Pedro Martini, brought an Italian company (including Peretti) to perform comic opera at the Smock Alley Theatre. Sig. Savoy, who was to have sung the high soprano role of the Count in Piccinni's La buona figliuola, was ill, and Kelly (who still sang treble) was brought in and made a great success. However Martini failed to pay, and the distinguished cast immediately struck and dispersed. Michael Arne then had him play the role of Cymon for three nights at Crow Street Theatre, and he had a benefit performance as Master Lionel in Baldassare Galuppi's Lionel and Clarissa.

== Italy, 1779–1783 ==
In May 1779, Kelly travelled to Naples where, as protégé of Sir William Hamilton, he enrolled with Fenaroli at the 1537 Conservatorio Santa Maria di Loreto, with privileges. He began to attend operas and ballets, and received introductions at many noble houses, meeting Domenico Cimarosa, Fenaroli's favourite pupil, at one. Hamilton gained him a meeting with the King and Queen of Naples, for whom he sang, and with Hamilton (a vulcanologist) he witnessed the August 1779 eruption of Vesuvius.

At Naples the male soprano Giuseppe Aprile (1732–1813) (also a teacher of Cimarosa) offered him free tuition during a festival visit to Sicily in Spring 1780. Kelly went first to Gaeta, where he sang a Salve Regina under Aprile, who continued to give him daily lessons and dinners: then to Palermo, where he studied several hours a day as his voice dropped to a tenor. He was soon singing the tenor arias which formed the original repertoire of Giacomo Davide and Giovanni Ansani (1744–1826). With Aprile he visited many noble houses and made his first regular Festival appearance at the Chiesa Grande, Palermo, in a motet of Gennario Maro. Aprile taught him the work of Metastasio and other Italian poets and, their season ended, told him he was now ready to sing in any theatre in Europe. He wrote letters of introduction to Andrea Campigli, impresario of the Florence Teatro La Pergola, and obtained Kelly's place on a ship for Livorno. "Under his care and patronage," said Aprile, "you cannot fail of success because you have the peculiar distinction of being the only public scholar I ever taught."

At Livorno, Kelly first met Stephen and Nancy Storace. Kelly tells the story that, arriving at Livorno from Sicily, he was as thin as a rake, with a mass of fair hair, and had not long ceased singing treble. Nancy and Stephen, whom he did not know, stood together on the Livorno Mole, and Nancy said in English to her brother, "Look at that girl dressed in boy's clothes." Kelly then astonished her by replying, also in English, "You are mistaken, Miss; I am a very proper he animal, and quite at your service!" Storace, aged 15, was then prima donna of the comic opera there. Stephen Storace helped him mount a concert, and with funds he went on to Pisa, met the tenor Giuseppe Viganoni (1754-1823), appeared at the theatre with soprano Clementina Baglioni, and dined with the violinist Soderini. At Florence, Campigli gave him a spring season as first comic tenor at the Teatro Nuovo, and at Lord Cowper's house he heard Pietro Nardini play Tartini's sonata. He made a successful debut in Il francese in Italia, coached by the actor-tenor Filippo Laschi), opposite the charming Signora Lortinella (called "Ortabella"), and Andrea Morigi as primo buffo. He was in lodgings with the composer Gaetano Andreozzi (1755–1826): the male soprano Tommaso Guarducci (a famous cantabile singer) gave Kelly lessons.

The offer of a five-year contract from Linley for Theatre Royal, Drury Lane, arranged by Stephen Storace, was blocked by Kelly's father. After the Florence contract Campigli offered him six months as primo tenore in Venice, and he travelled via Bologna making many musical acquaintances, but found the project had collapsed. Out of money, he still managed to attend operas and concerts and met the singer and actress Anna Benini, who took him on an autumn tour to Graz. He appeared in Pasquale Anfossi's La vera costanza, and for the Carnival opposite Benini in Grétry's Zémire et Azor. He returned to Venice for Easter and was recruited for a Brescia production of Cimarosa's Il pittor parigino, which he rehearsed and began performing with Ortabella, but the jealous sponsor-manager became murderous, and Kelly escaped to Verona, slipping out of the theatre in mid-performance.

After a benefit concert at Verona, at Treviso he met the "greatest reputed dilettante singer in Europe", Teresa de Petris. She invited Kelly to sing with her in Anfossi's new oratorio, and her consort Count Vidiman engaged him for four months, sending him first to Parma and Colorno to present himself to the Archduchess Maria Amalia of Parma, for whom he sang and played billiards for a week. He returned to Venice in October for Vidiman, where Nancy Storace was appearing in an opera of Vicente Martín y Soler. When his contract was completed, through Countess Rosenberg he (and Storace) received an invitation to join an Italian company then being assembled to occupy a permanent residency at the court of Emperor Joseph II, Holy Roman Emperor at Vienna.

== Austria, 1783–1787 ==
At Vienna Kelly presented himself to the Court composer Antonio Salieri, whose La scuola de' gelosi was to be staged first. He had a successful debut. The theatre was in the palace, and the Emperor attended performances and many rehearsals. Kelly was friendly with Salieri and with the actors Friedrich Ludwig Schröder and Johann Franz Brockmann. He went to Eisenstadt to visit Haydn for three days. In Vienna he met the composers Wanhal and Dittersdorf, but a special friendship began at a dinner where he found himself seated between Wolfgang and Constanze Mozart. He often dined with Mozart and invariably lost at billiards to him: he became close friends with Mozart's young English pupil Thomas Attwood.

Kelly sang opposite Nancy Storace in this company. In 1785, they were performing Stephen Storace's opera Gli sposi malcontenti. After she lost her voice for a time he sang in three operas with Mmes Cortellini, Antonia Bernasconi and Laschi, and won applause humorously modelling a character on the mannerisms of da Ponte in performances witnessed by that writer. He and one Calvasi played the two Antipholus roles in Storace's Gli equivoci, based on The Comedy of Errors.

Paisiello's The Barber of Seville was presented with Nancy Storace: Kelly and Mandini alternated in the role of the Count. When Paisiello came to the court Kelly witnessed his meeting with Mozart. The poet Giovanni Battista Casti also arrived, and in 1784 with Paisiello produced a new opera Il re Teodoro in Venezia. The cast included Mandini, Francesco Benucci, Francesco Bussani, Laschi, Storace and Viganoni, and Kelly took the buffo role of Gaforio, which became his nickname thereafter.

In each year the Italian company attended the Emperor to Laxenburg for three months. In Vienna, Joseph had two operas staged for the benefit of visiting potentates, Iphigénie en Tauride and L'Alceste. Kelly played in both, being Pylades to Bernasconi's Iphigénie and the Oreste of the tenor Valentin Adamberger, in all of which they were coached by Gluck in person.

In 1786, three operas were being rehearsed, one by Righini, one Salieri's La grotta di Trofonio (to a text by Casti), and one Mozart's The Marriage of Figaro. Kelly took his most famous premiere role as Don Curzio (the stuttering role), and also Don Basilio, with Storace as Susanna. He was on most friendly terms with Mozart, and was the first to hear the duet "Crudel, perche finora?" played over by Mozart while the ink was still wet. Kelly argued with Mozart, who wished him not to stutter in the concerted ensembles. Kelly insisted, threatening to walk out, and carried it off to Mozart's great satisfaction.

With new offers pending for Drury Lane, Kelly had one more Laxenburg season, and then obtained a year's leave to visit home and his ailing mother. Yet he remained until February 1787 at Vienna, appearing in Paisiello's La frascatana nobile, before setting off with Nancy and Stephen Storace and their mother, and Thomas Attwood, all together in a carriage for England. He and Mozart parted in tears of friendship. They stopped in Munich, Augsburg and Stuttgart, where Kelly went to the top of the spire with Ignace Pleyel. They witnessed some of the greatest theatrical artists performing in Paris, before arriving in London in mid-March.

== Old Drury Lane, 1787–1791 ==
In London, Kelly and Stephen Storace met at once with Thomas Linley and his daughters (Mrs. Sheridan and Mrs. Tickell), and saw John Kemble and Mrs Crouch in Richard Coeur de Lion. Kelly's Drury Lane debut was in Dibdin's Lionel and Clarissa, introducing an original duet which Storace orchestrated. He was then Young Meadows in Arne's Love in a Village, adding a Glück song in English, and next appeared at Theatre Royal opposite Mrs Crouch, who was his stage partner for many years. He became a friend of John Philpot Curran.

His entry to oratorio for Dr Arnold was delayed, but he sang in the May 1787 Handel commemoration at Westminster Abbey. In June, with Mrs Crouch in Dublin he played Lionel, and was first bacchanal in Comus, introducing the (Martini) duet 'O thou wert born to please me.' Then the pair led at York in these works, for Tate Wilkinson, also giving Arnold's Maid of the Mill and Sheridan's The Duenna at Leeds, and Love in a Village there and at Wakefield. This summer tour set the pattern for future years. For their London season commencing in September Linley revived his Selima and Azor, and Dittersdorf's Doctor and Apothecary.

In summer 1788, they toured in Liverpool, Chester, Manchester, Worcester and Birmingham, and Kelly decided not to return to Vienna. His oratorio work with Mme Mara began, and she played Mandane in Artaxerxes for him. Engaged as principal tenor of the Ancient Concerts under Joah Bates, he sang Handel's "Deeper and deeper still", and brought fresh humour to "Haste thee, nymph" (coached by Linley) to the delight of the royal audience. "In singing sacred music I was aware of its value, and fagged at the tenor songs of Handel with unremitting assiduity", he wrote. In October 1788, he sang Richard Coeur de Lion for Sheridan in London, and in Messiah with Mme Mara at Norwich Festival. With her he often performed the recitative "And Miriam the prophetess took a timbrel" from Israel in Egypt.

Kelly played Macheath for the first time in April 1789, with Mrs Crouch (Polly) and Marie Therese De Camp (Lucy). With Mrs Crouch, La Storace, Mme Mara and Dr Arnold he assisted a large Handel concert at Little Stanmore (the former home of the Duke of Chandos, where at St Lawrence's the organ had been played by Handel). Kelly scored a great hit in Storace's The Haunted Tower, delivering a ringing top B♭ in the evergreen "Spirit of my sainted sire". In August 1790, he spent some weeks with Mr and Mrs Crouch in Paris, seeing Grétry's La Caravane and Raoul Barbe-bleu, which they were to perform in English versions. They began 1791 at Drury Lane with Stephen Storace's The Siege of Belgrade (incorporating a Martini scena), and his version of Salieri's Cave of Trofonio (Prince Hoare text) was given. On 4 June, they performed The Country Girl and No song, no supper (Storace) for the very last night of the Old Drury Lane Theatre, which was then closed and demolished.

== Later life ==
Appearing in London at Drury Lane in 1787, Kelly enjoyed great success, and thenceforth was the principal English-language tenor at that theatre. In 1793, he became acting manager of the King's Theatre, and he was in great demand at concerts.

His relationship with Anna Maria Crouch, whom he shared for a time with the Prince of Wales, added to his notoriety.

In 1826, he published his entertaining Reminiscences, written with the assistance of Theodore Hook. He combined his professional work with conducting a music shop and a wine shop, but with disastrous financial results. He died at Margate, aged 64.

== See also ==
The zestful anecdotes of the Reminiscences are quoted in several articles in this encyclopedia:

- Nancy Storace - on the flamboyant virtuosity of this singer as a teenager
- Wolfgang Amadeus Mozart - his physical description of Mozart
- Mozart and dance - Mozart as a highly skilled dancer
- Haydn and Mozart - Kelly's description of a string quartet party at which Haydn and Mozart played together
- Francesco Benucci - the extraordinary effect of Mozart's Non piu andrai on its performers at the first rehearsals of The Marriage of Figaro

== Compositions ==
There is no reliable register of Kelly's compositions. In his Reminiscence he lists 62 works for various London theatres, which he had "composed and selected". This means that he often mixed his own music with that of other composers or arranged works by others to suit his purposes. In these cases, therefore, the share of his original contribution is not at all clear and may vary a lot. In a number of cases, Kelly merely wrote the melody and "relied on professional assistants in matters of orchestration and technique." It is claimed that the first Cinderella Pantomime in England was the 1804 production at Drury Lane, for which the music was by Michael Kelly. An 1801 comic opera The Gypsy Prince, written in collaboration with Thomas Moore, was not successful. Some of his original operas are:

- Blue Beard, or Female Curiosity (libretto by George Colman the Younger), "Grand Dramatic Romance"; London, Theatre Royal, Drury Lane, 16 January 1798.
- Pizarro (Richard Brinsley Sheridan), musical play; London, Theatre Royal, Drury Lane, 24 May 1799.
- Love Laughs at Locksmith (George Colman the Younger), comic opera; London, Theatre Royal, Haymarket, 25 July 1803.

Kelly also wrote many songs, one of the best-known being The Woodpecker to words by Thomas Moore.

== Recordings ==
Recordings of Kelly's music are extremely rare. They can be found on one 1971 LP and two CDs issued in 2011 and 2012.

- Michael Kelly & Mozart, performed by Sasha Abrams (S), Dan Klein (tenor), Peter Alexander (piano): Decca Ace of Diamonds SDD 273 (LP, 1971). Contains the songs: Cara son tuo così, Soffri che intraccia, The Woodpecker, Placa gli sdegni tuoi, Rui seize thee, as well as the Kelly/Mozart collaboration Grazie agl'inganni tuoi.
- Entertaining Miss Austen. Newly discovered music from Jane Austen's family collection, performed by Amanda Pitt (soprano), John Lofthouse (baritone), David Owen Norris (piano): Dutton Epoch CDLX 7271 (CD, 2011). Contains the songs: The Wife's Farewell, The Husband's Return.
- English and Scottish Romantic Songs, performed by Gudrún Ólafsdóttir (mezzo) and Francisco Javier Jáuregui (guitar): EMEC Discos E-104 (CD, 2012). Contains the song Flora McDonald in a 19th-century arrangement with guitar by C.M. Sola.
