= The Linley Sisters =

Painting by Thomas Gainsborough

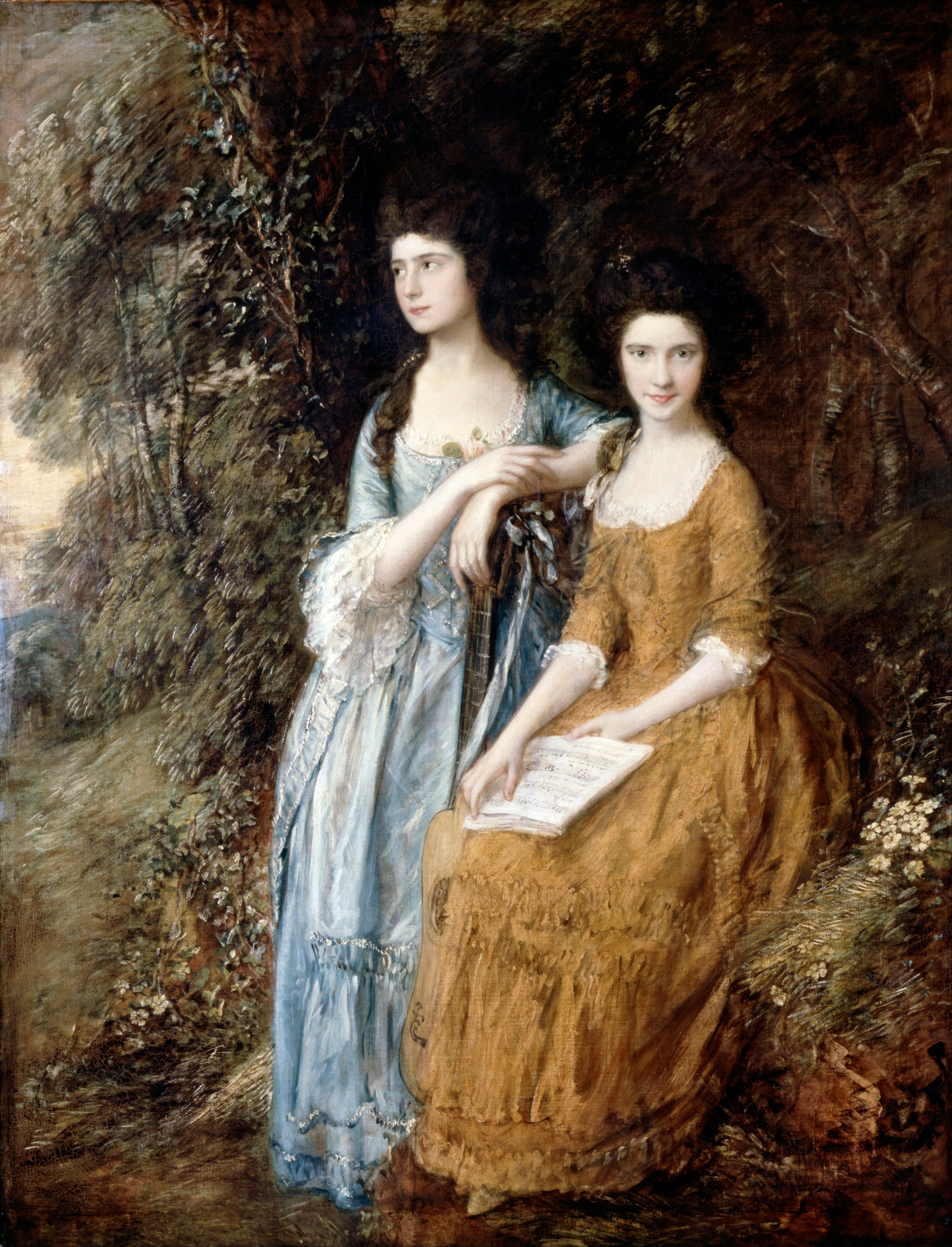
- Artist: Thomas Gainsborough
- Year: 1772
- Type: Oil on canvas, portrait painting
- Dimensions: 199 cm × 153.5 cm (78 in × 60.4 in)
- Location: Dulwich Picture Gallery, London

The Linley Sisters is an oil on canvas portrait painting by the British artist Thomas Gainsborough, from 1772.

== History and description ==
It depicts the singers Elizabeth Ann Linley and her younger sister Mary Linley. Gainsborough was at the time a Bath-based painter focusing on society portraits. The sisters were part of the musical Linley Family based in the city, both daughters of Thomas Linley the elder. Elizabeth famously eloped with the playwright Richard Brinsley Sheridan. The two sisters are shown in a natural setting. One of them is seated, with a music book on her lap, while she looks smiling to the viewer. The other sister is up and rests calmly her shoulder upon her sibling, as she looks to the left.

The painting was displayed at the Royal Academy's Summer Exhibition of 1772 at Pall Mall along with another Gainsborough work Portrait of Sir William Pulteney. In 1785 it was retouched by Gainsborough at the request of the Linley family to make the costumes of the style-conscious sisters reflect the current fashion. In 1835 it was donated by their brother William Linley to the Dulwich Picture Gallery and remains in the collection there.

== See also ==
- Mrs. Richard Brinsley Sheridan, a 1787 portrait of Elizabeth Linley by Gainsborough

== Bibliography ==
- Hamilton, James. Gainsborough: A Portrait. Hachette UK, 2017.
- Jones, Rica. Thomas Gainsborough. Harry N. Abrams, 2009.
- Lindsay, Jack. Thomas Gainsborough: His Life and Art. Granada, 1981.
- Waterhouse, Ellis Kirkham. Gainsborough. Spring Books, 1966.
