= Lynley =

Lynley is a given name. Notable people with the name include:

- Carol Lynley (1942–2019), American actress and former child model
- Lynley Dodd (born 1941), New Zealand children's book author and illustrator
- Lynley Edmeades, New Zealand poet, academic and editor
- Lynley Hamilton (born 1959), Australian cricketer
- Lynley Hannen (born 1964), New Zealand rower
- Lynley Hood (born 1942), New Zealand author
- Lynley Marshall, British medical researcher
- Lynley Pedruco (née Lucas) (born 1960), New Zealand association football player
- Lynley Wallis, Australian archeologist

== In fiction ==
- Margo Lynley, character in the soap opera The Bold and the Beautiful
- Thomas Lynley, English police officer, protagonist of novels by Elizabeth George
  - The Inspector Lynley Mysteries (2001–2008), BBC TV series based on the novels
  - Lynley (TV series) (2025), BBC TV series based on the novels

== See also ==
- Lynley Ridge, Alberta, Canada
- Linley (disambiguation)
