= Thomas Chilcot =

English organist and composer

Thomas Chilcot (1707? – 1766), was an English organist and composer.

== Life ==
Thomas Chilcot of Bath, Somerset was born in the West of England (probably Bath) in or about 1707. He was the son of John Chilcot and Elizabeth Powell. Records of his birth, like most other records from his life, are now lost. Chilcot was educated at Bath Charity School, whose headmaster, Henry Dixon, had a strong interest in church music. On 6 July 1721 Chilcot (presumably aged 14) was apprenticed to Josiah Priest, the organist of Bath Abbey since 1714 - seemingly the only occasion on which the school allowed a pupil to be apprenticed to a musician. On Priest's death, just four years later, Chilcot was made Abbey organist on a probationary basis. At what should have been the conclusion of Chilcot's apprenticeship, in 1728, the appointment was made permanent. As City musician in fashionable Bath, Chilcot rapidly established a remarkable relationship with many noble families, attracting their patronage and subscriptions to his publications. He became a member and subsequently Grand Master of the Royal Cumberland Lodge of Freemasons. He was also amongst the original members of the Royal Society of Musicians, founded in 1738/1739.

As well as his work at the Abbey, Chilcot organised and directed some ambitious choral concerts (at which he played his own concertos) and appears also to have run a small instrument hire business.

He married Elizabeth Mills of Bath in 1729 and had seven children, of whom four survived. Following Elizabeth's death, he married Anne Wrey, a member of a prominent West Country family (the Wrey baronets), in 1749.

Chilcot died suddenly on 24 November 1766, after occupying a highly influential role in Bath for forty years. Almost no public notice was taken of his death and a complicated disagreement over Chilcot's estate meant that none of the elaborate arrangements that the composer had made for his own funeral procession, monument and memorial trusts, was ever carried out.

== Works ==
Chilcot's unpublished music, including at least four anthems, a Jubilate, an oratorio called Elfrida and what a posthumous auction catalogue describes as "his finest pieces of Music ... never Printed or Sold", has not survived.

His published music consists of:

- Six Suites of Lessons for the Harpsicord or Spinet (London, Wm Smith, 1734). Modern edition by Davitt Moroney, Le Pupitre (Paris, Heugel & cie, 1981)
- Twelve English Songs with their symphonies. The words by Shakespeare and other Celebrated Poets. (William Shakespeare, Christopher Marlowe, Anacreon, and Euripides) (London, John Johnson, [1744])
- Six Concertos, for the Harpsichord (London, John Johnson, 1756) (dedicated to Lady Elizabeth Bathurst)
- Six Concertos, for the Harpsichord (Bath, privately, 1765/1766)

== Bibliography ==
"Chilcot, Thomas" . Dictionary of National Biography. London: Smith, Elder & Co. 1885–1900.

B.J. Maslen: ‘Thomas Chilcot: a Forgotten Composer’, Musical Quarterly, lxvi (1943), 294–5

David Falconer: Bath Abbey: its Choirs & its Music (Bath, 1984)

Tim Rishton: Thomas Chilcot and his Concertos (PhD thesis, U. of Wales, Bangor, 1991)

Tim Rishton: ‘The Eighteenth-Century British Keyboard Concerto after Handel’, Aspects of Keyboard Music: Essays in Honour of Susi Jeans, ed. R. Judd (Oxford, 1992), 121–39

Tim Rishton: 'Chilcot, Thomas', article in New Grove Dictionary of Music and Musicians

Seraphic Lays': Thomas Chilcot 1707-1766, Hexachord: The Journal of Early Music Wales vol II no. 2 (February 2000), 4–13

Tim Rishton: 'The twelve harpsichord concertos of Thomas Chilcot', Early Keyboard Journal Vol 23 (2005), 33-66
