= Richard Tickell =

English writer

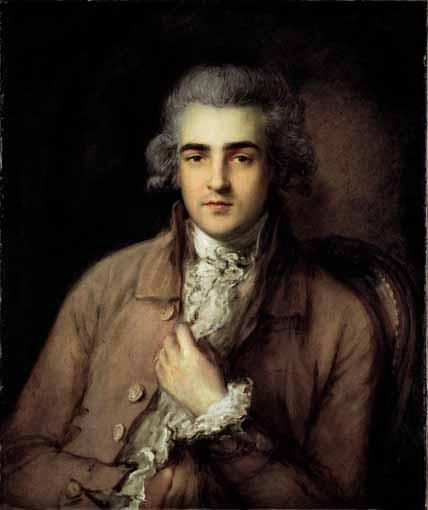
Portrait of Richard Tickell by Thomas Gainsborough (c. 1778–1780)

Richard Tickell (1751–1793) was an English playwright and satirist.

He was the second son of the three sons and two daughters of John Tickell (1729–1782), a clerk in chancery, and magistrate in Dublin, and his wife Esther Pierson, and thus he was a grandson of the poet Thomas Tickell, who married the Irish heiress Clotilde Eustace, daughter of Sir Maurice Eustace of Harristown.

Before his birth, his father had moved the family to New Windsor, Berkshire, as a result of disturbances in Dublin, so Richard Tickell is said to have been born at Bath, where he later built Beaulieu House, Newbridge Hill. Richard may have been educated at Harrow or Winchester and may have been an assistant at Eton, although this is contentious. He definitely entered the Middle Temple on 8 November 1768 to read for the law, and was later appointed as one of the sixty commissioners in bankruptcy. In 1778 he was deprived of this place, but regained it after his acquaintance David Garrick successfully petitioned Lord Chancellor Bathurst.

Sheridan persuaded Tickell to use his satirical talent in support of Charles James Fox. On 15 October 1778 Tickell's musical entertainment The Camp was a success at the Theatre Royal, Drury Lane. Three weeks later, Tickell declined to write a prologue for Garrick, due to other commitments, such as writing the satirical pamphlet "Anticipation". On 25 July 1780 Tickell married Mary Linley (1758–1787), a singer and a sister-in-law of Richard Brinsley Sheridan. Tickell is said already to have had a family with a live-in mistress, referred to as Miss B. After his marriage, he was given a set of rooms in Hampton Court Palace. His opera in three acts The Carnival of Venice was successfully produced at Drury Lane, with its first performance on 13 December 1781. For this, Tickell's sister-in-law Elizabeth Linley wrote some of the songs, and his wife Mary the music. His adaptation of The Gentle Shepherd by Allan Ramsay, first performed on 27 May 1789, was his last work for the theatre.

Some of his other plays and his pamphlets include:

- "The Wreath of Fashion" (1778)
- "The Green Box of Monsieur de Sartine", an adaptation from the French (1779)

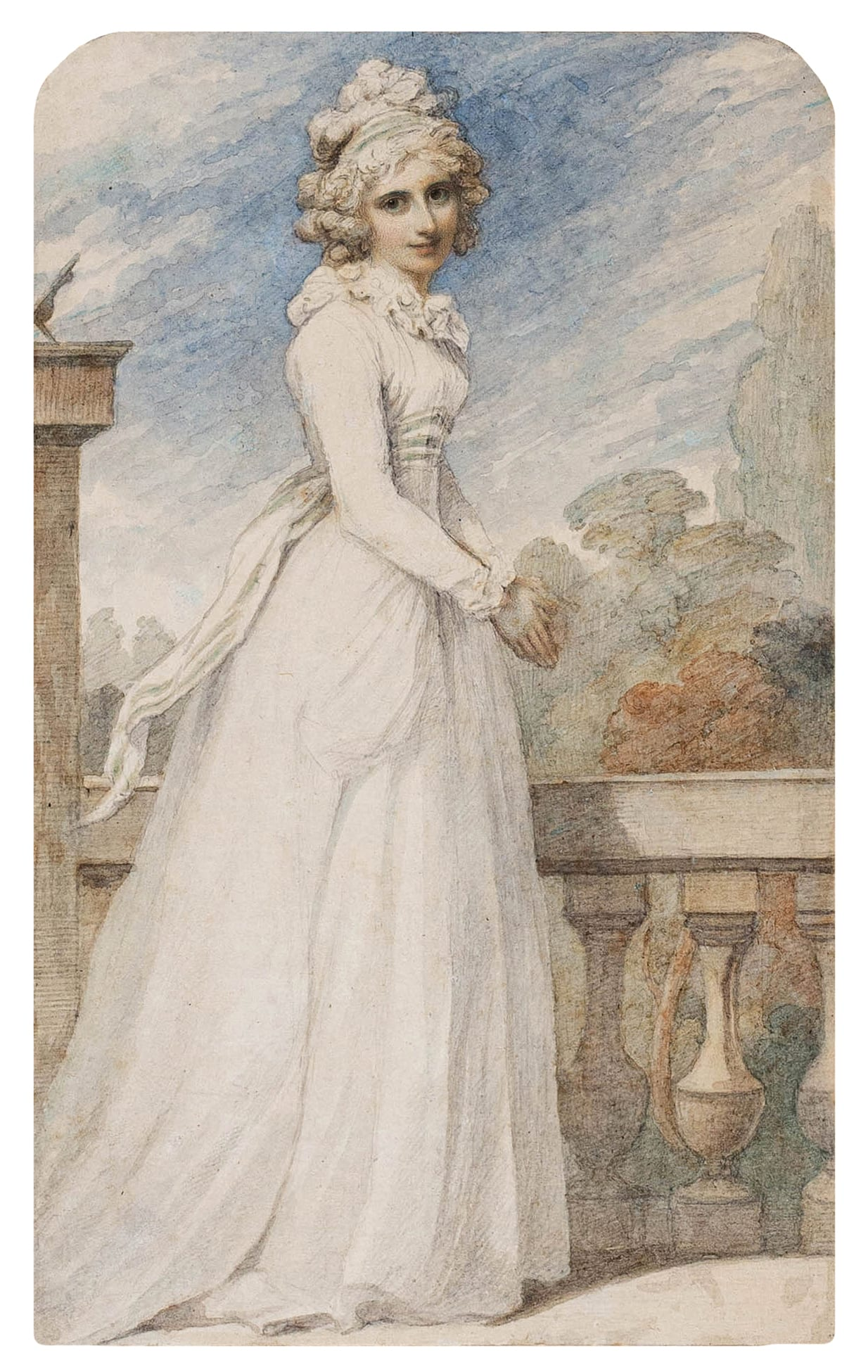
Sarah Ley by Richard Cosway

Tickell's second wife, whom he married in 1789, was Sarah, a beautiful girl of eighteen, daughter of Captain Ley of the East India Company's service and the Berrington, an East Indiaman. However, in 1793 financial difficulties led him into depression and ultimately to suicide on 4 November of that year, when he jumped from the parapet outside the window of his rooms at Hampton Court. Sheridan later convinced the coroner to return a verdict of accidental death, and took the children of Tickell's first marriage into his care, obtaining admission into the Navy for Richard Tickell (1782–1805), and a writership in India for Samuel (1785–1817). R. E. Tickell maintained that the third child of this marriage was a daughter, Elizabeth Anne (1781–1860), who was unmarried when she died at her home in Bedford Square, London. It is certain, however, that Tickell had another daughter, Zipporah, who later married Ebenezer Roebuck, an employee of the East India Company, and became the mother of John Arthur Roebuck (1802–1879). Tickell's second wife's behaviour after his death gained her the censure of their contemporaries, as she was said to have had a small dowry but expensive tastes, keeping a coach and four but not paying her husband's debts. In 1796 she married again, John Cotton Worthington, a Major in the Sussex fencible cavalry.
