= Thomas Le Fanu (priest) =

Irish dean

Thomas Philip Le Fanu (1784–1845) was an Irish Dean in the first half of the 19th century. He was the son of Joseph Le Fanu and Alicia Sheridan, and the father of Joseph Sheridan Le Fanu and William Richard Le Fanu. He married Emma Lucretia Dobbin.

He was Dean of Emly and rector of Abington, Limerick from 1826 to 1845. Prior to this position, he was chaplain at the Royal Hibernian Military School in Phoenix Park, Dublin.

He died in Abington Glebe House on 20 June 1845. He was buried in the grounds of Abington Church.

Church of Ireland titles
Preceded by Henry Vesey-Fitzgerald	Dean of Emly; 1826–1845	Succeeded by Brabazon William Disney
