= Richard Coeur de Lion (play) =

Richard Coeur de Lion: An historical romance is a 1786 semi-opera with an English text by John Burgoyne set to music by Thomas Linley the Elder. It was first staged at Drury Lane Theatre in October 1786. It was a translation of Michel-Jean Sedaine's opera Richard Coeur-de-lion about the life of the English Monarch Richard I with the ending significantly changed. The work was a major success and ran for 43 performances and was revived seven times before the end of the century. By contrast a rival version staged at the Covent Garden Theatre at the same time was a failure.

== Bibliography ==
- Fenner, Theodore. Opera in London: Views of the Press, 1785-1830. Southern Illinois University Press, 1994.
- Thomson, Peter. The Cambridge Introduction to English Theatre, 1660-1900. Cambridge University Press, 2006.
- Nicoll, Allardyce. A History of English Drama 1660-1900. Volume III: Late Eighteenth Century Drama. Cambridge University Press, 1952.
