= William Richard Le Fanu =

Irish railway engineer

- Born: 1816
- Died: 1894 (aged 77–78)
- Occupations: Railway engineer and Commissioner of Public Works
- Spouse: Henrietta Victorine Barrington
- Relatives: Reverend Thomas Philip Le Fanu (father), Joseph Sheridan Le Fanu, novelist (brother)

William Richard Le Fanu (24 February 1816 – 8 September 1894) was an Irish railway engineer and Commissioner of Public Works. Le Fanu was born at the Royal Hibernian Military School in Dublin into a literary family of Huguenot, Irish and English descent.

== Biography ==
Born in Dublin, Le Fanu attended Trinity College Dublin. He was apprenticed to and became assistant to Sir John Benjamin Macneill. His most notable projects were railway schemes in Ireland. In 1846 he was appointed resident engineer in the completion of the Cork railway terminal. He then succeeded MacNeill as consulting engineer to the railway and supervised various line extensions including those to Roscrea, Parsonstown and Nenagh. Le Fanu was appointed to the Board of Public Works in 1863, first as deputy Chairman later as chairman.

== Projects ==
- Cork railway terminal
- Knocknadundarragh viaduct, Borris, County Carlow
- Cahir railway viaduct
