= Patrick Sheridan (bishop of Cloyne) =

Dr. Patrick Sheridan (c. 1638 – 22 November 1682) was the Church of Ireland Bishop of Cloyne between 1679 and 1682.

== Early years ==
Sheridan was born at Enniskillen, County Fermanagh, Ireland, the son of Reverend Dennis Sheridan, rector of Killesher parish, County Fermanagh. His brothers included William Sheridan (Bishop of Kilmore and Ardagh) and Sir Thomas Sheridan (politician), Chief Secretary of State for Ireland (1687–1688). His primary school teachers were Sheridan, Bedloe and Wilson.

== Trinity College, Dublin ==
On 15 May 1652 at the age of 14, Sheridan entered Trinity College, Dublin and later graduated from there as a Master of Arts. In 1660 he became a Fellow of the College, on 20 November 1665 a Senior Fellow, in 1666 a Vice-Provost and in 1681 he became a Doctor of Divinity at the same university.

== Career ==
On 31 May 1662 he was appointed rector of Clonfeacle parish, County Armagh. On 12 August 1664 he was appointed Archdeacon of Dromore. On 9 November 1667 he was appointed Dean of Connor. In 1668 he was appointed rector of Conwal Parish Church (Church of Ireland) in Raphoe Diocese.

== Bishop of Cloyne ==
He was nominated as Bishop of Cloyne on 11 February and was consecrated at Cashel Cathedral in Cashel, County Tipperary on 27 April 1679 by the Archbishop of Cashel, Thomas Price, assisted by the bishops of Killaloe, Waterford and Cork. He later applied to James Butler, 1st Duke of Ormonde to be appointed Bishop of Derry but Sir Leoline Jenkins objected because Sheridan was notorious for his non-residency in the diocese of Cloyne. Sheridan died in Dublin on 22 November 1682 and is buried in the chapel of Trinity College, but no headstone remains.

== Family ==
In 1677 Sheridan married Anne Hill, widow of Lieutenant-Colonel Moyses Hill and the daughter and co-heir of Francis Hill and Ursula Stafford of Hill Hall, Drumbeg, County Down. They had no children and she died in July 1683.
