= Maria Linley =

English singer (1763–1784)

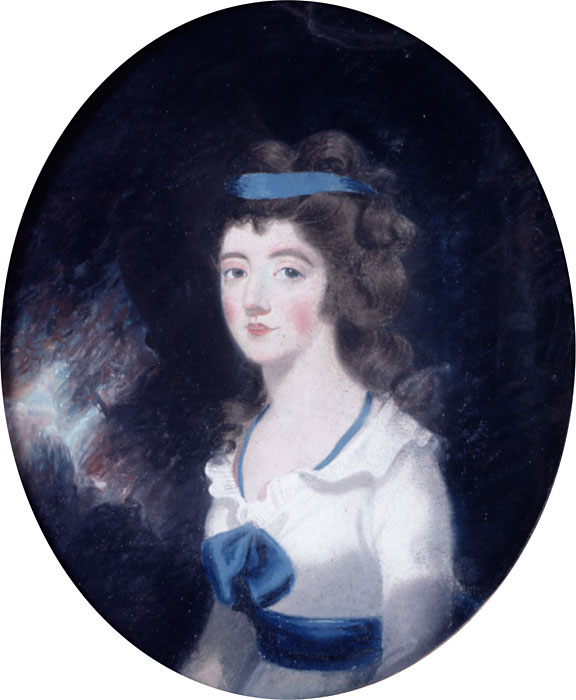
- Maria Linley, c. 1784, by Thomas Lawrence
- Born: 10 October 1763; Bath, Somerset, England
- Died: 5 September 1784 (aged 20); Bath, Somerset, England
- Occupation: Singer
- Father: Thomas Linley the elder

Maria Linley (10 October 1763 – 5 September 1784) was an English singer.

== Biography ==
Maria Linley was born on 10 October 1763 and christened two months later on 10 December, at Bath. She was trained as a singer by her father Thomas Linley the elder (one of seven musical siblings born to him and his wife, Mary Johnson). She performed in the Drury Lane oratorios and in concerts, possessing a voice similar to that of her other family members. As she matured, her behaviour changed and she became awkward and "eccentric", leading to arguments with her father, so she left home to stay with her older sister, Mary. Unhappy at having to sleep in a small attic room, she left her sister's house and moved in with a female friend with whom she shared a bed.

When she was twenty years old, in 1784, she went to live in the home of her grandparents in Bath but became very ill soon after her arrival. Maria died on 5 September 1784 from a "brain fever". Her burial place is in Walcot, Bath.

She was also sketched by the British artist Samuel Shelley as Saint Cecilia, patron saint of musicians.
