= Elizabeth Ann Linley =

English singer (1754–1792)

Mrs Richard Brinsley Sheridan, aged 31, by Thomas Gainsborough, (National Gallery of Art)

Elizabeth Ann Sheridan (née Linley; September 1754 – 28 June 1792) was an English singer who was known to have possessed great beauty. She was the subject of several paintings by Thomas Gainsborough, who was a family friend, Joshua Reynolds and Richard Samuel. An adept poet and writer, she became involved with the Blue Stockings Society and participated in Whig politics.

The second of twelve children, and the first daughter of the composer Thomas Linley and his wife Mary Johnson, Elizabeth was herself the wife of the leading playwright Richard Brinsley Sheridan. She was one of the most noted soprano singers of her day, though her husband discouraged her from performing in public after their marriage. Her early life was spent in Bath, the town of her birth, and she probably first appeared on stage beside her brother, Thomas, in 1767 although she started singing in concerts when she was nine years old. The Maid of Bath, a comedy that dramatised and ridiculed her life story, played for 24 nights at the Haymarket Theatre in 1771.

An engagement to a wealthy elderly suitor at the end of 1770 was called off just prior to the anticipated wedding; Elizabeth later eloped to France with Sheridan and a marriage ceremony may have taken place in March 1772 although no records of the matrimony exist. The couple returned to Britain in late April and a formal marriage took place in 1773. Sheridan defended Elizabeth's honour twice during 1772 in duels with a married man, "Captain" Thomas Mathews, who had amorously pursued her.

The Sheridans' relationship was stormy, and both parties had affairs; Elizabeth also had several miscarriages and a stillborn baby before producing a son, Thomas, born in November 1775. One of Elizabeth's lovers was Lord Edward FitzGerald, who was the father of her daughter born on 30 March 1792. Elizabeth had suffered ill-health for some time, which the traumatic labour exacerbated. She died of tuberculosis in June 1792.

== Early life ==
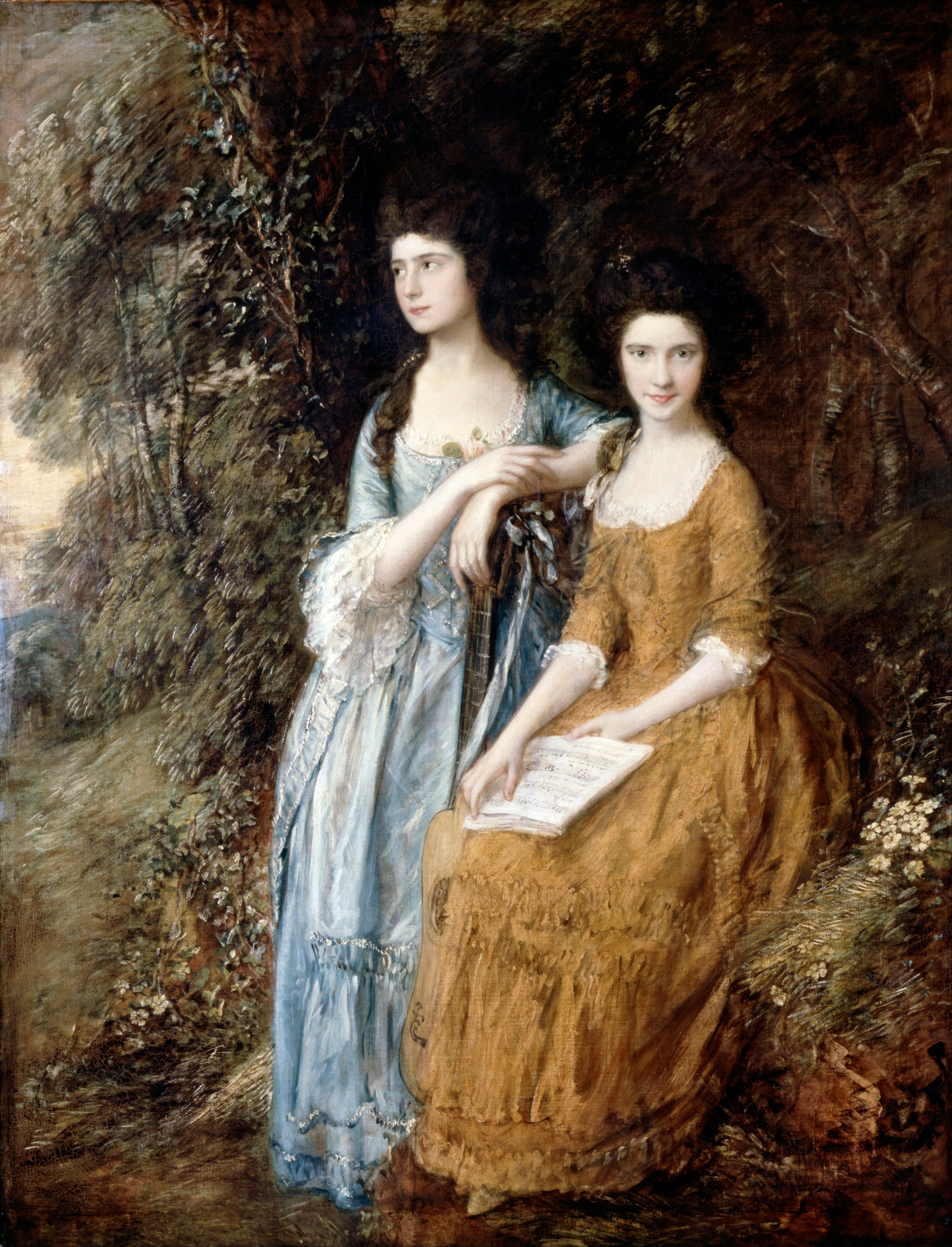
The Linley Sisters, by Thomas Gainsborough (Dulwich Picture Gallery) – Elizabeth (left, standing, aged 17) with her sister Mary

Elizabeth Ann Sheridan (née Linley) was born towards the end of 1754, but the exact date varies with sources giving 4, 5 or 7 September, at either Abbey Green or 5 Pierrepont Street, Bath. Her father was Thomas Linley, an English musician and composer, and her mother was Mary Johnson (1729–1820), who was also a talented musician. Elizabeth was baptised at St Michael's church, Bath on 25 September 1754.

Elizabeth was the couple's eldest daughter (there was an older brother but he died in early childhood), and like several of her siblings she inherited her parents' musical abilities. Her general schooling was provided by her mother although one, possibly two, years were spent at a school in Bristol where she was taught the rudiments of French conversation, dancing, drawing, painting and deportment. It is likely that she began singing at concerts when she was only nine years old, and she made her formal stage début alongside her brother, also named Thomas, in 1767 at Covent Garden, London. The concert, or masque, featured music by Bach and was called The Fairy Favour. Elizabeth sang and her brother played the part of Puck.

Their father was rigid in his enforcement of the children's schedules, making them perform weekly in concerts at Bath and at venues in Oxford and London. Mary Dewes, (Note: Mary Dewes was the niece of bluestocking Mary Delany; the letter from Dewes to her brother that mentions the concert was published in Delany's memoirs.) a concert attendee, expressed the view that he overworked them and required Elizabeth to perform songs which were too difficult for her age. Elizabeth was under indenture to her father as a music apprentice, which ensured that her performances increased his earnings. To manage her image, her father carefully selected the venues where she could perform, to ensure that she sang at only high-society festivals and avoided the pitfalls of performing on the London stage. Among the venues he selected as her manager were his concerts in Bath and the Three Choirs Festival, which included tours at Gloucester Cathedral, Hereford Cathedral, and Worcester Cathedral, as well as performances in Cambridge, Chester, London, Oxford, and Salisbury. The tours were lavish events accompanied by social gatherings held apart from the concert appearance, wherein Elizabeth and the other performers were expected to entertain for several hours prior to each performance.

In selecting a repertoire to enhance Elizabeth's fame, her father eliminated popular songs, instead choosing regional ballads with "impeccable national pedigree" and classics, centred on Handel. Among her noted performances include the May 1768 performance as Galatea in Acis and Galatea, which then became a staple in her repertoire. Contemporary critics, such as Fanny Burney, Daniel Lyons and Gaspare Pacchierotti, noted that her voice with its clear, unaffected, sweet expression was particularly compatible with Handel's oratorial style. These same traits used to describe her voice were also attributed to her behaviour by the composer William Jackson, Charles Burney and others, adding to the public's admiration of Elizabeth, propelling her to be for a time the most celebrated singer in England, as well as the object of cult-like devotion by her admirers. Jackson, a composer from Exeter, Linley family friend, and author of Observations on the Present State of Music in London (1791) wrote music specifically for Elizabeth to perform.

Although Handel's works formed the core of Elizabeth's repertoire, William Jackson and both her brother and father composed music particularly for her. Though much of her father's work from his Bath period has not survived, Jackson's Twelve Songs (1765–1770) and Twelve Canzonets (circa 1770) were crafted to suit Elizabeth's young voice. Elizabeth was advertised in local newspapers as the soloist of the concert featuring Joseph Wharton's Ode to Fancy and Jackson's Lycidas which was performed on 26 November 1767. (Note: There is some dispute among scholars as to which version of Ode to Fancy was sung. Jackson published his Ode to Fancy in 1770, though it could have been written earlier. Richard McGrady argues in The Elegies of William Jackson and Thomas Linley the Elder that the 1767 performance was set to music by Charles Rousseau Burney.) The cantata In yonder grove for Elizabeth's March 1773 final public performance was written by her brother Thomas, for which she penned the lyric. The aria was written to feature her vocal flexibility and specifically amplify the dramatic flair of her range. Many songs which were included in her performances invoked songbirds, such as Handel's aria "Sweet Bird" in L'Allegro, il Penseroso ed il Moderato, lark references of Semele, and her own verse in In yonder grove which speaks of the nightingale's song. Repeated linking of Elizabeth's voice and birds, was a device used to call attention to the specific qualities of her voice and raise the public appreciation of her natural abilities. George III saw her performing at Drury Lane; he was impressed and invited the family to entertain the Queen at Buckingham Palace in April 1773. The audience comprised the King, Queen and their family plus one female guest; the private concert lasted for five hours, for which the King paid Linley £100 (equivalent to £13,000 in 2025 (Note: UK Consumer Price Index inflation figures from 1209–2024 based on data from "Inflation calculator", Bank of England, London, 18 February 2026)).

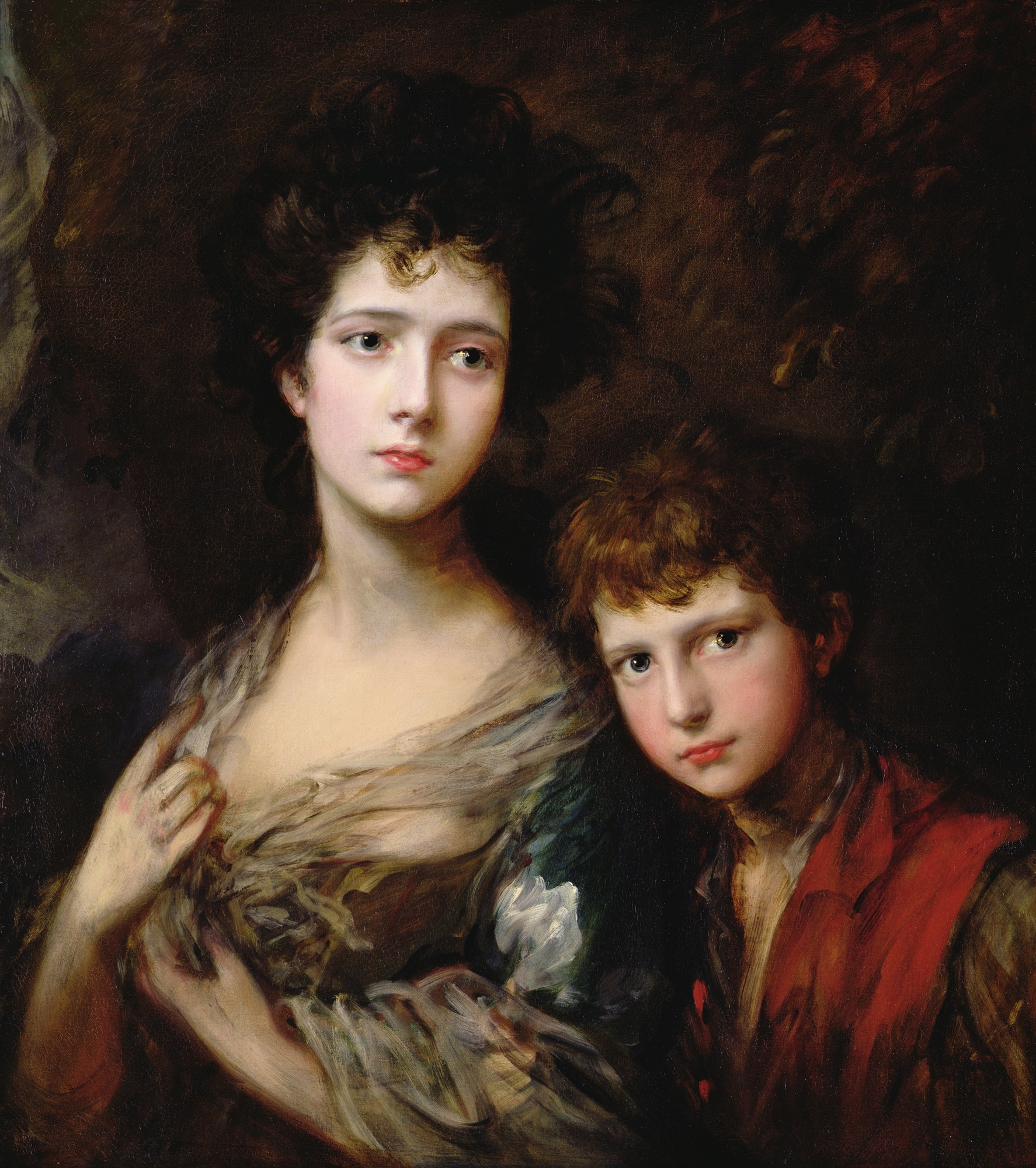
Thomas Gainsborough's 1768 painting of Elizabeth with her brother Thomas; the original title prior to 1817 was A Beggar Boy and Girl.

Elizabeth became properly acquainted with Richard Brinsley Sheridan in October 1770, not long after the Sheridan family arrived in Bath. The Sheridans were invited to the Linley home as Elizabeth's father was seeking to impress Thomas Sheridan with the grandeur of his house while Sheridan wished to elicit help gaining new students. A close friendship soon developed between the teenage members of the families. At the end of the year, she was betrothed to an elderly but wealthy suitor, Walter Long, but the engagement was broken off shortly before the date set for the wedding. Reports vary as to why the engagement was broken; Elizabeth's sister-in-law, Elizabeth Sheridan wrote that Linley had advised Long she would never be happy in their marriage, prompting him to withdraw his suit. Other reports indicate that the characterization of Long in the play The Maid of Bath written by Samuel Foote was the cause of the break. The play, which opened on 26 June 1771 was a new comedy, which premiered at the Haymarket Theatre, dramatising Linley's story. It played for 24 nights in London and was very popular but made Elizabeth a figure of ridicule. Yet other reports indicate that Long was put off by the attention of so many other men. Whatever the reason, the engagement was severed; Long paid her compensation of £3,000 in 1771 (equivalent to £438,000 in 2025), and she also received £1,000 worth of clothing and jewellery.

The unwanted attention from men continued, and Elizabeth became fearful of the lewd intentions of those who tried to court her. Among the men who were infatuated with her was Charles Sheridan, Richard's older brother, and Nathaniel Brassey Halhed. She was particularly worried about the advances made by 'Captain' Thomas Mathews, a married man. (Note: Mathews was an ensign and did not hold the rank of captain.) The Linley family had made his acquaintance when he moved to Bath in 1770; a descendant of Thomas Mathews, he had resigned his military career when he married. He amorously pursued Elizabeth despite his marital status, sexually harassing her and threatening to rape her. Still feeling mocked by the Maid of Bath comedy, Elizabeth endured further ridicule when her father and William Herschel had a strong public disagreement over whether she would sing at a benefit organised by Herschel. The acerbic exchanges between the two men were in the form of newspaper articles published in January 1772; life for Elizabeth was becoming unbearable and she wanted to escape. Contemplating suicide, and unable to discuss her concerns with her parents, Elizabeth turned to her friend Alicia Sheridan for help. The pair came up with a plan but although Alicia thought the idea to flee to a convent in France was romantic, she expressed reservations and wanted to discuss it with Richard, unaware of his own deepening affection towards Elizabeth.

In early March 1772 Elizabeth's agitation increased; she was short of breath, suffered headaches and continually argued with her father, refusing to willingly take part in performances. Sheridan went to visit her on a Sunday morning while the other Linleys were out and found her unconscious from drugs she had taken. Shortly after Elizabeth recovered from the overdose, the trio of friends conspired to put their plans into action; Elizabeth was to feign illness on the morning of 18 March so she would be left alone in the house as a concert was scheduled for that day. (Note: According to Mikhail no concerts were scheduled for that day and it was more likely to be rehearsals for oratorios organised to take place during Lent.)

== Flight to France ==
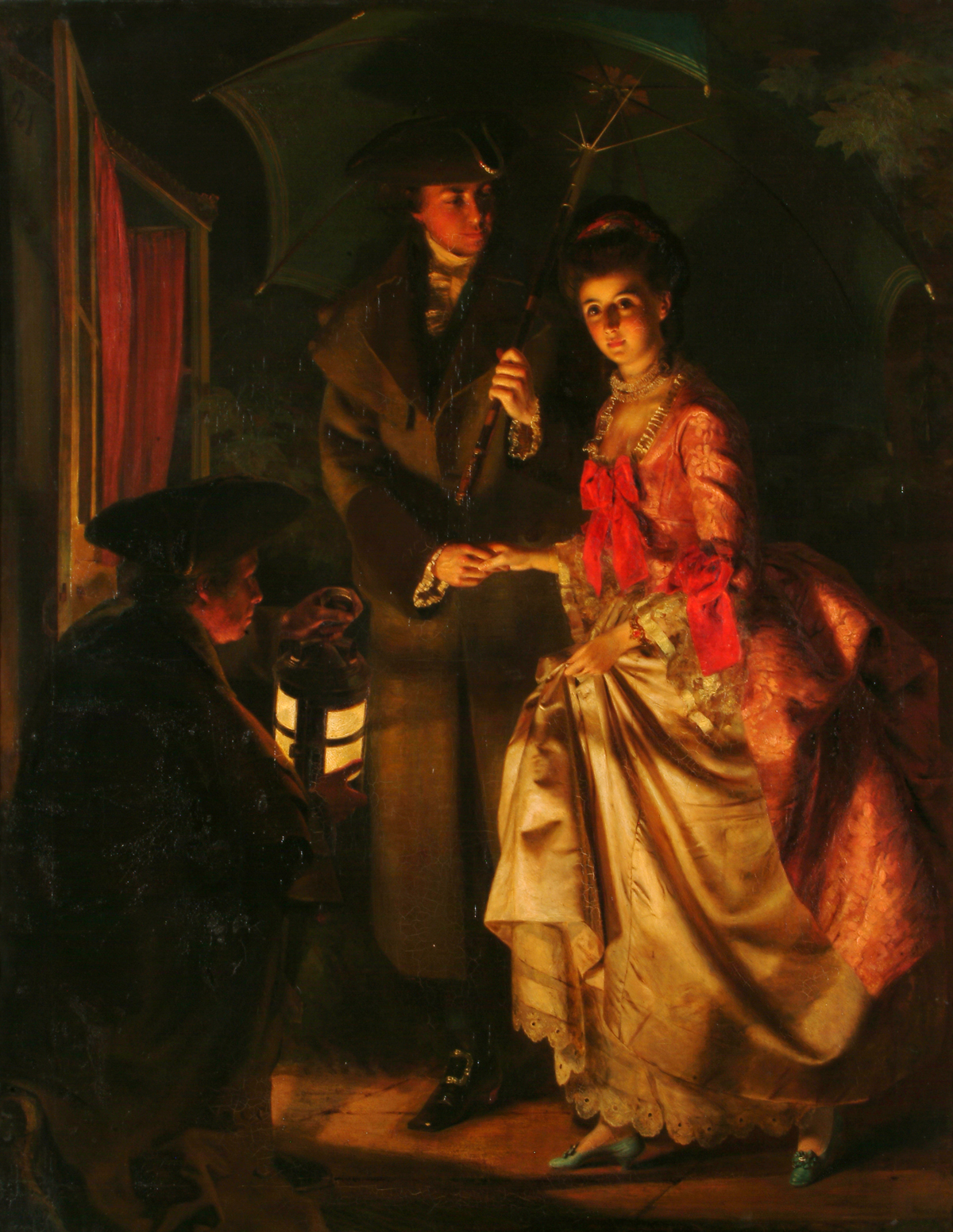
Jerry Barrett's 1860 portrayal of Sheridan helping Elizabeth escape from her father's house.

As arranged, Elizabeth refused to get out of bed on 18 March claiming she had a headache and was too ill to perform. Later, once all the members of the family had left the house, Alicia arrived and helped her gather her belongings, staying with her until Sheridan came to collect Elizabeth. Accompanied by a female servant acting as chaperone, the young couple left for France and a marriage ceremony may have taken place there that month, although no record of it exists. (Note: They were still legally minors at that time; a Catholic service would also not have been recognised under English law.) The exact details of the couple's route and events surrounding their escape vary, having been embellished and differing versions given. They first travelled to London, at which point they parted from the chaperone, arriving during the late afternoon the next day, where they approached some of Sheridan's friends for money to supplement the small amount they had in their possession; Alicia had given them a modest sum and Elizabeth had around £40 of savings. The couple were unsuccessful in acquiring extra funds, but an oil merchant, who was an acquaintance of Sheridan, helped them to get passage on a small ship destined for Dunkirk.

After a rough crossing they boarded a coach to Calais, where they stayed in an inn for at least one night using two rooms before taking another coach to Lille. The intention was to continue on to a convent in St Quentin, but Elizabeth had been ill since the sea crossing and her condition deteriorated while they were in Lille. Treated by a local English doctor and nursed by his wife in their home, Elizabeth began to recover, but he recognised the early symptoms of tuberculosis. Sheridan remained with her, writing letters to friends in England, while they had lengthy discussions about their childhoods, politics and ambitions. Elizabeth realised her feelings for him had deepened and, despite his lack of money and social connections, she wanted to devote her life to helping and supporting him.

Meanwhile, back in Bath, Thomas Linley had been devastated when he discovered his daughter was missing, sending search parties out to look for her; he soon learned she had absconded with Sheridan. Despite his attempts to save her reputation by quelling the information, it quickly became the topic of gossip and rumour throughout Bath. Linley received a letter from Sheridan detailing Mathews' behaviour towards Elizabeth and her father may have delayed seeking her return until after Mathews had left Bath. As the circumstances of Mathews' part in the events became widely known, he lost any support he had; he placed an advertisement in the Bath Chronicle, published on 9 April 1772, decrying Sheridan, then left the town a few days later.

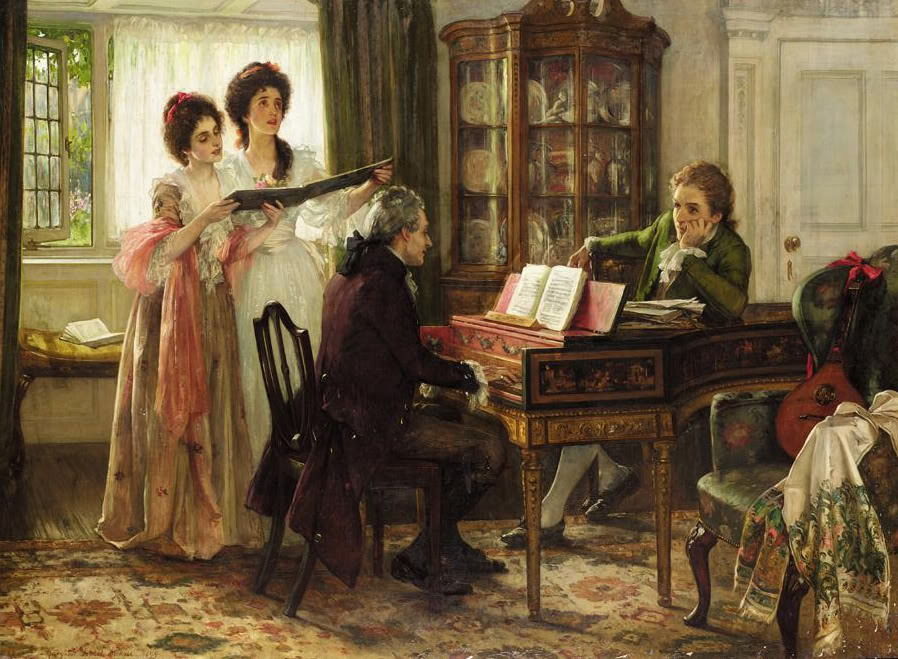
Margaret Dicksee, Sheridan at the Linleys, 1899.

The young couple stayed in France for around a month, returning on or around 29 April 1772, after her father had learned where they were and visited them. Keen to get Elizabeth back home because he had her scheduled to undertake several concert engagements, and finally aware of the harassment she had endured from Mathews, Linley conceded to a number of her demands. She insisted her workload be reduced, that she be given the option to only perform when she chose to and that she had the freedom to go back to France once she fulfilled the work he had already contracted for her. To break the journey back to Bath, the trio stayed overnight in London; Sheridan surreptitiously left to find and confront Mathews, who he discovered was in London. When he found him in his lodgings, Mathews lied to Sheridan about the contents of the advertisement he had placed in the Bath Chronicle, convincing him it had not been defamatory.

As soon as the Linleys and Sheridan arrived back in Bath, Sheridan went to the newspaper office to check exactly what had been contained in the advertisement; after learning the true content, arrangements were made with his brother to return to London and again challenge Mathews. A brief duel to defend Elizabeth's honour took place on the evening of 4 May 1772 between Sheridan and Mathews in London where they agreed to fight in Hyde Park, but finding it too crowded they went first to the Hercules Pillars tavern and then on to the Castle Tavern in Henrietta Street, Covent Garden. Mathews lost his sword and begged for his life before signing a formal retraction of the advertisement he had placed. The apology was made public and Mathews, infuriated by the publicity the duel had received, and goaded into action by his friend William Barnett, refused to accept his defeat as final and challenged Sheridan to another duel. Sheridan was not obliged to accept this challenge, but would have become a social pariah if he had not. The second duel, fought in July 1772 at Kingsdown near Bath, was a much more ferocious affair. This time both men broke their swords but carried on fighting in a "desperate struggle for life and honour". Both were wounded, Sheridan dangerously. Elizabeth was performing in Oxford and Cambridge so was unaware of the events until later. Although Sheridan's injuries were severe, eight days after the duel the Bath Chronicle was able to announce that he was out of danger.

The duels were the impetus for Thomas Linley and Thomas Sheridan deciding that the young couple must be kept apart; Elizabeth was kept in Bath, overworked but otherwise confined to the house, and on 28 August Richard was sent to Waltham Abbey in Essex with the intention he would go on to study law at Middle Temple. Once separated and forbidden by their fathers from contacting each other, their ardour began to wane. Linley encouraged other wealthy suitors to court Elizabeth; Sir Thomas Clarges proposed to her but she refused him around early December 1772. Thomas Norris also asked her to marry him but she rejected him. Sheridan did not remain chaste and had affairs but when he discovered Elizabeth was due to perform at Drury Lane, just a few miles from where he was, in February 1773, the romance was revived. Details of the exact events and circumstances that transpired at the beginning of April 1773 are sketchy but Sheridan, who had turned twenty-one on 30 October 1772 so legally no longer a minor, convinced Elizabeth's father to allow them to wed. Sheridan's father was in Ireland and was not informed or invited.

== Marriage ==
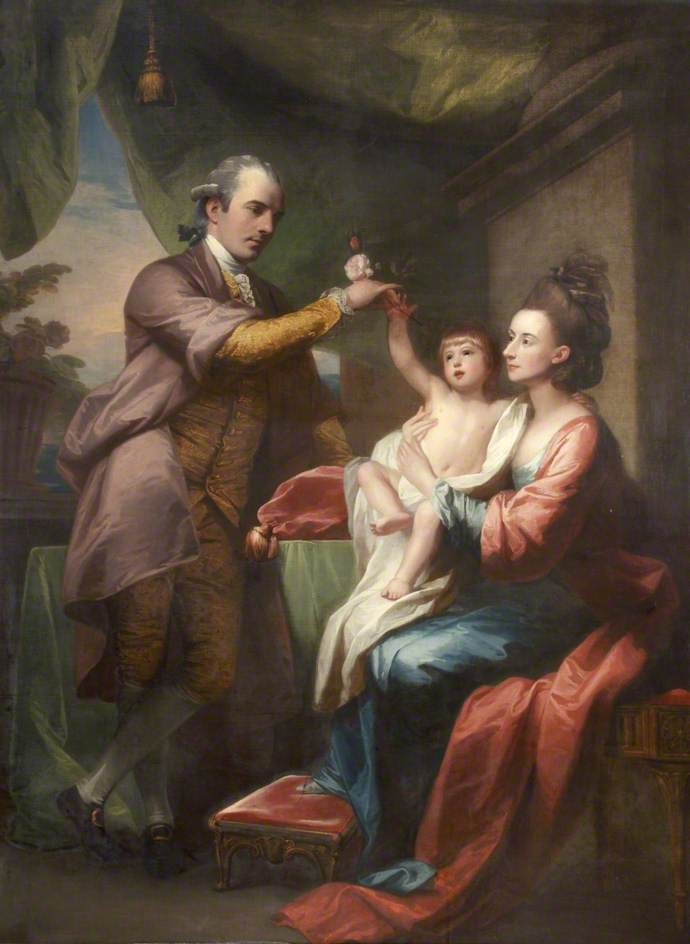
The Sheridan Family. Elizabeth and Sheridan with their son, Tom, painted by Benjamin West c. 1776 although Kalinsky considers it would be around 1778 as Tom seems to be approximately three years old; she also feels it is a poor depiction of Elizabeth but qualifies this by stating West typically was not successful at reproducing women's portraits.

Sheridan and Elizabeth were officially married at St Marylebone Parish Church on 13 April 1773, the period when Elizabeth was described by Frances Burney as "infinitely superior to all other English singers." According to later newspaper reports their courtship was "one of the classic romances of the west country" and she was "the most beautiful singer in England". Sheridan came from a family that was almost destitute; like his father, Thomas, (Note: Thomas Sheridan was constantly in debt. He was the son of Dr Thomas Sheridan and Elizabeth MacFadden; the couple were poor managers of their financial affairs and usually in debt.) he was poverty-stricken yet after they were officially married Sheridan would not allow her to appear on stage in a professional capacity as he felt it reflected badly on his status as a gentleman. Elizabeth was concerned about their precarious financial status, as their income was negligible, imploring her husband to allow her to continue singing as it was their only means of securing funds. Part of Elizabeth's £1,000 dowry, which her father had taken out of the compensation received from Long, was used to purchase a house in London; a further £1,050 of the Long money was held in trust providing Elizabeth with just £31 and ten shillings a year in interest during her lifetime. Eventually Sheridan reluctantly permitted Elizabeth to perform at the Three Choirs Festival held in Worcester during September 1773. The contract to perform, negotiated by Elizabeth's father, was lucrative but Sheridan insisted that she donate the one hundred guinea fee to charity, a gesture in accordance with his yearning to be considered a member of the gentry. Throughout their marriage, Sheridan borrowed heavily to sustain their extravagant lifestyle.

Summer months were spent as invited guests in the stately homes of people such Georgiana Cavendish, Duchess of Devonshire and her husband, William Cavendish, 5th Duke of Devonshire at Chatsworth House or at the Putney home of the merchant banker Stratford Canning; time was also spent at Croome, the home of Lord Coventry. In return for transport, accommodation, food and wine, Elizabeth would sing each evening for the small select group of other dinner guests, relieving the couple of living expenses for a part of the year. During the months that they were at home, Elizabeth's husband organised private twice-weekly soirées there for aristocrats to hear her sing, sometimes accompanied by her sister, Mary; although he had declared she would never perform again in public, he charged attendees.

The invitations to enjoy the hospitality at the homes of the nobility were extended to Elizabeth as they were keen to hear her sing but they considered her husband a nonentity. Elizabeth derived great pleasure from the visits, soon striking up close lasting friendships with several of the hostesses; she was especially pleased that Sheridan, despite his reputation, began to be accepted and his wit drew admiring comments at the dinner table. Historian Joseph Roach describes them as the "pre-eminent glamour couple of the 1770s and 1780s".

Elizabeth and the Duchess of Devonshire became good friends despite the differences in their social status. Devonshire House, Georgiana's London home, was the hub for social entertaining and Whig party politics, providing the Sheridans with an introduction to Charles James Fox and other influential politicians like Edmund Burke. By early 1780 Sheridan's career aspirations turned towards politics and Elizabeth gave him her full support. When Fox was fighting to win his Westminster seat in 1784, Elizabeth was very active with Georgiana and her sister campaigning in the streets for him. The event was surrounded by scandal: Thomas Rowlandson produced a caricature of Georgiana kissing meat sellers to secure their votes; gossip and negative publicity was rife, yet Elizabeth's reputation was not tarnished. She was not included in the pamphlets, and the opposition supporters who quipped so cruelly about aristocratic ladies only alluded to Elizabeth's sweetness being irresistible.

As her husband's political career became more successful, Elizabeth's involvement with the Whigs deepened; Sheridan was a favourite of the Prince of Wales, who frequently dined with them. The preparation and editing of Sheridan's speeches was carried out by Elizabeth, and during the period of the regency crisis in 1788, it was Elizabeth who undertook much of the work in drafting and revising the reply presented to William Pitt by the Prince.

The Sheridans had a tempestuous marriage, as they were an ill-matched couple; Sheridan preferred city life in contrast to Elizabeth's love of the countryside. After several miscarriages and a stillborn baby on 6 May 1777, the couple had a son, Thomas (Tom), who was born in mid-November 1775. (Note: A. Norman Jeffares gives the date of birth as 17 November 1775 whereas Black gives 16 November 1775.) Sheridan had several affairs, as did Elizabeth, and they spent a great deal of time apart. By the time she was 36, in 1790, Elizabeth was showing signs of ill-health but had to maintain the appearance of an involvement with London society. While visiting Devonshire House Elizabeth met Lord Edward FitzGerald, and they became lovers. She conceived a child by him, a baby girl who was born on 30 March 1792. The trauma of childbirth exacerbated Elizabeth's illness and she died of tuberculosis on 28 June 1792. Elizabeth was buried at Wells Cathedral on 7 July 1792.

== Poetry and writing ==
Apart from her singing skills, Elizabeth possessed several other artistic talents, including sketching, mimicry and the ability to play musical instruments. She was also an adept writer and poet, particularly using verse as an aid and means of communication in times of mourning. When her younger brother Tom died after falling from a boat into a lake at Grimsthorpe on 5 August 1778 Elizabeth penned a widely circulated verse to his lyre that received a published response from a local poet. Her elegy, entitled On her Brother's Violin, was later reproduced in the 1785 edition of The Annual Register. She also wrote an ode concerning the death from tuberculosis of her sister Mary on 27 July 1787. Letters between Elizabeth and Sheridan took the form of verse both before and during their marriage. David Garrick also corresponded with her, affectionately referring to her as The Saint; historian Giles Waterfield quotes Garrick as asking: "What is my thought like? Why is Mrs Sheridan like a cat?"

Shortly after their marriage, Sheridan abandoned his anticipated career in law, attempting instead to gain income from freelance journalism. Already aware of Elizabeth's literary prowess, he cajoled her into helping write press items, claiming her writing skills were superior to her singing. (Note: The thirty-six line verse written by Sheridan is titled On his wife ceasing to sing; reproduced in volume 2 of Walter Sichel's biography of Sheridan, the relevant section reads: "Hear but her voice! amaz'd you'd swear/ The soul of Music centres there!/ Read but her verse, and You'll confess/ Her song did raise your wonder less/") Her abilities were also called upon after Sheridan bought shares in the Theatre Royal, Drury Lane; she undertook the administration, book-keeping and secretarial work associated with the running of a theatre. She advised her husband which singers should be used at music events, then, when he was unable to cope with the volume of manuscripts received, Elizabeth took on the role of reading all the submitted scripts before making her recommendations of the actions Sheridan should make. Elizabeth chose the music to be played at the King's Theatre after her husband became involved in that enterprise.

Letters written by Sheridan indicate Elizabeth participated in the development of the music for The Duenna, and his biographers credit her with being involved in the writing of several of his plays. In his 1825 book, Memoirs, Thomas Moore adds that according to Elizabeth's sister the epilogue to The Rivals was possibly penned by her. (Waterfield describes this biography by saying "some of his most vital pages refer to Mrs Sheridan"). He also included that "an entertainment called the Haunted Village" was written by Elizabeth. Michael Kelly claimed in his book Reminiscences that the adaptation of Richard Coeur de Lion was her work. In a letter to her sister-in-law, Alicia, dated 9 December 1782, Elizabeth revealed that she had started work on a book that was progressing well, although no further records or detail of it exist.

Three decades after her death, The Gentleman's Magazine published a letter in 1825 (volume 95) that it claimed was written by Elizabeth, addressed to a close friend called "Miss Saunders". Released just after the publication of Thomas Moore's biography Memoirs of the Life of Richard Brinsley Sheridan, it bore a resemblance to the tale of Clarissa written by Samuel Richardson, and lengthily described incidents that supposedly took place in Elizabeth's life concerning Long, Mathews and Sheridan more than fifty years previously. According to the magazine, it had received the letter "By the kindness of a valued literary friend". Waterfield explains that despite lacking any of the character, flair and style shown in Elizabeth's authentic letters, several later commentators accepted it as genuine; he describes it as "pure invention, containing a number of striking errors of fact." Caroline Norton, Elizabeth's granddaughter, discredited it in 1861, and Moore conceded it was not legitimate in the fifth edition of the Memoirs published in 1827. A series of fabricated correspondence appeared in the Bath Chronicle during 1773 purportedly between a "Lord Grosvenor" and Elizabeth; other newspapers also carried similar fake letters around that time.

== Portraiture ==
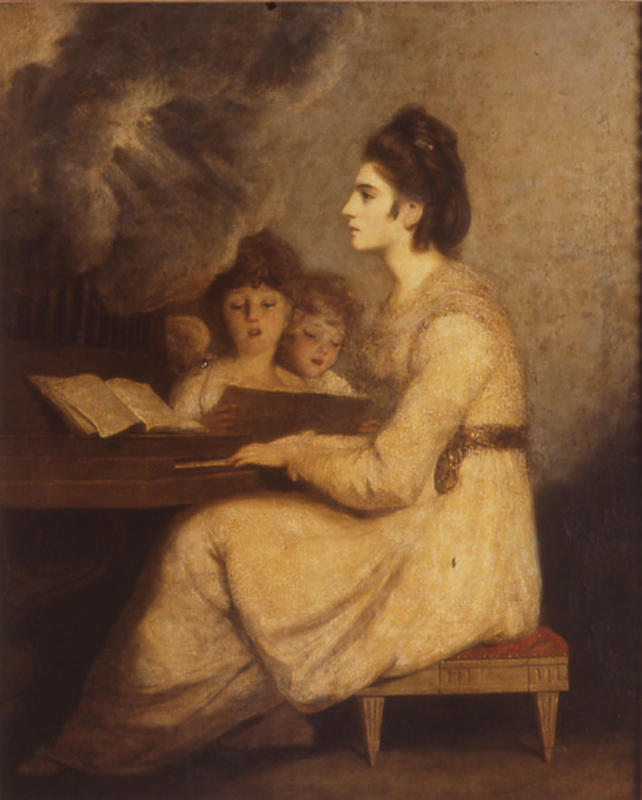
Mrs Sheridan in the character of St Cecilia, Sir Joshua Reynolds, 1775, Waddesdon Manor

By the time Elizabeth was a teenager, she had developed a reputation not only for her singing ability, but for her beauty. Thomas Gainsborough had been a friend of the family since 1759 and he painted several portraits of the Linley family. His artwork The Linley Sisters was painted c. 1772 and shows Elizabeth and her sister Mary Linley shortly before the elopement. The only known portrait of the two sisters together, in 1772 it was exhibited at the Royal Academy as A Portrait of Two Ladies. Gainsborough developed an affinity with Elizabeth, intuitively sensing her subconscious thoughts. His later portrait of her, entitled Mrs. Richard Brinsley Sheridan, was undertaken after her marriage, and has the 31-year-old Elizabeth posed on a rock set on a hillside, reflecting the rural lifestyle she begged her husband to let her lead. Masque of Beauty, a 1972 National Portrait Gallery exhibition, included Gainsborough's 1772 portrait, and paintings of Elizabeth were also exhibited as part of the gallery's 2008 exhibition entitled Brilliant women: 18th century bluestockings; William Etty's 1846 painting of her granddaughter Caroline Norton also featured in the two exhibitions, and they were the only two women to be included in both.

Elizabeth was also the model for the Joshua Reynolds painting St Cecilia, which was successfully exhibited at the Royal Academy in 1775 (now Waddesdon Manor), and described by Reynolds as "the best picture I ever painted." Reynolds had also become a friend of the Sheridans, despite earlier friction after he invited the couple to a large dinner party he was hosting. He anticipated Elizabeth would sing for his guests and purchased a new piano to be used; he was appalled when they refused on the basis she would never "sing again in public company." She was the sitter for the Virgin Mary in his painting of the nativity scene that was burnt in the fire at Belvoir Castle in 1816. (Note: In a further Reynolds portrait, held by Glasgow Museums, and the subject of edition in the fifth series of Britain's Lost Masterpieces, the sitter was given a more likely identity of Anne, Duchess of Cumberland and Strathear in 2022.)

Richard Samuel included a portrait of Elizabeth in his group painting Portraits in the Characters of the Muses in the Temple of Apollo (1778), which depicted the founders and some participants in the Blue Stockings Society. First exhibited at the Royal Academy of Arts in 1789, it is now in the National Portrait Gallery in London.

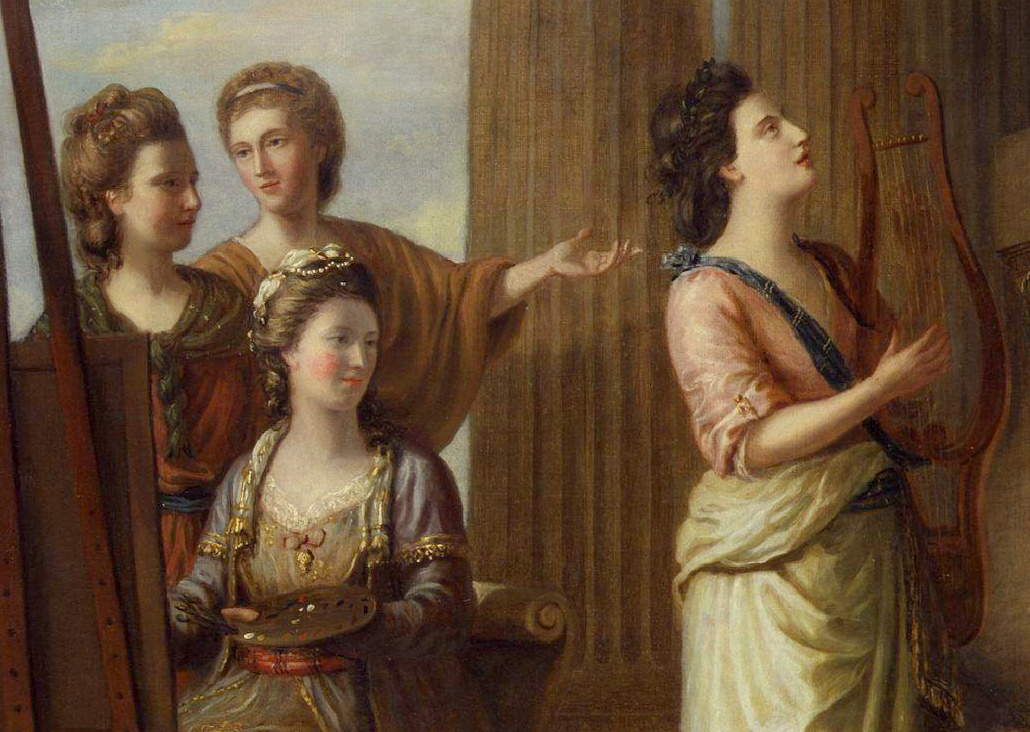
Linley (right, with lyre), in the company of other "Bluestockings" (1778, detail)

The popular title of the piece, The Nine Living Muses of Great Britain, referenced the artists and literary figures depicted: the poet Anna Laetitia Barbauld; scholar Elizabeth Carter; playwright Elizabeth Griffith; historian Catharine Macaulay; the three writers Elizabeth Montagu– who was known as the "Queen of the blue stockings" and played a significant role in the society– Hannah More and Charlotte Lennox; and Elizabeth, posing as classical muses. He styled Elizabeth in the role of Terpsichore or Erato; she is placed in a solitary but focal point towards the centre of the painting and, according to Roach, the composition is indicative of her "special place in the company of the bluestocking circle". Although the other women declared themselves as bluestockings, Elizabeth was not identified as a member.

In 1860 Jerry Barrett exhibited a pair of paintings at the Royal Academy that portrayed Elizabeth and Sheridan in two moments of their romance. One of the paintings, entitled The Elopement, captures the night of their abscondment; the scene is set at the Linley house with Elizabeth being helped from her chair by Sheridan. The other is named Sheridan, disguised as a hackney coach driver, sees Miss Linley home from Covent Garden Theatre; it was used as an illustration in The Sphere on 20 November 1940 alongside an article with the title "The Romance of Sheridan and Miss Linley". The two artworks are held at Brighton Museum & Art Gallery, but there may have been more in the series.

== Legacy ==
After her death, Sheridan fulfilled his promise to look after Elizabeth and FitzGerald's baby daughter, Mary. A nurse was employed to care for the child at his Wanstead home. The baby had a series of fits on an evening in October 1793 when she was 18 months old, dying before a doctor could attend. She was interred beside her mother at Wells Cathedral. Elizabeth's son, Thomas, had unsuccessfully tried for a political career and briefly served in the army before running off to marry Caroline Henrietta Callander of Craigforth (1779–1851), a daughter of Sir James Campbell. His father gave him a 25 per cent share of the Drury Lane Theatre in 1806, and he went on to become manager there, a role he also undertook at the Lyceum Theatre, London. Like so many of his relatives, Tom was also afflicted with tuberculosis and he moved abroad to ease the symptoms; he was appointed as the Colonial Governor's treasurer at the Cape of Good Hope in 1813. He appears to have died on 12 September 1817. (Note: Chedzoy gives September 1818, which appears to be a mis-print as newspapers report details of his body being returned to the UK in early 1818.)

In an article on Mrs Sheridan included in Rees's Cyclopædia, the music historian Charles Burney noted that: "There was a brilliancy, a spirit, and a mellifluous sweetness in the tone of her voice, which instantly penetrated the hearts of her hearers, as much as her angelic looks delighted their eyes. Her shake was perfect, her intonation truth itself, and the agility of her throat equal to any difficulty and rapidity that was pleasing." According to musicologist and music critic Stanley Sadie, Elizabeth had "one of the sweetest and most expressive soprano voices of her time."

On 4 February 1956 a plaque fixed to the outside of the former home of the Linley family at 11 Royal Crescent, Bath, was unveiled. The bronze panel was commissioned by the town Corporation with the ceremony conducted by Lady Jebb. It commemorates the elopement of Elizabeth and Sheridan; the inscription reads: "Thomas Linley lived here and from this house his daughter Elizabeth eloped with Richard Brinsley Sheridan on the evening of 18th March, 1772."
