= Ozias Thurston Linley =

English academic and organist (1765–1831)

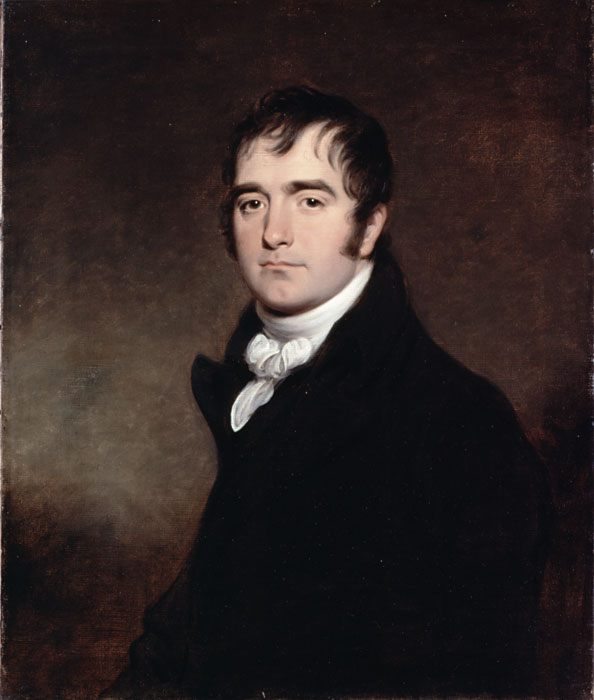
- Ozias as an adult, dressed as a canon, by Archer James Oliver
- Born: 1765
- Died: 1831 (aged 65–66)
- Education: Corpus Christi College, Oxford
- Occupations: Minor canon; organist
- Years active: 1790–1830s
- Employers: Norwich Cathedral; Dulwich College
- Father: Thomas Linley the elder

Ozias Thurston Linley (1765–1831) was one of seven musical siblings born to the composer Thomas Linley the elder and his wife Mary Johnson.

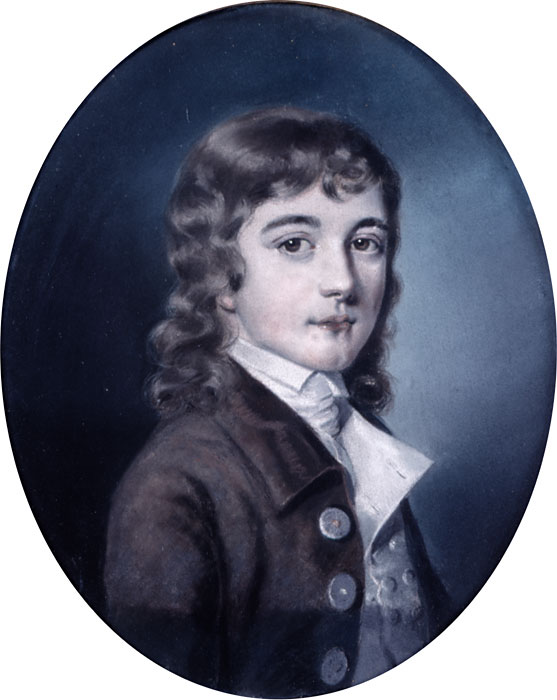
Ozias as a boy (attributed to Thomas Lawrence)

He graduated from Corpus Christi College, Oxford, in 1789, becoming a minor canon of Norwich Cathedral the following year and Junior Fellow and Organist at Dulwich College from 1816. He was noted for his eccentricity and strong language.
