= Samuel Linley =

2nd son of Thomas Linley the Elder (1760–1778)

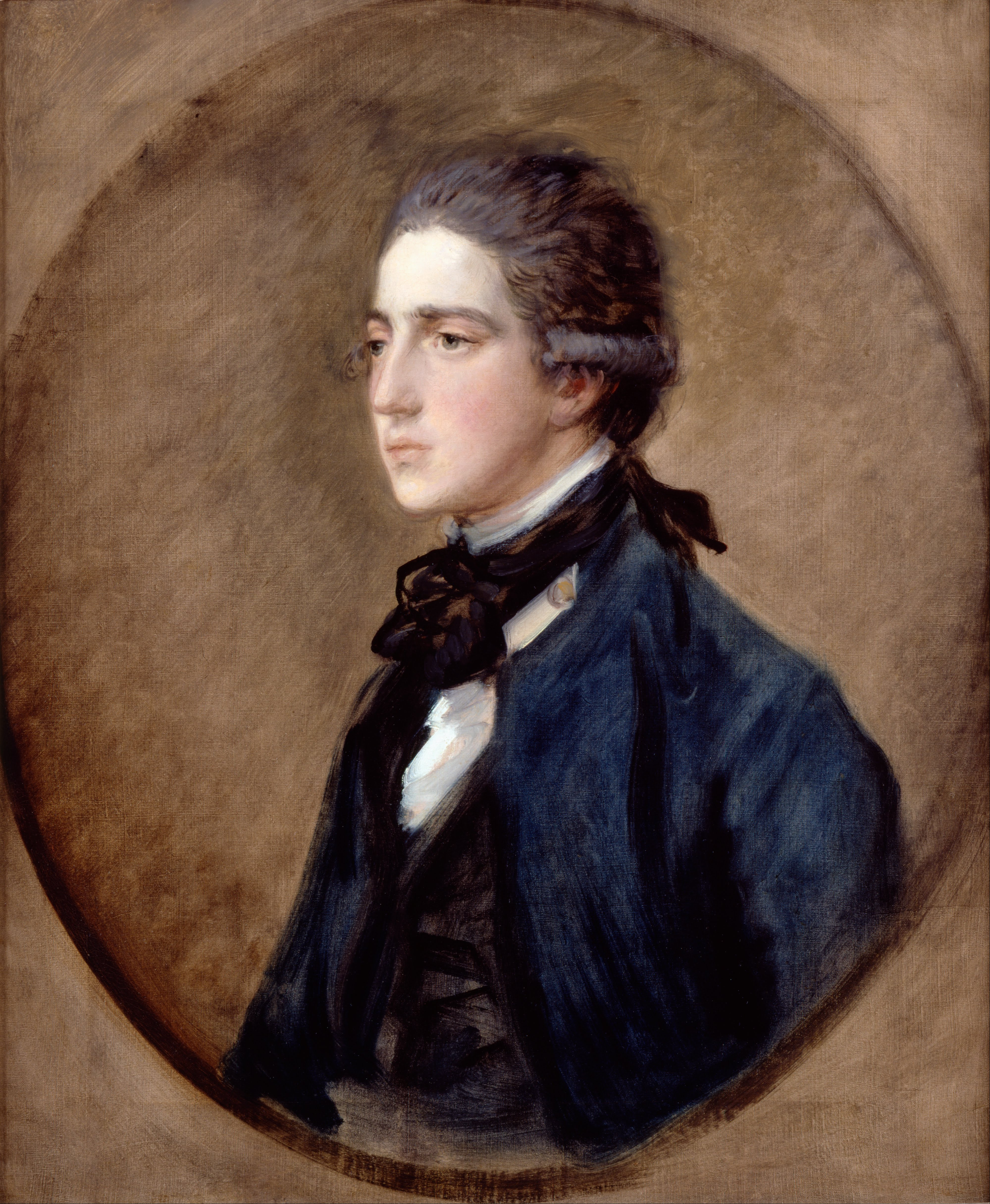
- Linley in his midshipman's uniform, by Thomas Gainsborough, who painted this image, according to family tradition, in 48 minutes flat
- Born: 1760; Bath, Somerset, England
- Died: December 1778 (aged 17–18)
- Occupations: Musician; midshipman
- Father: Thomas Linley the elder

Samuel Linley (1760 – December 1778) was the second son of Thomas Linley the elder and Mary Johnson, one of seven musical siblings born to that couple.

== Life ==
Samuel Linley was born when the family were living in Bath, Somerset, during 1760; he was baptised on 23 June that year. His first public performance was dancing the hornpipe for a production of Shakespeare's King John in Bristol when he was six years old. He sang in his father's concerts during 1774 and 1775, and played the oboe, an instrument he was probably taught to play by William Herschel. In 1778, he became a midshipman on HMS Thunderer, aboard which he contracted the fever from which he died. The register of his burial is dated 6 December 1778.

Emma Hart, who went on to be Lady Hamilton, was employed by the Linley family as a maidservant; she nursed Linley during his illness but was distraught when he died, immediately leaving the house. Henry Angelo, one of the pallbearers, recalled in his memoirs that she said "no entreaties could prevail upon her to remain, not even a day."
