= Mary Linley =

British singer (1758–1787)

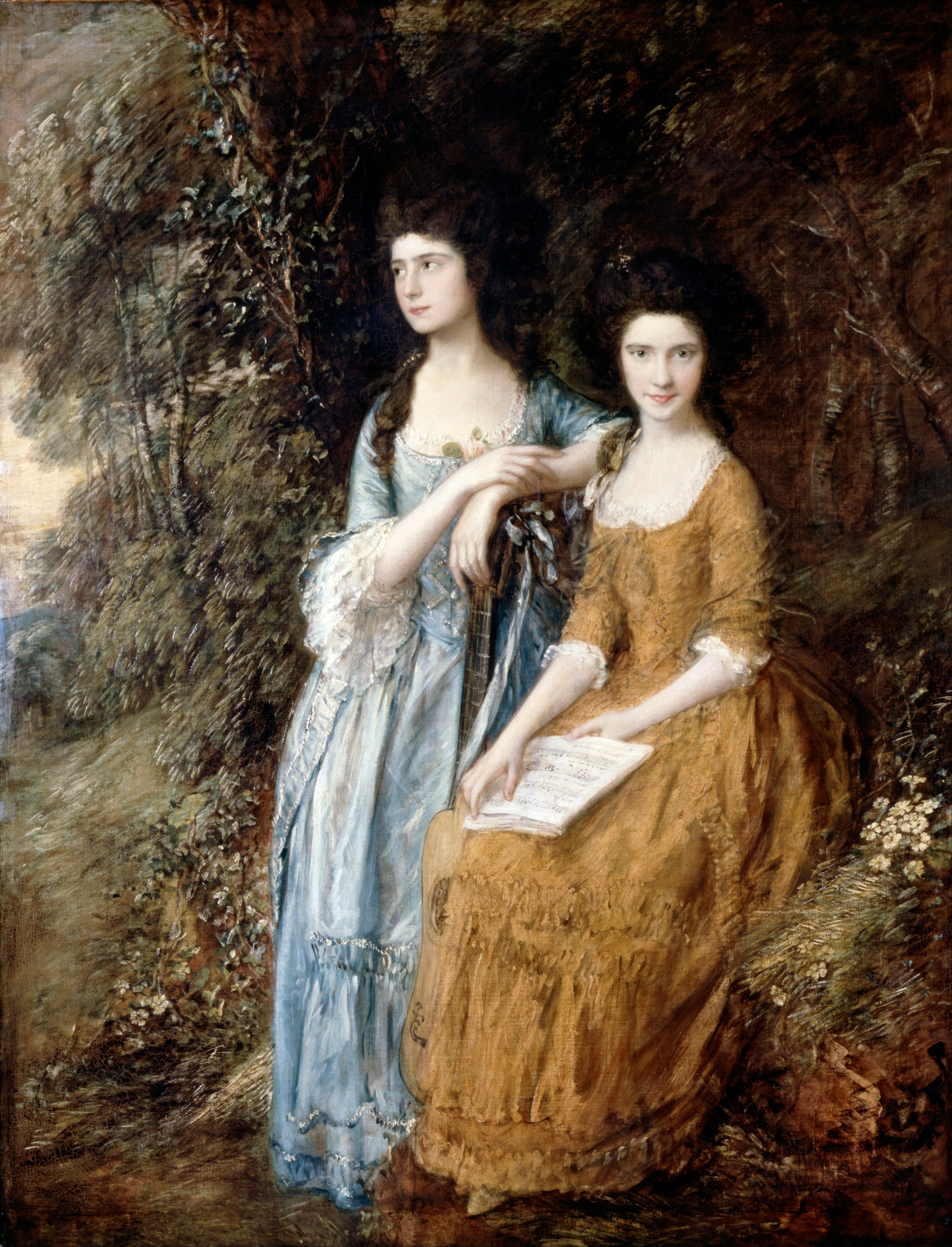
- The Linley Sisters, by Thomas Gainsborough (Dulwich Picture Gallery) - Mary (sitting, right), with her elder sister Elizabeth
- Born: 4 January 1758; Bath, England
- Died: 27 July 1787 (aged 29); Clifton
- Resting place: Wells Cathedral
- Other name: Mary Tickell
- Occupation: Singer
- Spouse: Richard Tickell (m. 1780)
- Children: 3
- Father: Thomas Linley the elder
- Relatives: Elizabeth Ann Linley (sister)

Mary Linley (4 January 1758 – 27 July 1787) was one of seven musical siblings born to Thomas Linley the elder and his wife Mary Johnson. She sang publicly until she married the playwright Richard Tickell in 1780.

== Biography ==
Linley was born in Bath, England, on 4 January 1758. In 1771, she appeared at the Three Choirs Musical Festival at Hereford, and in 1772 at Gloucester, with her sister Elizabeth Ann Linley. On Elizabeth Ann's retirement, Mary Linley filled her place in oratorio and concert rooms. On 25 July 1780, she married Richard Tickell, pamphleteer and commissioner of stamps. She died at Clifton on 27 July 1787, leaving two sons and a daughter, and was buried in Wells Cathedral.
