= Dulwich Picture Gallery =

Art gallery in London

Coordinates: 51°26′46″N 0°05′11″W

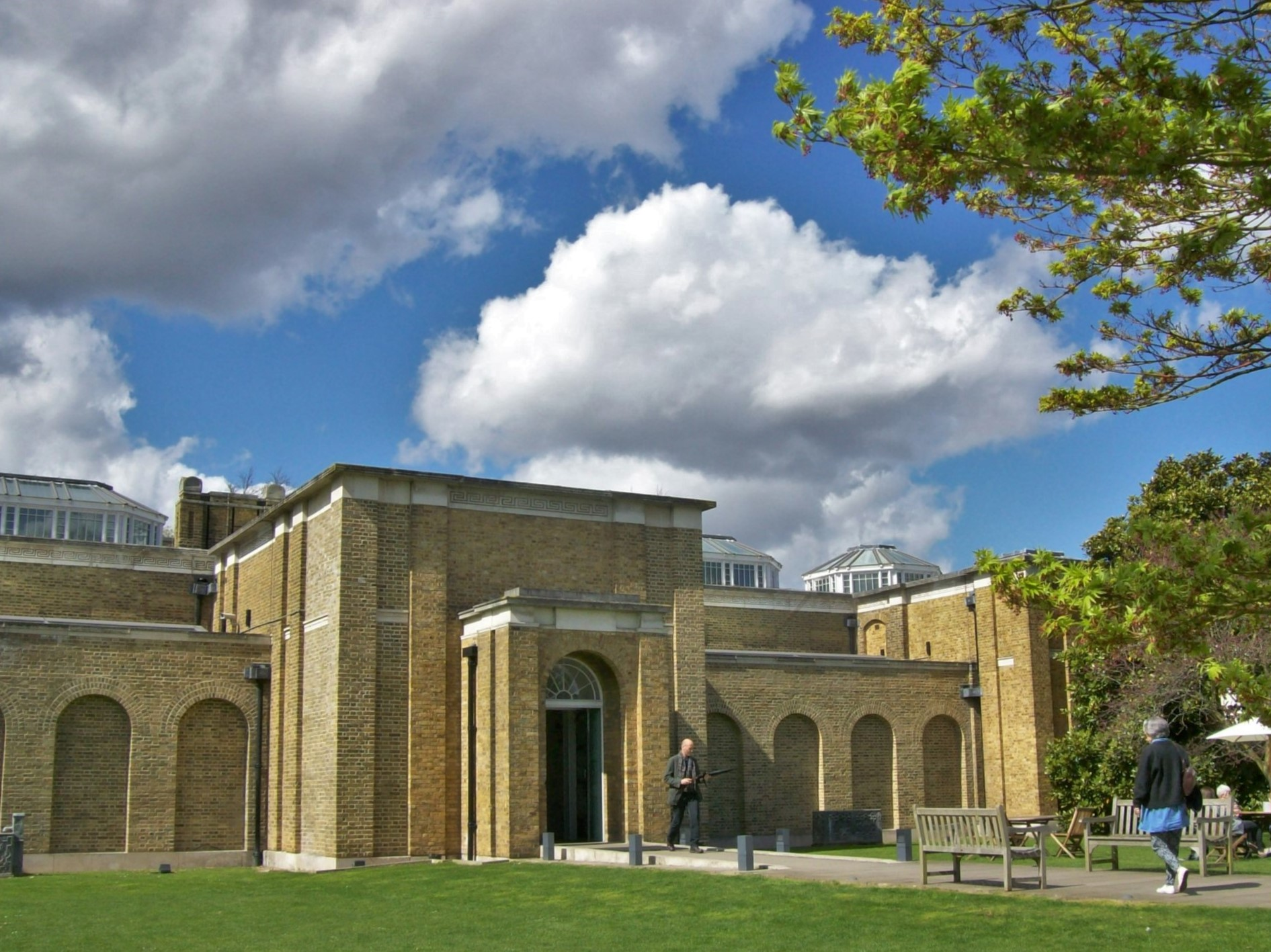

- Location within London Borough of Southwark
- Established: 1817; 209 years ago
- Location: Dulwich; London, SE21; England
- Public transit access: North Dulwich; West Dulwich
- Website: dulwichpicturegallery.org.uk

Listed Building – Grade II*
- Official name: Dulwich Picture Gallery and Mausoleum
- Designated: 30 June 1954
- Reference no.: 1385543

Dulwich Picture Gallery is an art gallery in Dulwich, south London, and the oldest public art gallery in England. Opened in 1817 to a design by Regency architect Sir John Soane, it became a landmark in museum architecture through its innovative use of natural light.

Originally part of the College of God's Gift, the charitable foundation established by Edward Alleyn in the early 17th century, the gallery became an independent charitable trust in 1994. Its collection, formed through the purchases of its founders and expanded by later bequests, ranks among Britain’s finest holdings of Old Master paintings, especially strong in French, Italian, and Spanish Baroque art and in British portraiture from the Tudor era to the 19th century.

The Dulwich Picture Gallery and its mausoleum are listed Grade II* on the National Heritage List for England. The mausoleum is for founders of the collection, Francis Bourgeois and Noël Desenfans.

== History ==
=== Early history of the gallery ===
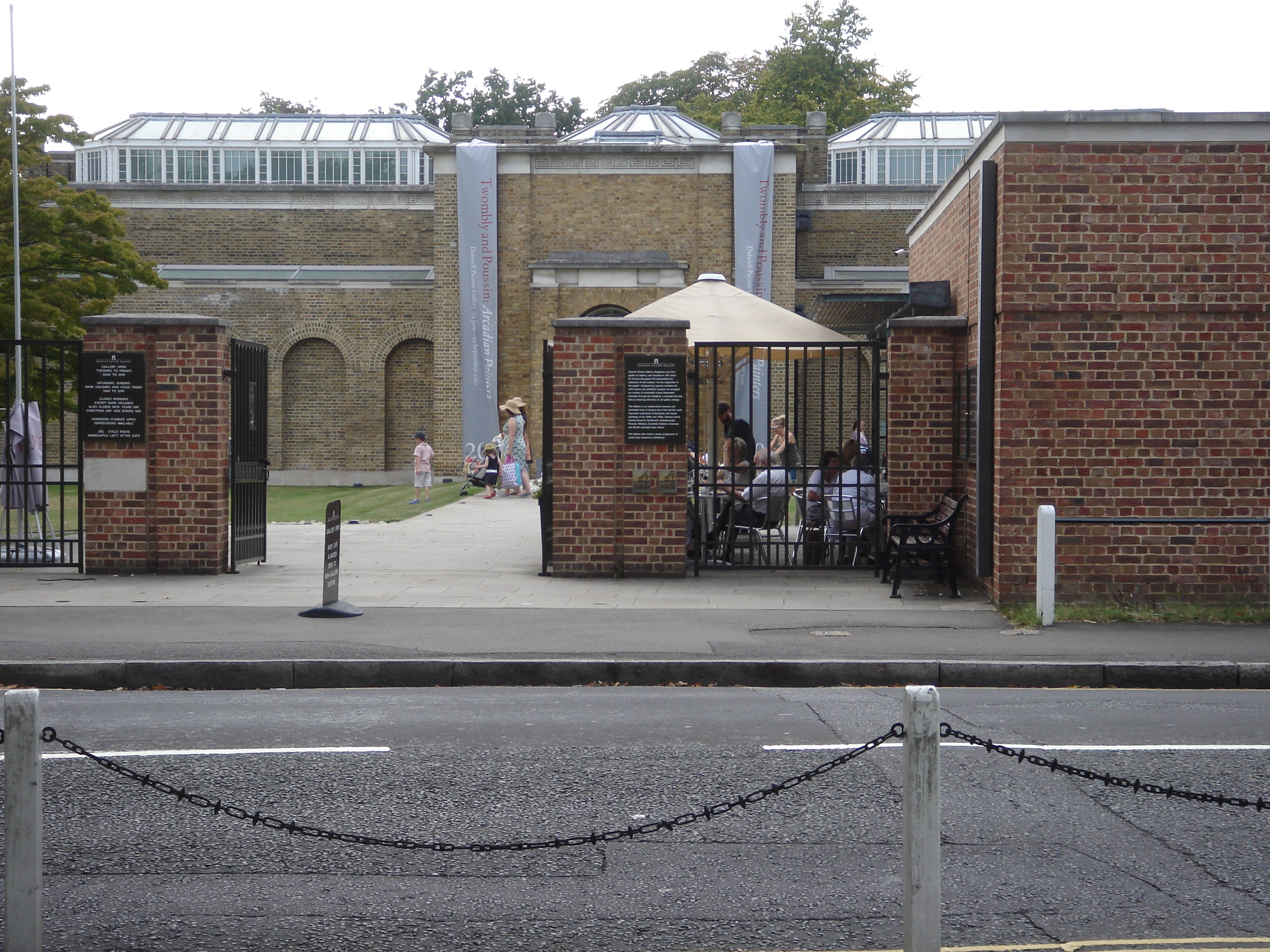
Entrance

Edward Alleyn (1566–1626) was an actor who became an entrepreneur in Elizabethan theatre. His commercial interests in the Rose and Fortune Theatres (a major competitor to the Globe Theatre), gave him sufficient wealth to acquire the Manor of Dulwich in 1605. He founded a college at Dulwich, the College of God's Gift, and endowed it with his estate. It was a school for boys and next to it were almshouses for the local poor. The college became three separate beneficiary schools—Dulwich College, Alleyn's School, and James Allen's Girls' School, named after an early 18th-century headmaster. The college, the attached almshouses and chapel survive next to the gallery on Gallery Road, although its exterior has undergone extensive renovation.

Alleyn bequeathed the college of a collection of works including portraits of the kings and queens of England. The college retained connections with the theatre and in 1686, the actor William Cartwright (1606–1686) bequeathed a collection of 239 pictures, of which 80 are now identifiable at Dulwich. In the 18th century, the collection was displayed on the first floor of the wing of the Old College. It attracted few additions during this period, and recorded descriptions of the gallery suggest disappointment and apathy from its visitors. The art historian and Whig politician Horace Walpole wrote that he saw "a hundred mouldy portraits among apostles sibyls and kings of England".

=== Later history – Bourgeois, Desenfans and Sir John Soane ===
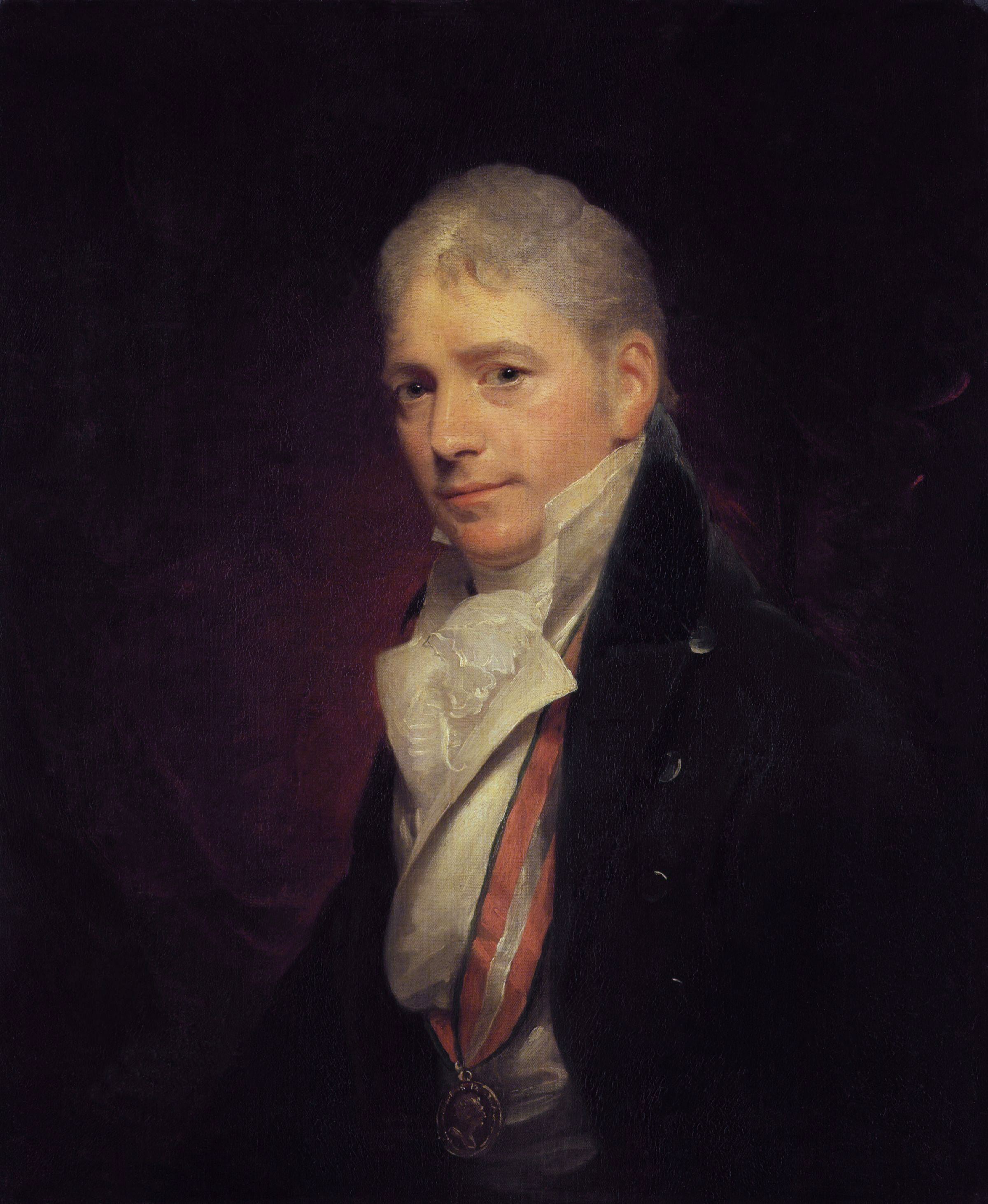
Portrait of Francis Bourgeois by William Beechey, 1810

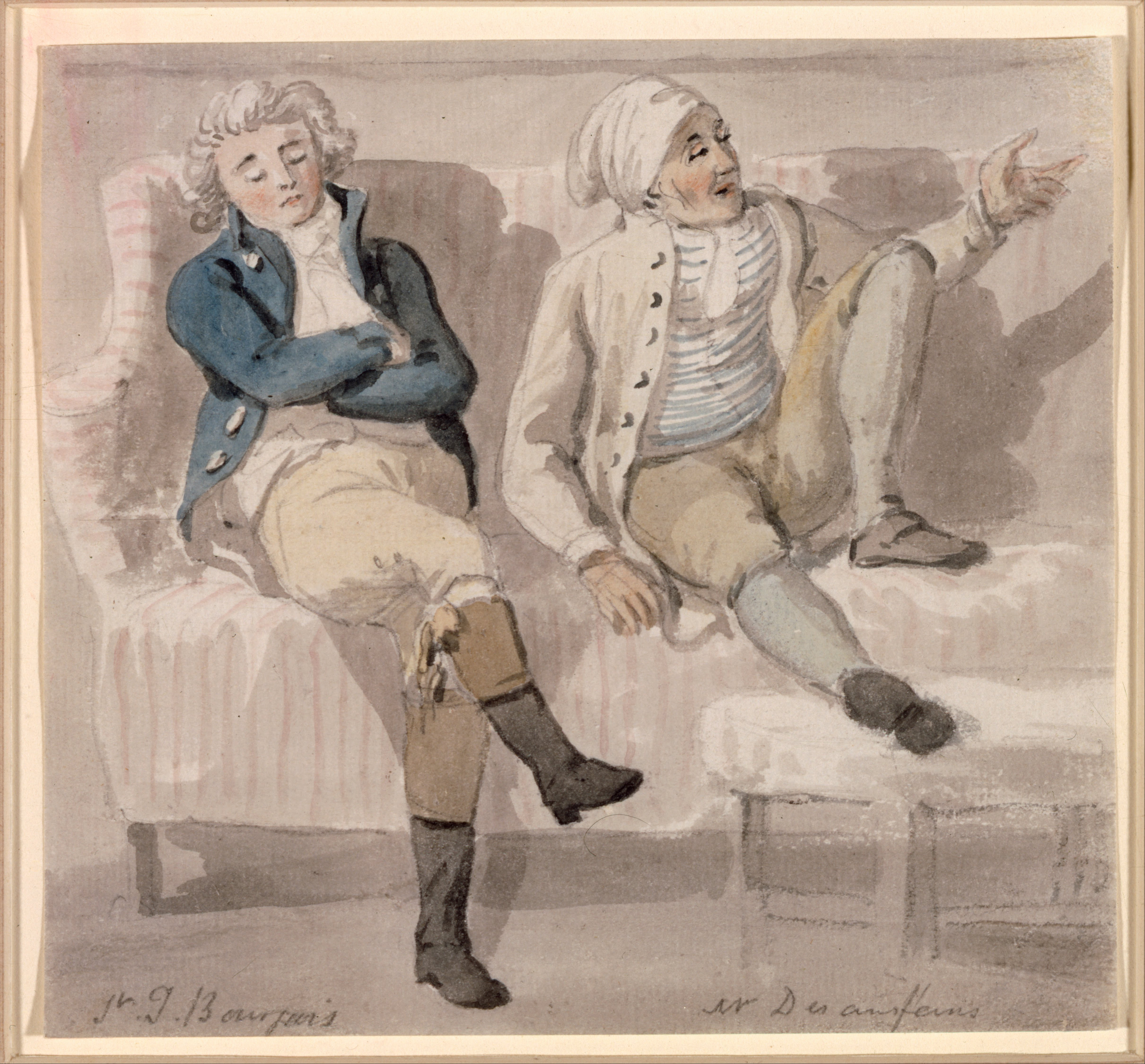
Francis Bourgeois and Noël Desenfans

The Dulwich collection was improved in size and quality by Sir Francis Bourgeois (1753–1811), originally from Switzerland, and his business partner, Frenchman Noël Desenfans (1744–1807). Their involvement saw the Gallery make significant steps towards its present state, and they are credited as founders of Dulwich Picture Gallery. They ran an art dealership in London and in 1790 were commissioned by the king of the Polish–Lithuanian Commonwealth, Stanisław August Poniatowski, to assemble a national collection for Poland to encourage fine arts in his country. Desenfans had lobbied the British Government to create a similar British national collection and offered to contribute to it, but was unenthusiastically received. Touring around Europe buying fine art, Bourgeois and Desenfans took five years to assemble the collection, but by 1795 the Polish–Lithuanian Commonwealth had been partitioned and no longer existed.

Bourgeois and Desenfans attempted to sell the collection but were unsuccessful. Instead, they sold small pieces to fund the purchase of other important works and kept the collection in Desenfans' house in Charlotte Street. After the death of Desenfans in 1807, Bourgeois inherited the collection. He commissioned Sir John Soane to design and construct a mausoleum at Desenfans' house, but was unable to secure the freehold. Bourgeois bequeathed his collection to the College of God's Gift on the advice of the actor John Philip Kemble, a friend of both dealers. Bourgeois left instructions in his will for the construction of a gallery in Dulwich, designed by Soane, in which to display the collection. It was next to the original college buildings by the chapel. He also left £2,000 for construction costs and £4,000 was contributed by Desenfans' widow.

The gallery was opened to students of the Royal Academy of Arts in 1815, two years before the official opening to the public, the delay due to a problem with the gallery's heating system. It became a popular venue for copyists from London schools of art. Its collection was frequented by many cultural figures over the next hundred years, many of whom first visited as students, including John Constable, William Etty, Joseph Mallord William Turner, and later Vincent van Gogh. Charles Dickens mentions Dulwich Picture Gallery in his novel The Pickwick Papers, as Samuel Pickwick, the novel's protagonist, is a visitor to the gallery in his retirement.

=== Modern history ===
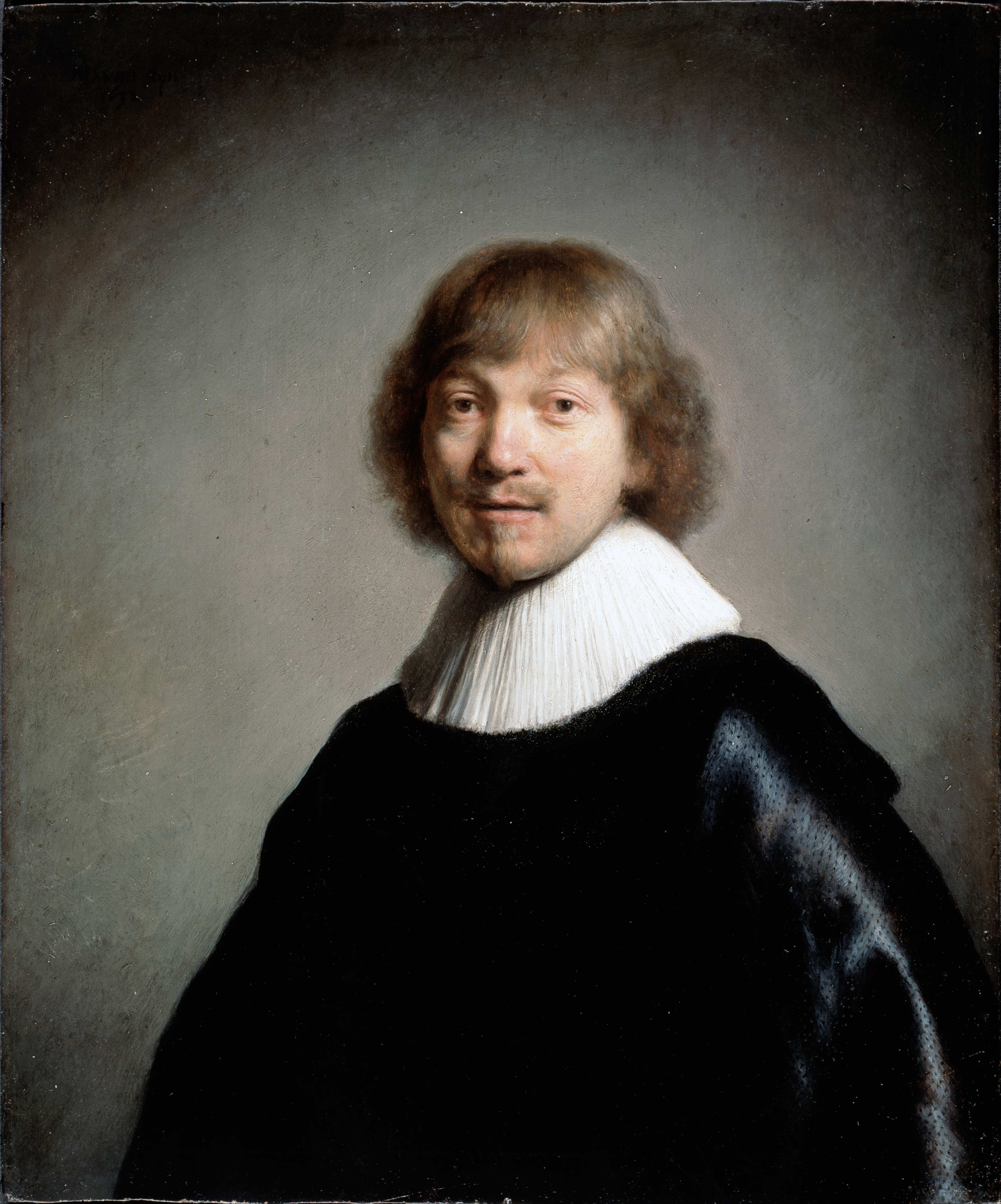
Rembrandt, Portrait of Jacob de Gheyn III

In the early hours of 31 December 1966, eight paintings were stolen, three by Rembrandt, A Girl at the Window, a version of Portrait of Titus and his Portrait of Jacob de Gheyn III, a fellow artist; three by Rubens, Three Nymphs with a Cornucopia, St. Barbara and The Three Graces; A Lady Playing on the Clavicord by Gerrit Dou; and Susannah and the Elders by Adam Elsheimer. They were worth at least £3 million but a reward of just £1,000 was offered for their return. Within a few days all the paintings were recovered after an investigation led by Detective Superintendent Charles Hewett, who had previously investigated suspected serial killer Dr John Bodkin Adams. Michael Hall, an unemployed ambulance driver, was the only one of the thieves caught and was sentenced to five years in prison.

Rembrandt's small early Portrait of Jacob de Gheyn III (1632) has been stolen and recovered four times and is listed in Guinness World Records as the most frequently stolen artwork in the world. Last stolen in 1983, it was recovered from a left-luggage office in the Federal Republic of Germany in 1986; returned anonymously; found on the back of a bicycle; and discovered under a bench in a graveyard in Streatham, south London. Since 2010, the painting has been guarded by an upgraded security system. In November 2019, During the Rembrandt's Light exhibition featuring loans of works from the Louvre in Paris and the Rijksmuseum in Amsterdam, thieves attempted to steal two of the paintings. The attempt was unsuccessful.

In 1995 a major reorganisation of the historic Alleyn's College charity resulted in the reconstitution of Dulwich Picture Gallery as an independent registered charity.

The gallery marked its bicentenary in 2017. As part of the celebrations the Gallery partnered with the London Festival of Architecture to hold a competition for emerging architects to create a 'Dulwich Pavilion', a temporary events structure to be built in the Gallery's historic grounds during the summer of 2017. The competition was won by London-based architecture practice IF_DO.

In June–September 2019, the Dulwich hosted the first major exhibition of the works of the Grosvenor School in a public art gallery outside Australia, which was critically well received.

The Gallery reopened in May 2021 after 14 months of pandemic closure with a complete rehang of the collection and the exhibition Unearthed: Photography’s Roots.

In spring 2023, the Gallery hosted the first major UK exhibition of the Impressionist Berthe Morisot since 1950.

=== Donors ===
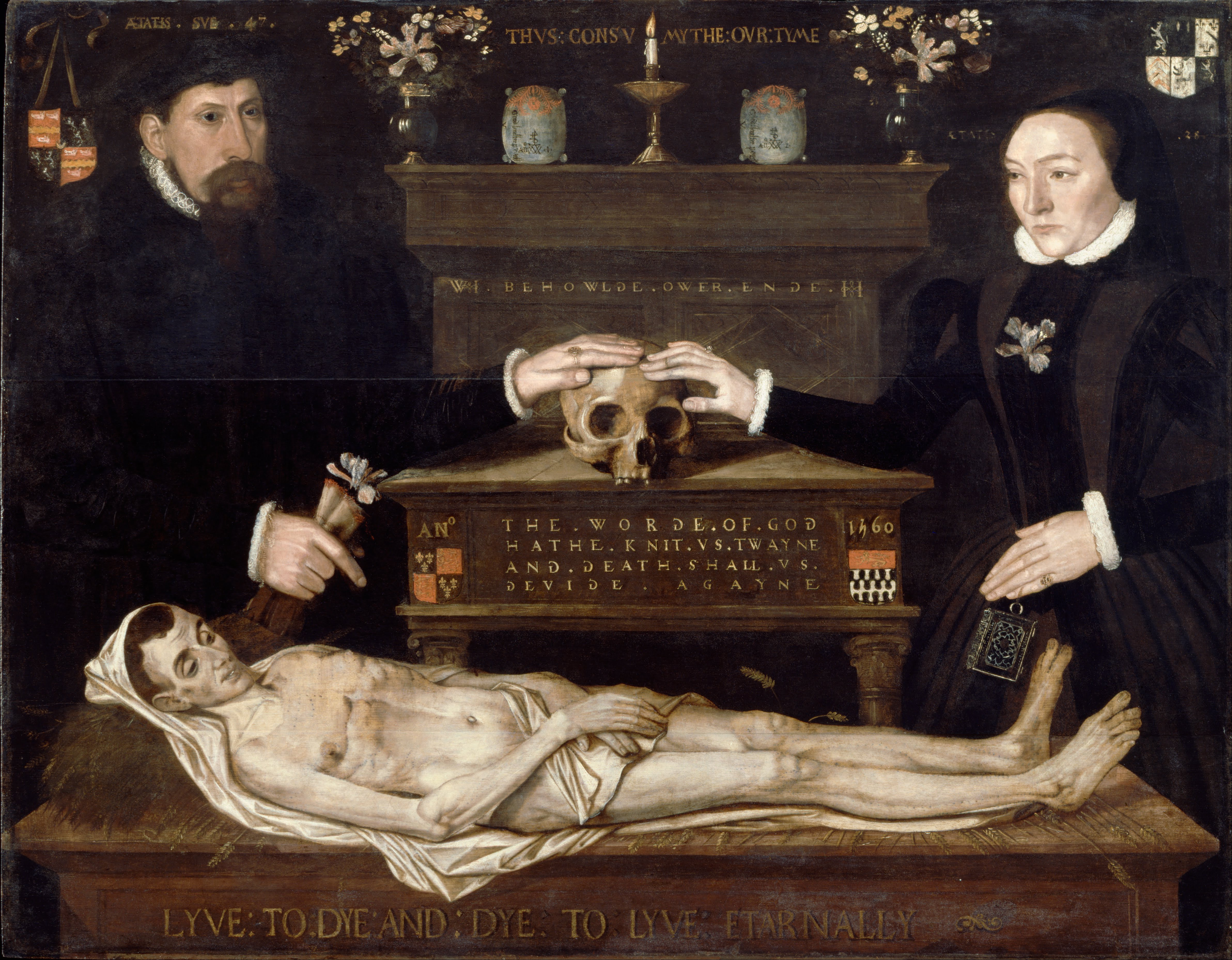
The Judde Memorial, Cartwright Bequest, 1686

The gallery attracted donors from its earliest days. In 1835 William Linley (1771–1835)—last of a musical and theatrical family (many of whom had connections to Dulwich College) and brother-in-law to playwright Richard Brinsley Sheridan—bequeathed his collection of family portraits to the gallery. Among these paintings were works by Thomas Gainsborough, Archer James Oliver, James Lonsdale and Thomas Lawrence.

The portraitist and Royal Academician William Beechey (1753–1839) donated a picture of the gallery's founder Bourgeois he had painted on the back of a picture by Joshua Reynolds in 1836 adding two images to the collection, although only one can be shown at a time. In 2012, the side of the canvas on display was by Reynolds.

British portrait art became better represented due to the benefaction of Charles Fairfax Murray, a Pre-Raphaelite painter, collector and dealer. A group of 40 pictures were donated by Murray in 1911 and others followed in 1915 and 1917–18.

== Gallery design ==
Audio description of the gallery by Christoph Vogtherr

Dulwich Picture Gallery's design and architecture comprising a series of interlinked rooms lit by natural light through overhead skylights has been the primary influence on art gallery design ever since. Soane designed the skylights to illuminate the paintings indirectly. Soane's design was unrelated to traditional architectural practice or schools of architecture. Instead of constructing a façade with the stucco porticos favoured by many contemporary architects, he opted to use uninterrupted raw brick, a feature subsequently adopted by many 20th-century art galleries. The architect Philip Johnson said of the gallery, "Soane has taught us how to display paintings".

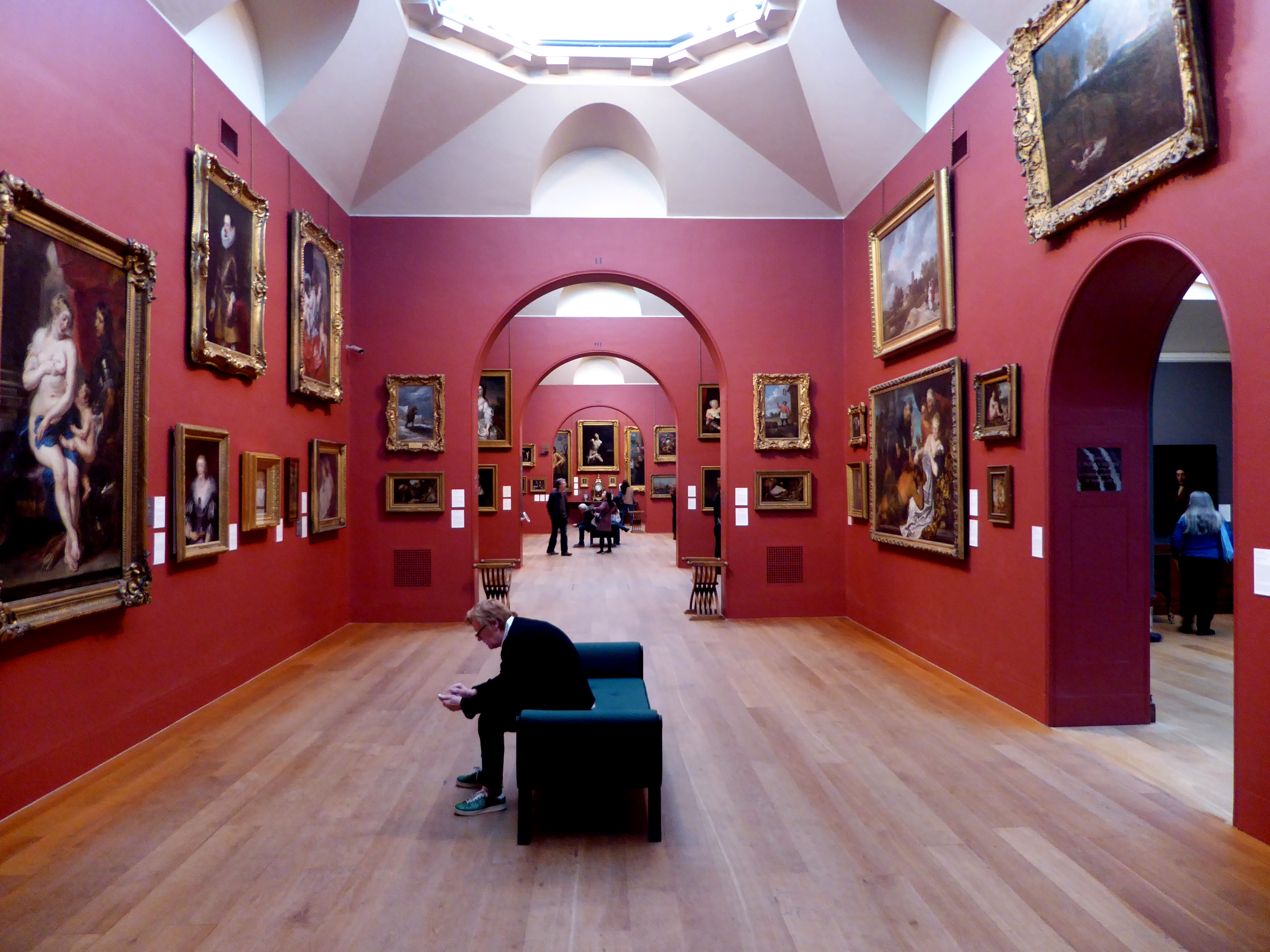
Interior of the gallery

Before Soane settled on his final design, he proposed a number of other ideas around a quadrangle belonging to the Alleyn's charitable foundation to the south of the college buildings. The schemes proved too ambitious and only the gallery was built, conceived as one wing of the quadrangle. The mausoleum was Soane's idea, as Bourgeois had merely indicated a desire to be buried in the college chapel. Soane recalled Bourgeois' desire to construct a mausoleum in Desenfans' home and his design was axiomatic to that of the Charlotte Street house. Bourgeois and Desenfans, along with Desenfans' wife, who died in 1815, are buried in the gallery's mausoleum. Alms houses constructed by Soane along the west side of the gallery were converted into exhibition space by Charles Barry Jr. in 1880 and an eastward extension was built to designs by E. S. Hall between 1908 and 1938.

On 12 July 1944, during World War II, the mausoleum and west wing galleries were badly damaged by a German V1 flying-bomb and bones were scattered across the lawn in front of the gallery. The three sarcophagi in the mausoleum now contain approximately a skeleton each. The buildings were refurbished by Austin Vernon and Partners and re-opened by the Queen Mother on 27 April 1953.

A modernist café, education rooms, disabled access and lecture theatre by Rick Mather were added in 1999. At the same time parts of Soane's original design were restored and the latest refurbishment was opened by Queen Elizabeth II on 25 May 2000.

In 2023, the gallery announced plans for a £4.9 million redevelopment designed by the architects Carmody Groarke, encompassing a new sculpture garden in the southern portion of the site and a new building for school and family activities. The building, ArtPlay Pavilion, opened in September 2025, with a soft play area inside for children, and complete with the renovation of a nearby building into a cafe.

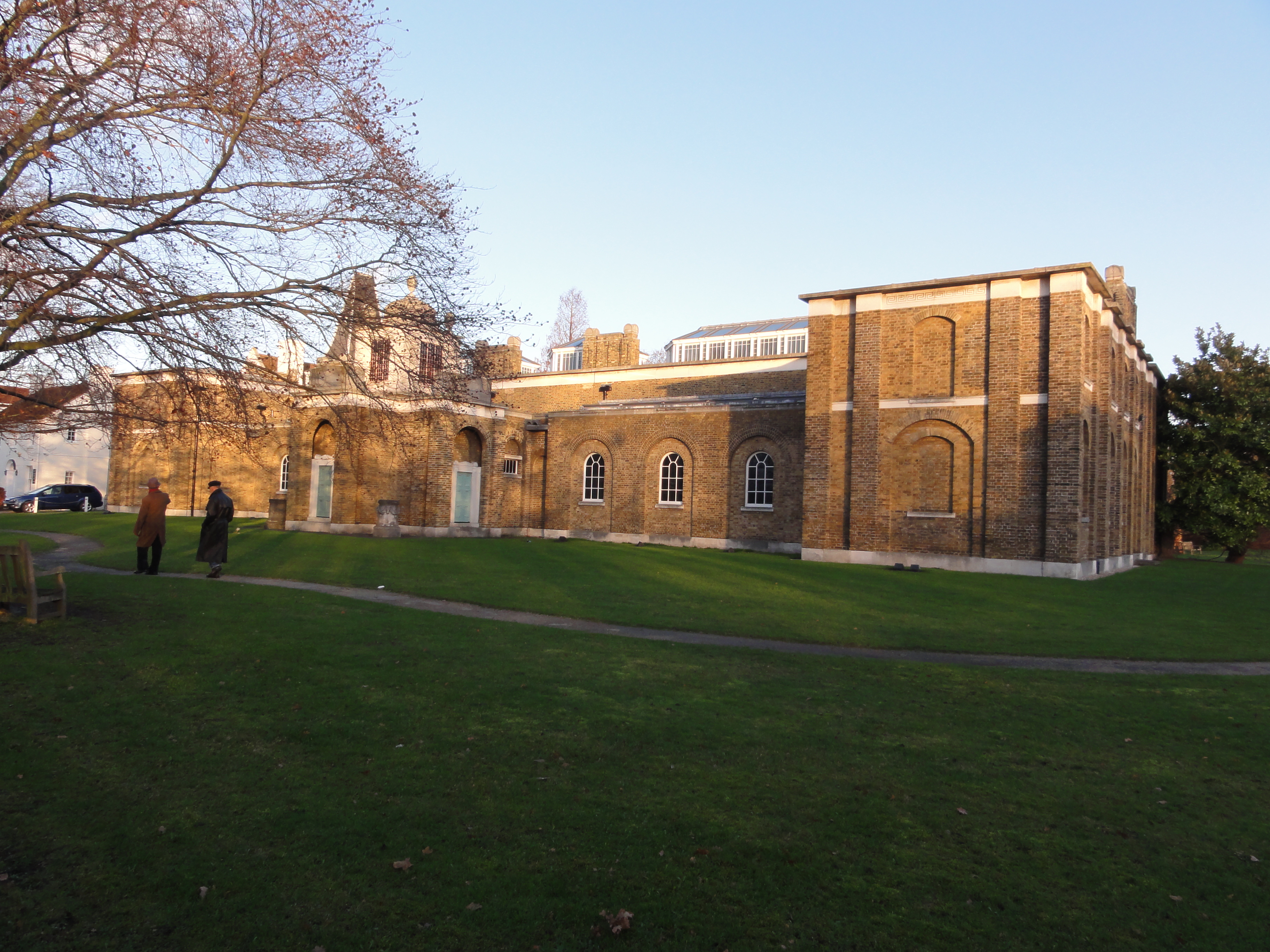
Exterior view

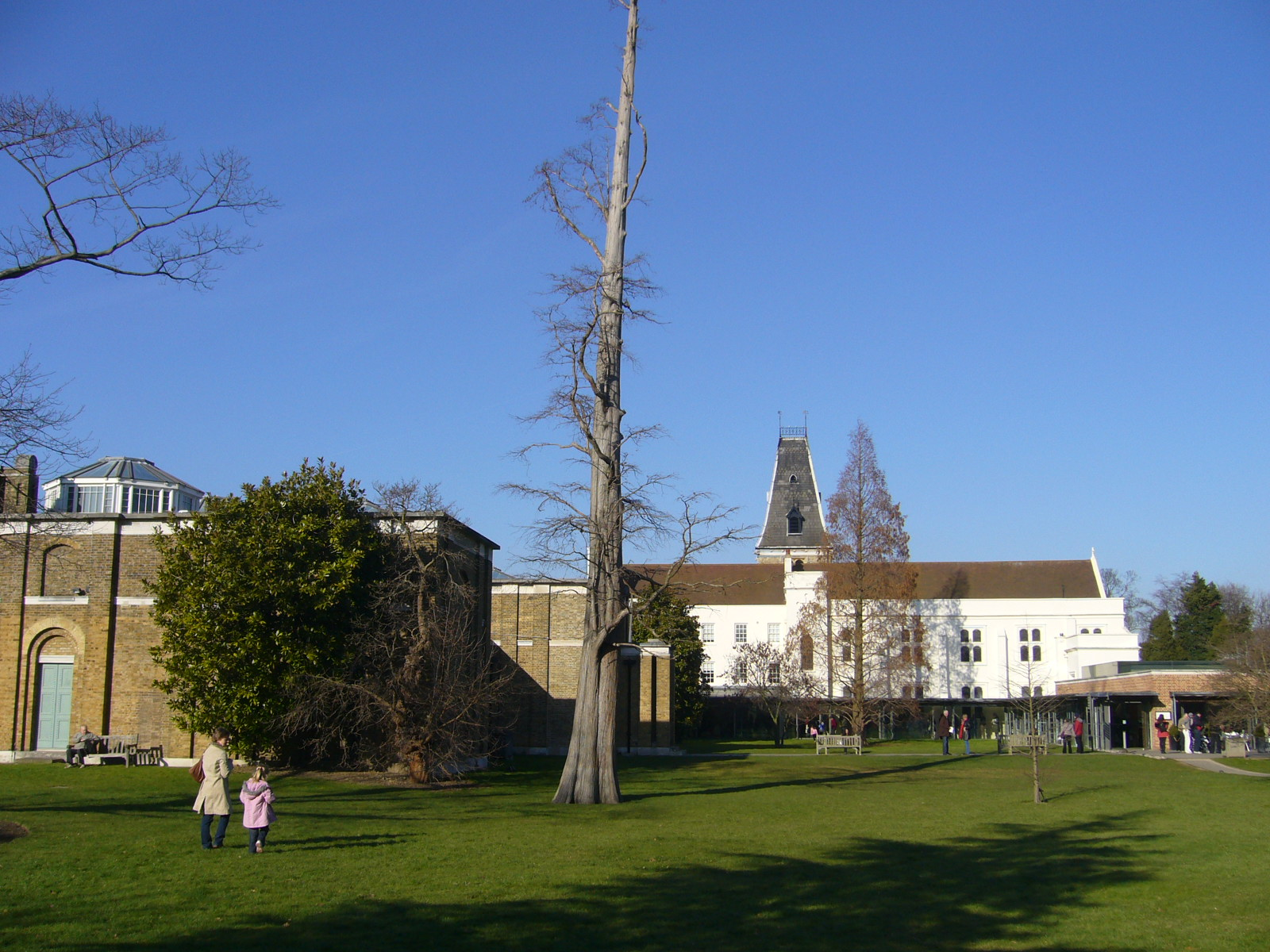
Dulwich Picture Gallery exterior looking north

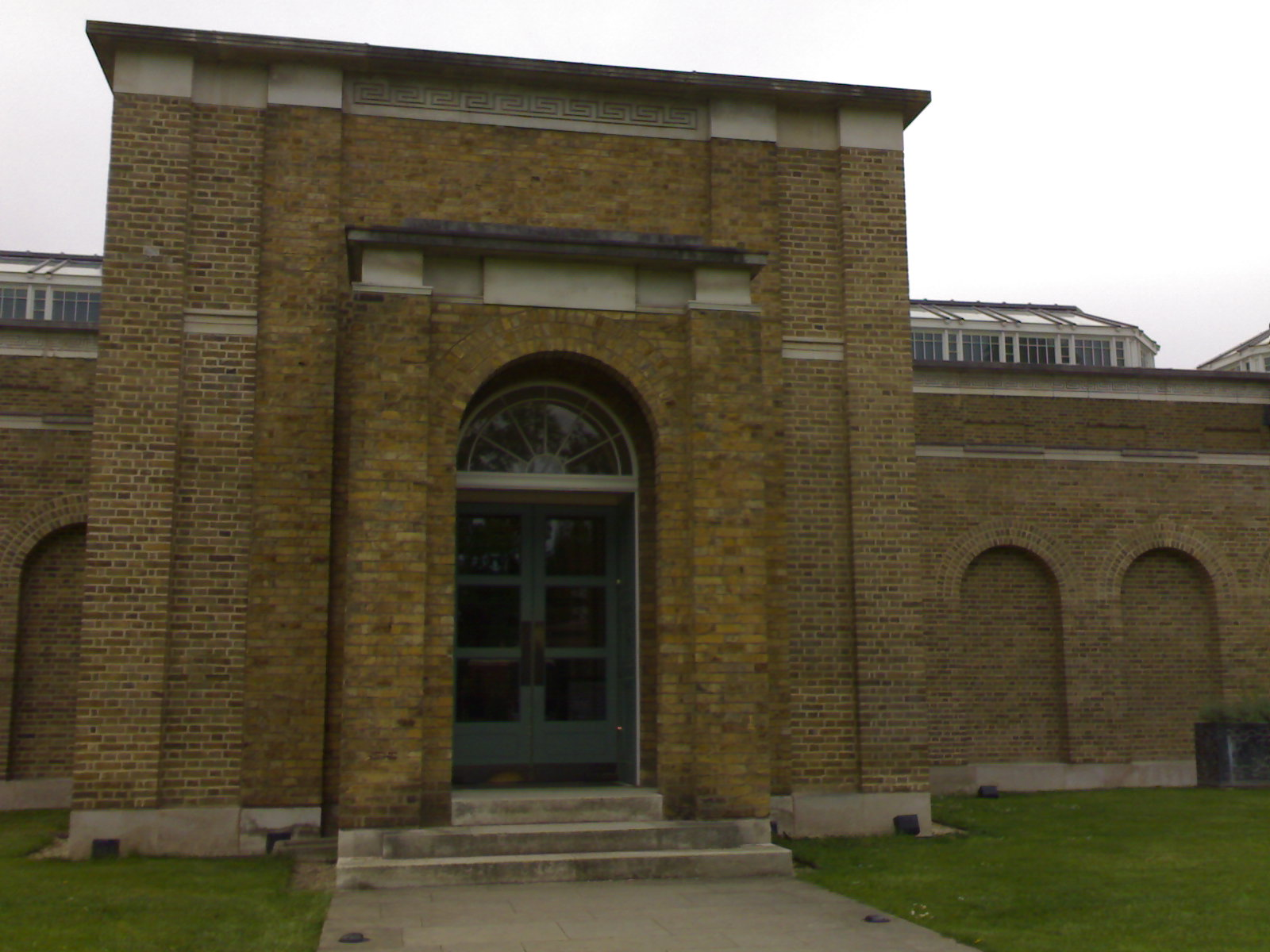
Exterior – east frontage

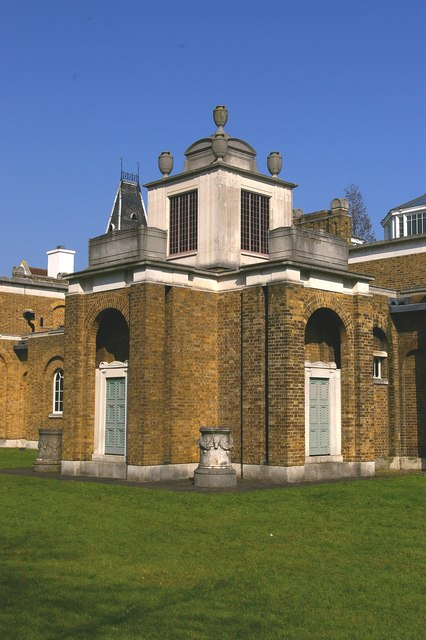
Mausoleum

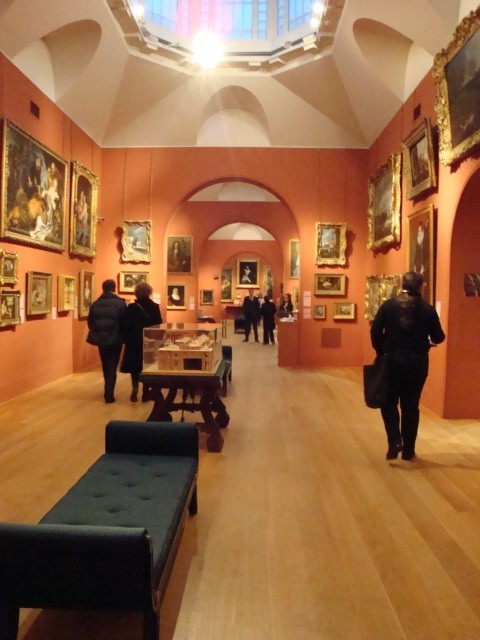
The main gallery

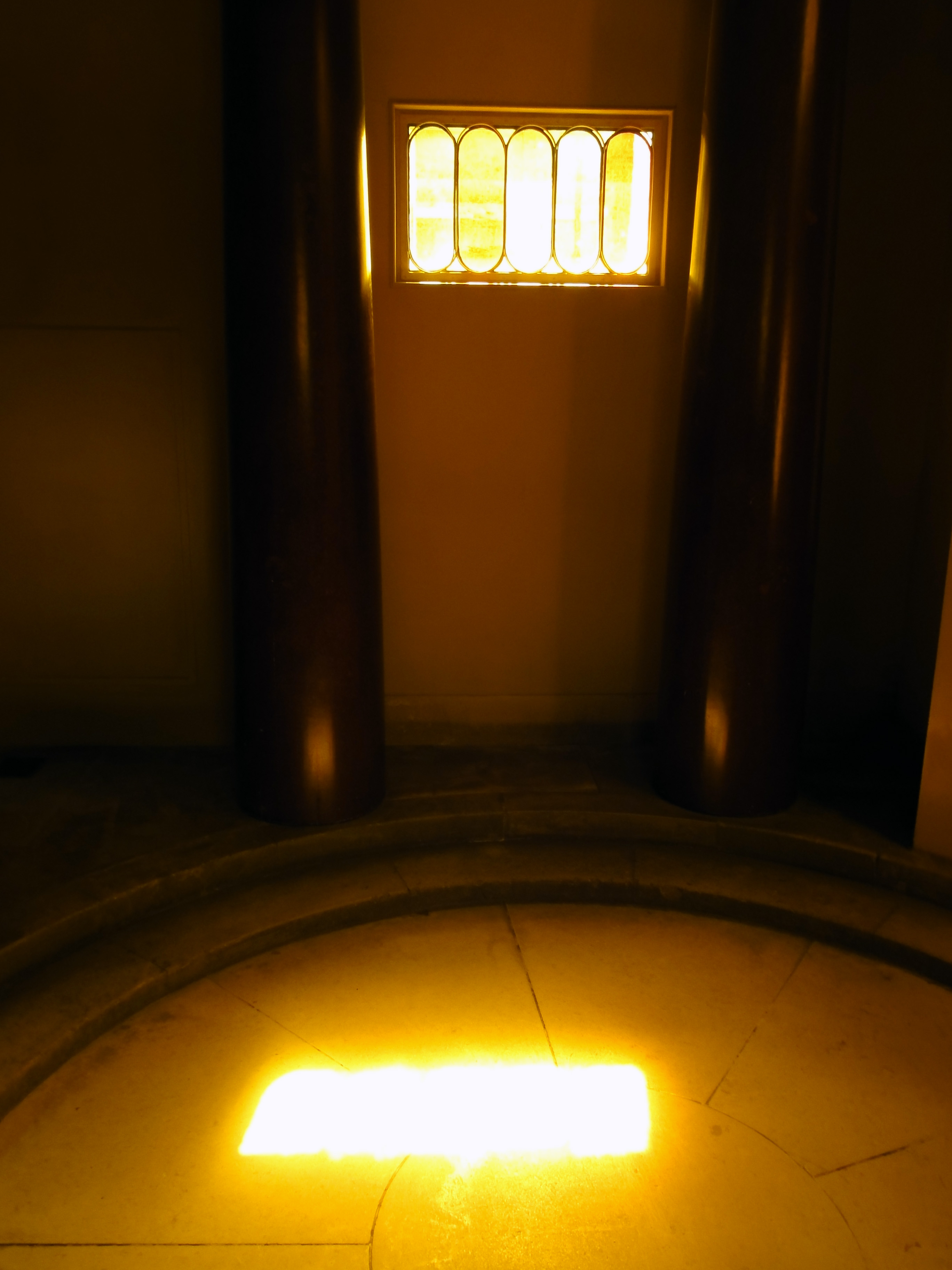
Inside the mausoleum

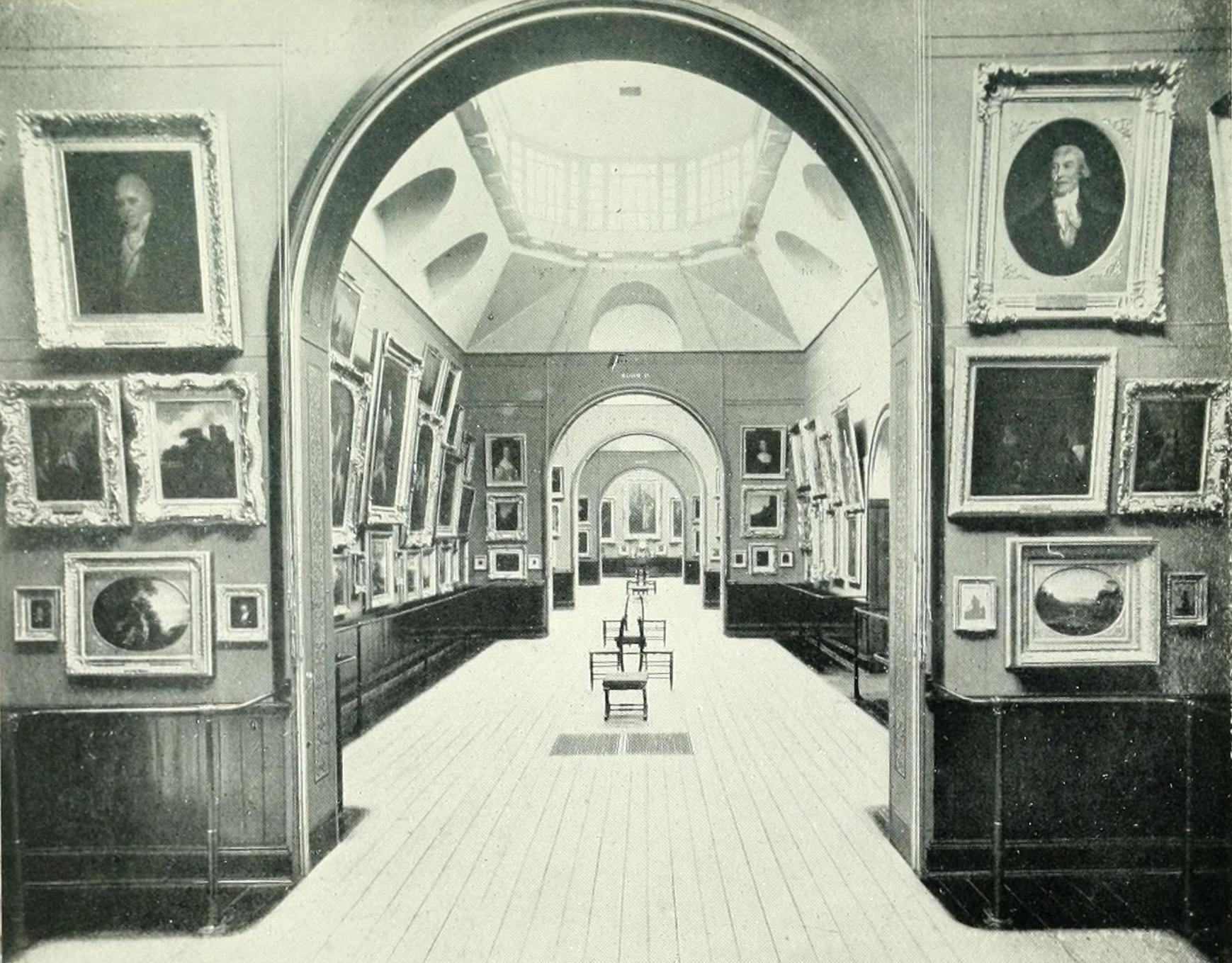
The main gallery in 1922

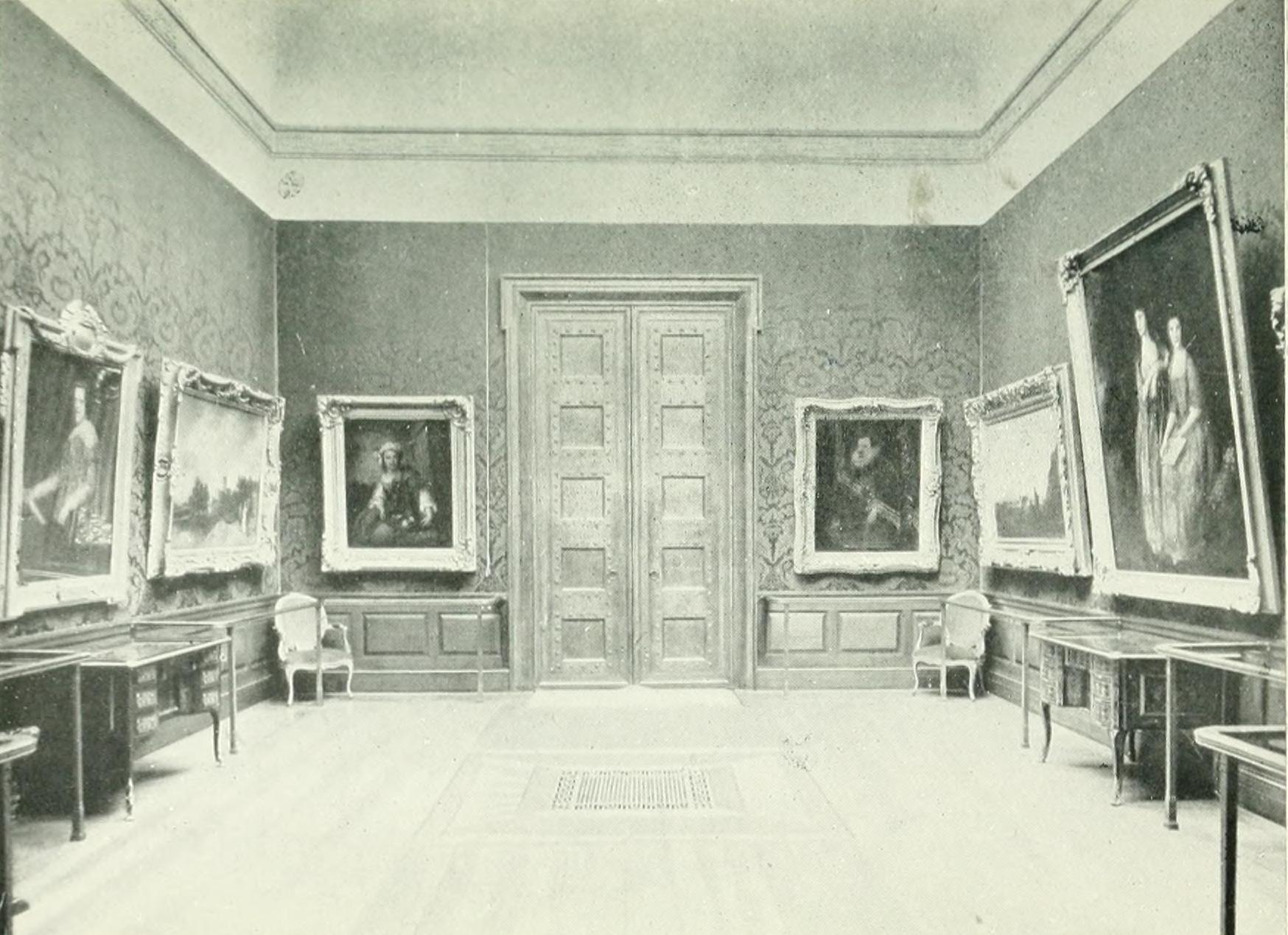
Room 9 in 1922

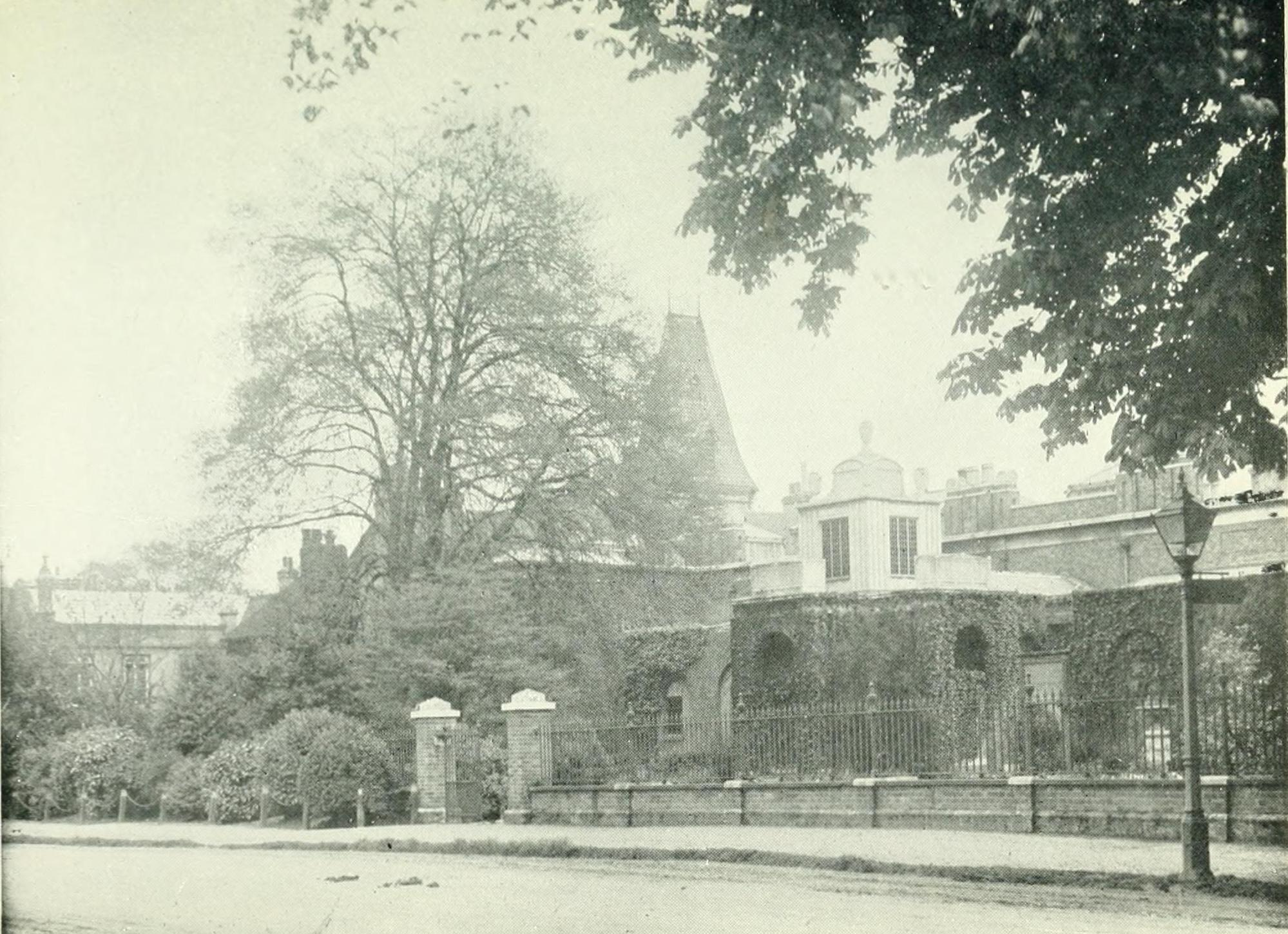
Exterior view in 1922

== Collection ==
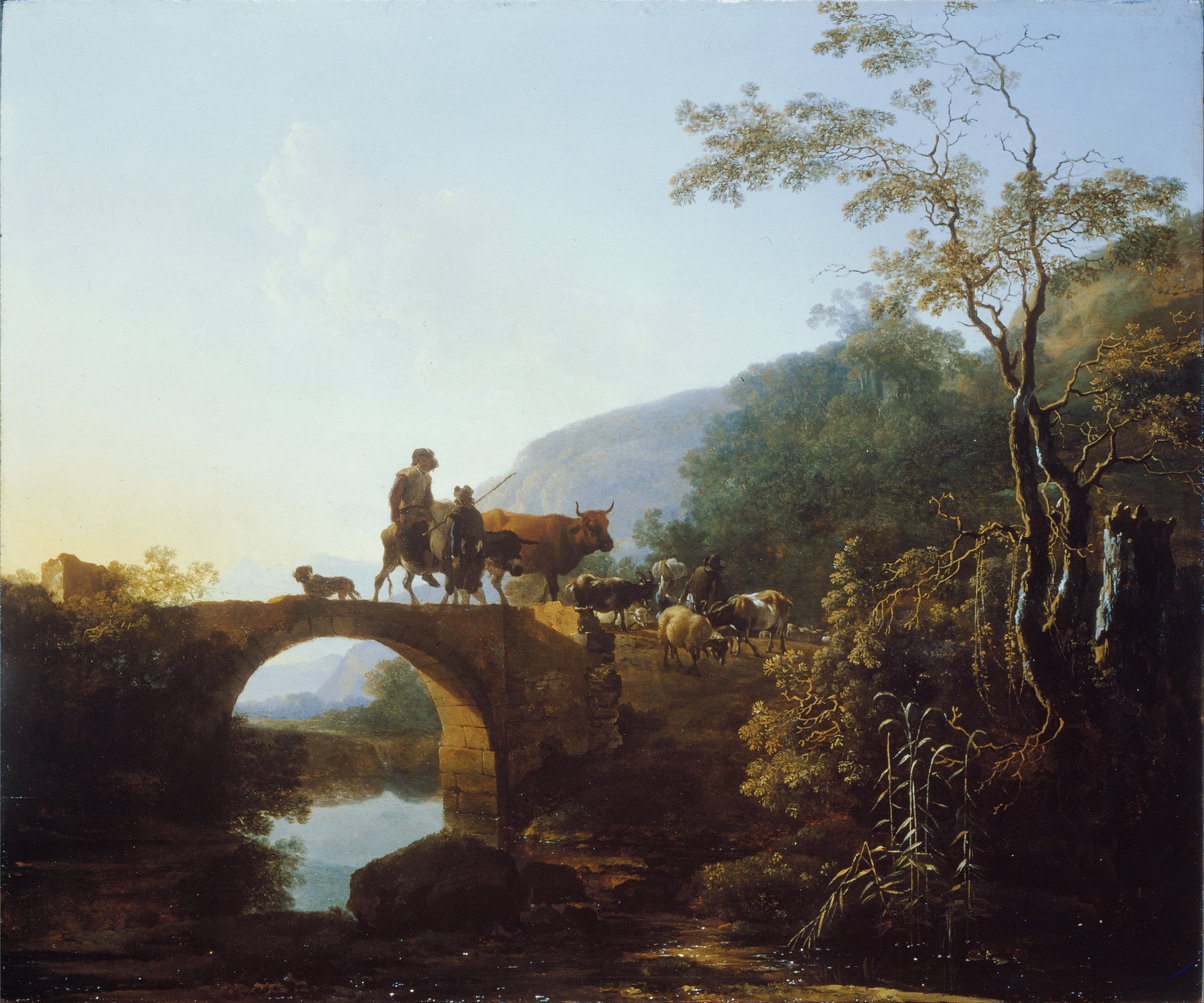
Adam Pynacker, Bridge in an Italian Landscape

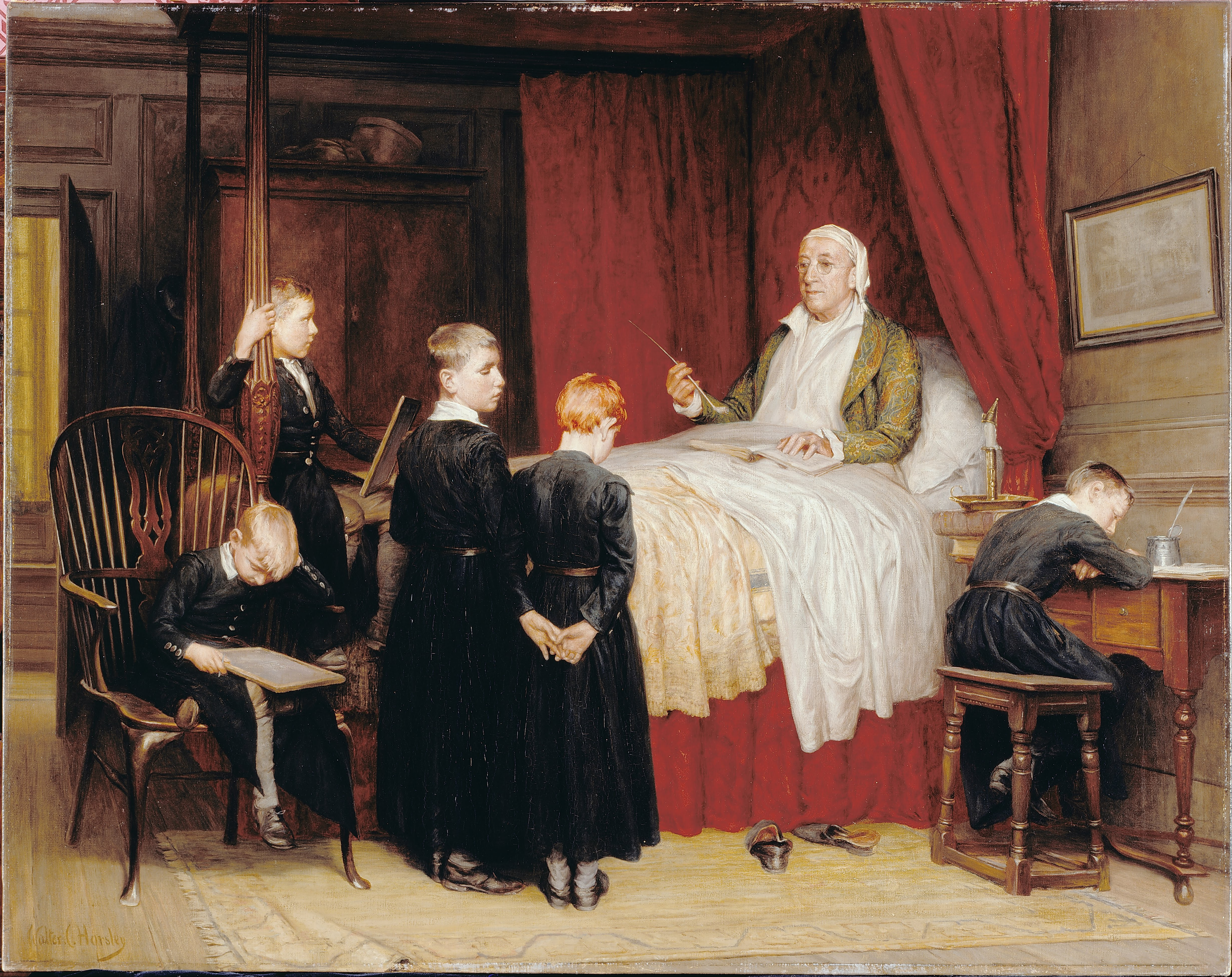
Walter Charles Horsley: Old-time Tuition at Dulwich College

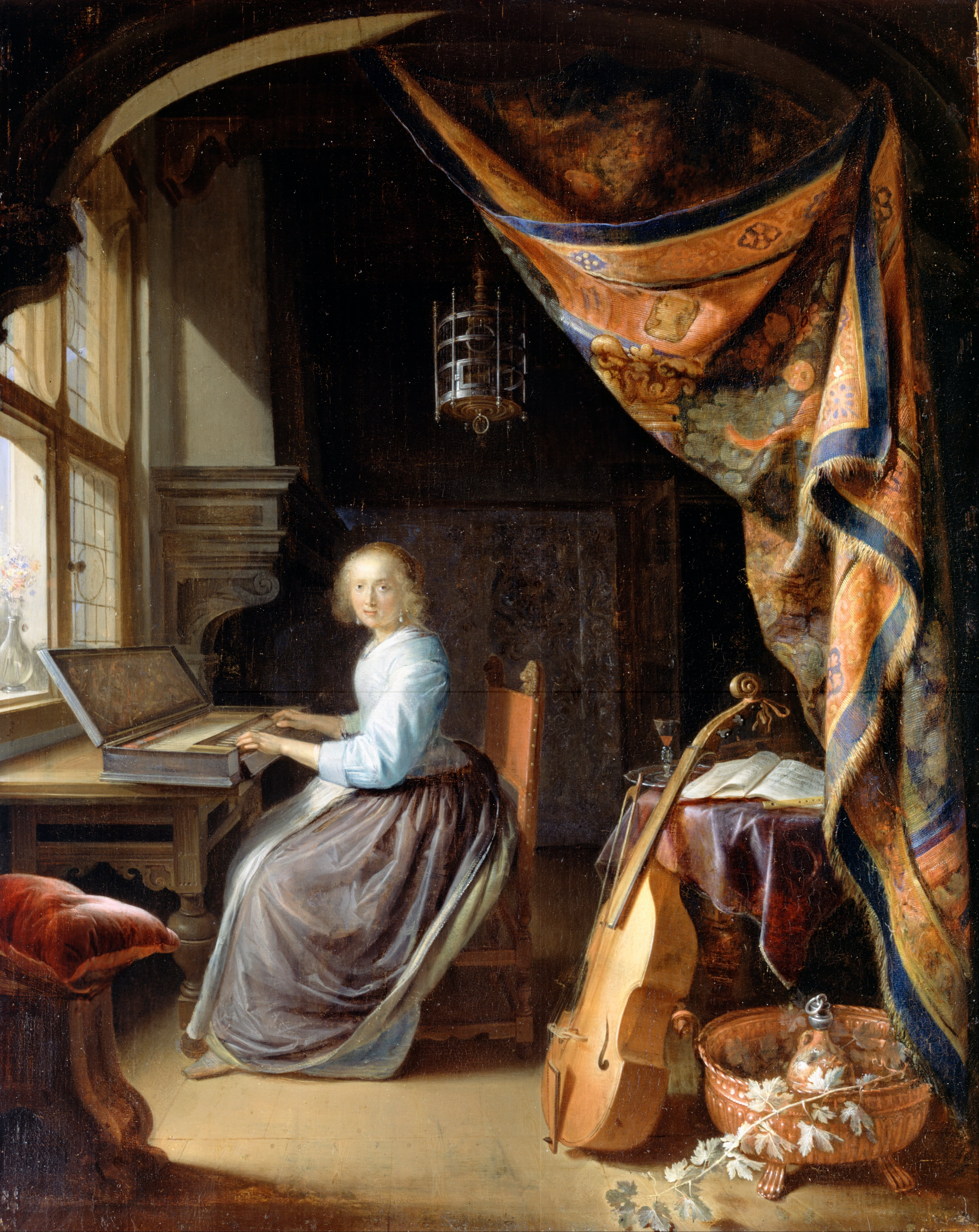
Gerrit Dou: A Woman playing a Clavichord

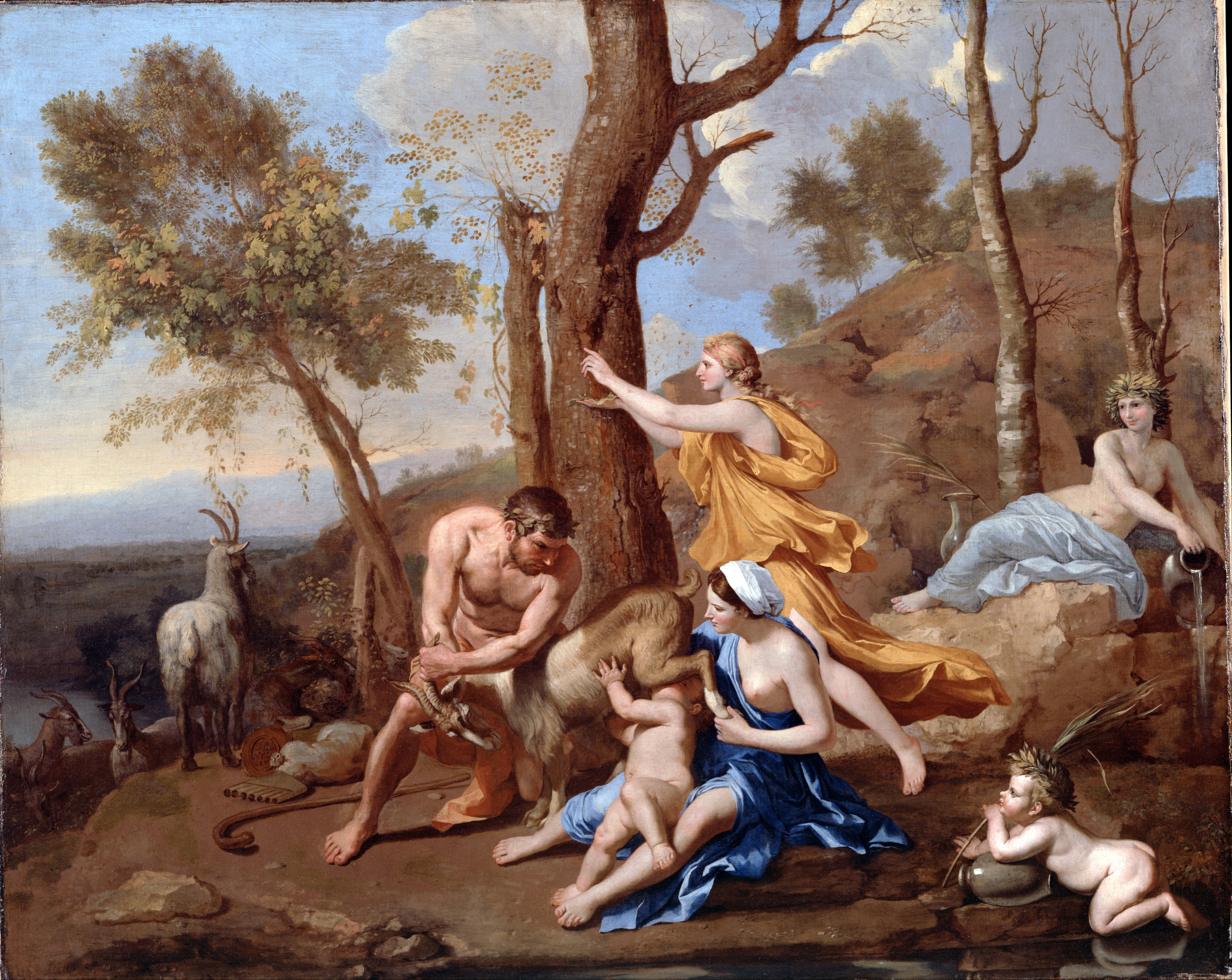
Nicolas Poussin, The Nurture of Jupiter.

Dutch School
- Aelbert Cuyp – 11 paintings;
- Gerrit Dou – 1 painting;
- Meyndert Hobbema – 1 painting;
- Charles Cornelisz de Hooch – 2 paintings;
- Aernout van der Neer – 1 painting;
- Adriaen van Ostade – 5 paintings;
- Rembrandt – 3 paintings;
- Jacob Isaakszoon van Ruisdael – 4 paintings;
- Adriaen van de Velde – 2 paintings;
- Willem van de Velde the Younger – 3 paintings;
- Jan Weenix – 1 painting;
- Philip Wouwerman – 12 paintings

English School
- William Dobson – 1 painting;
- Thomas Gainsborough – 7 paintings;
- William Hogarth – 2 paintings;
- Sir Edwin Landseer – 1 painting;
- Thomas Lawrence – 3 paintings;
- Joshua Reynolds – 9 paintings;
- John Constable – 1 painting

Flemish School
- Marcus Gheeraerts the Younger – 1 painting;
- Peter Paul Rubens – 10 paintings;
- David Teniers the Younger – 19 paintings;
- Anthony van Dyck – 5 paintings;

French School
- Gaspard Dughet – 4 paintings;
- Jean-Honoré Fragonard – 1 painting;
- Claude Lorrain – 4 paintings;
- Nicolas Poussin – 6 paintings;
- Claude-Joseph Vernet – 6 paintings;
- Jean-Antoine Watteau – 2 paintings

Italian School
- Canaletto, (Giovanni Antonio Canal) – 2 paintings;
- Annibale Carracci – 4 paintings;
- Piero di Cosimo – 1 painting;
- Guercino, (Giovanni Francesco Barbieri) – 2 paintings;
- Raphael, (Raffaello Sanzio) – 2 paintings;
- Guido Reni – 2 paintings;
- Sebastiano Ricci – 2 paintings;
- Giovanni Battista Tiepolo – 3 paintings;
- Giorgio Vasari – 1 painting;
- Paolo Veronese – 1 painting;
- Francesco Zuccarelli – 3 paintings

Spanish School
- Bartolomé Esteban Murillo – 4 paintings

=== Gallery ===
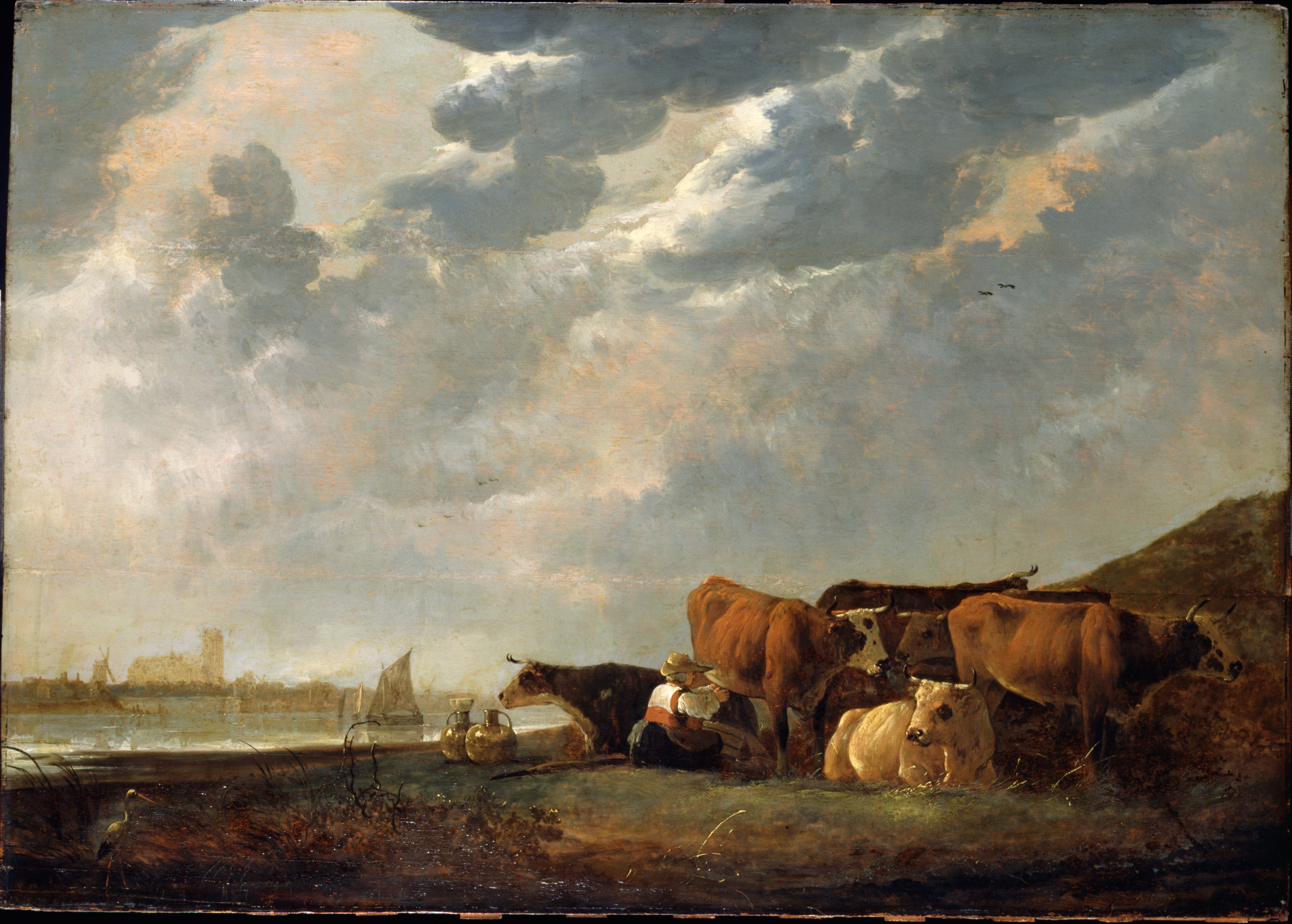
Aelbert Cuyp: Cattle near the Maas, with Dordrecht in the distance

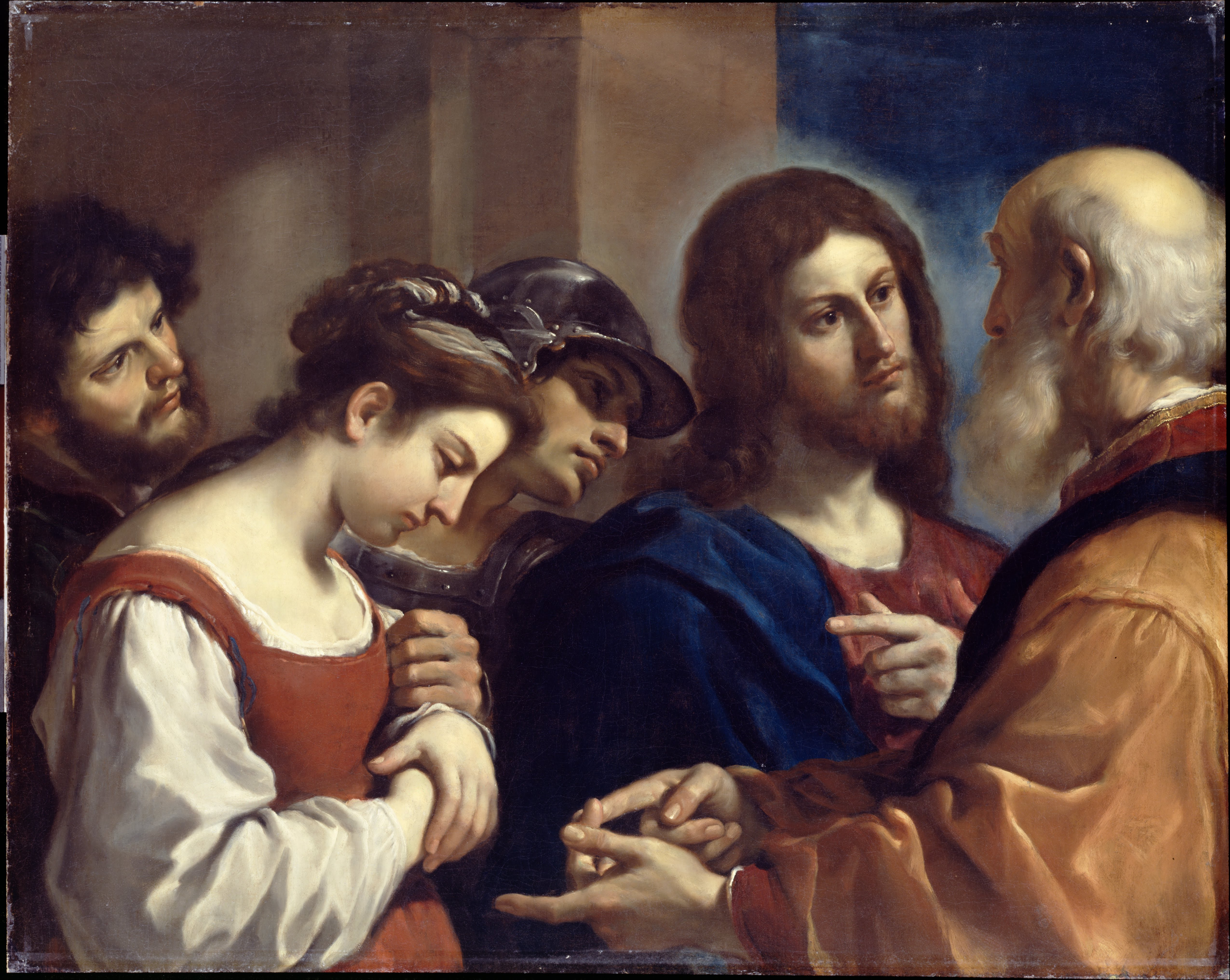
Guercino: The Woman Taken in Adultery
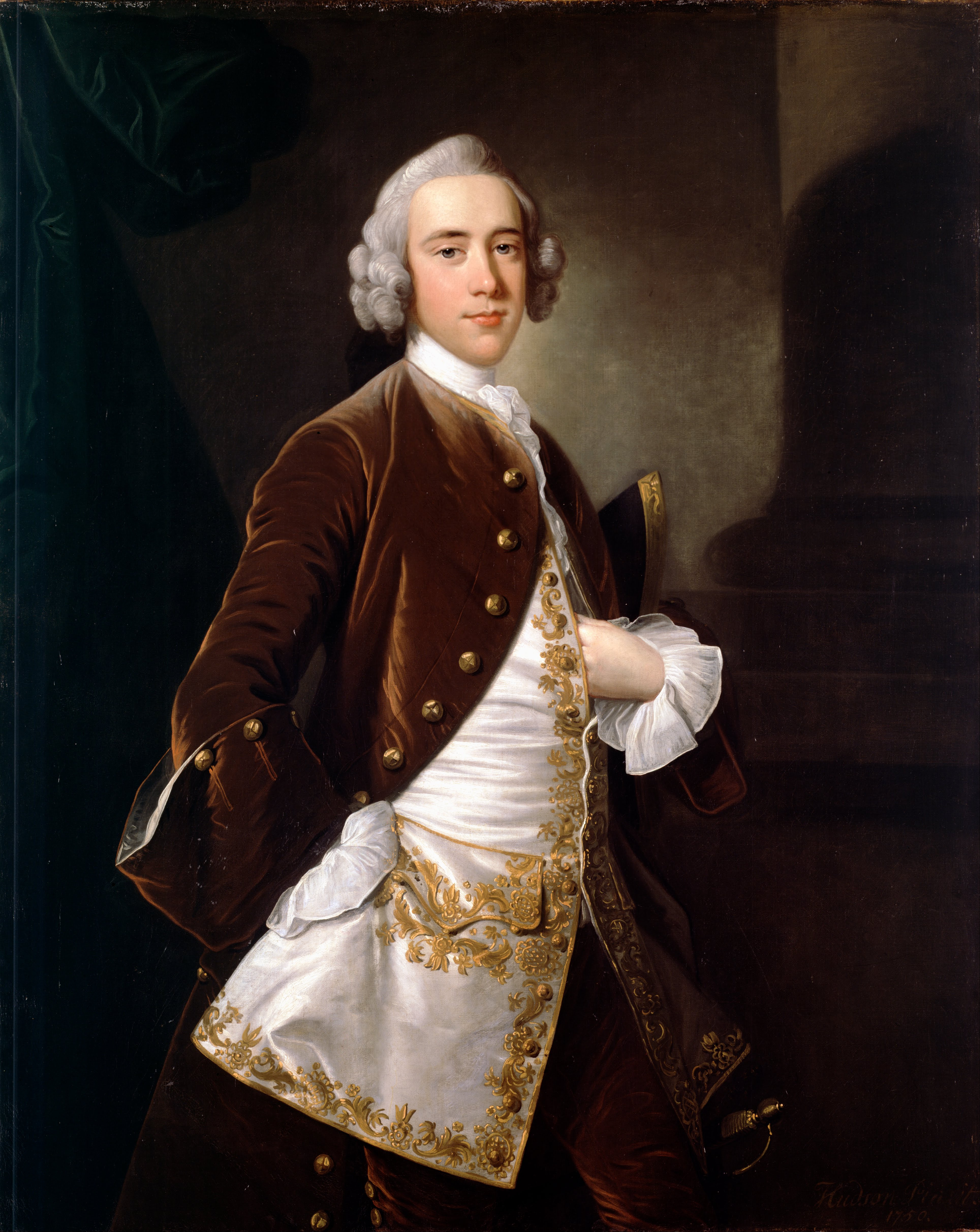
Thomas Hudson: Portrait of a Man

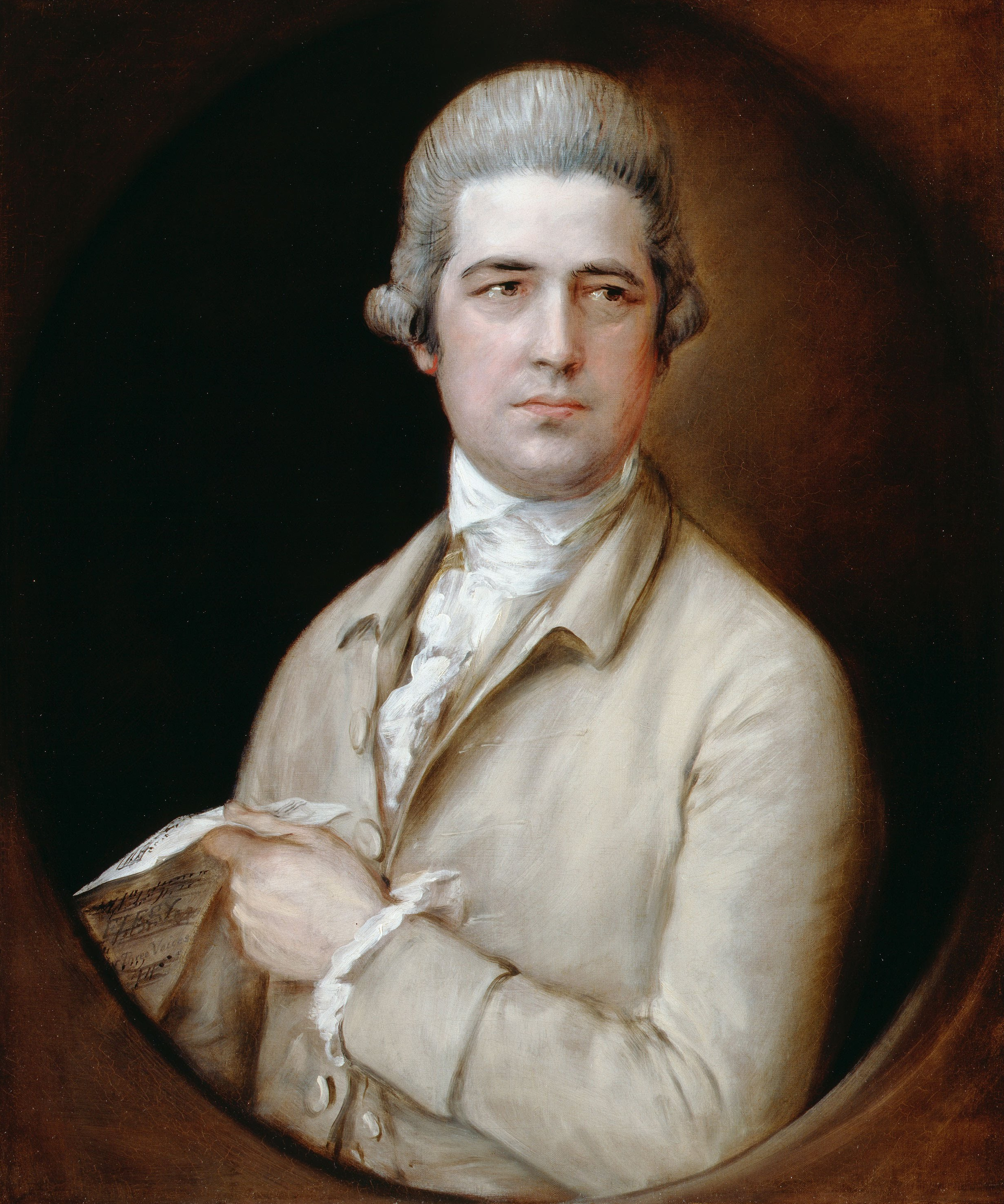
Gainsborough, Thomas: Portrait of Thomas Linley the Elder

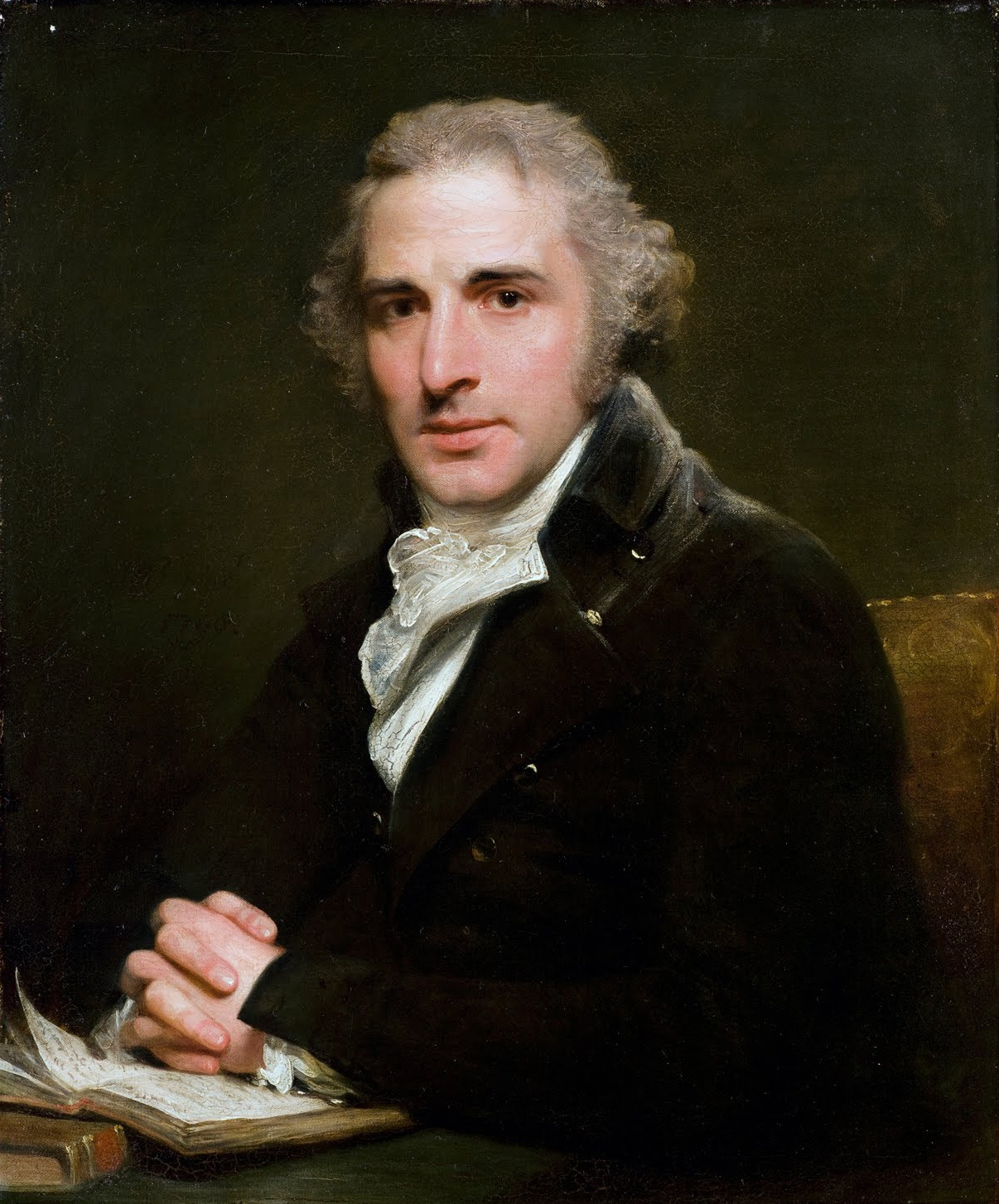
William Beechey: Portrait of John Philip Kemble

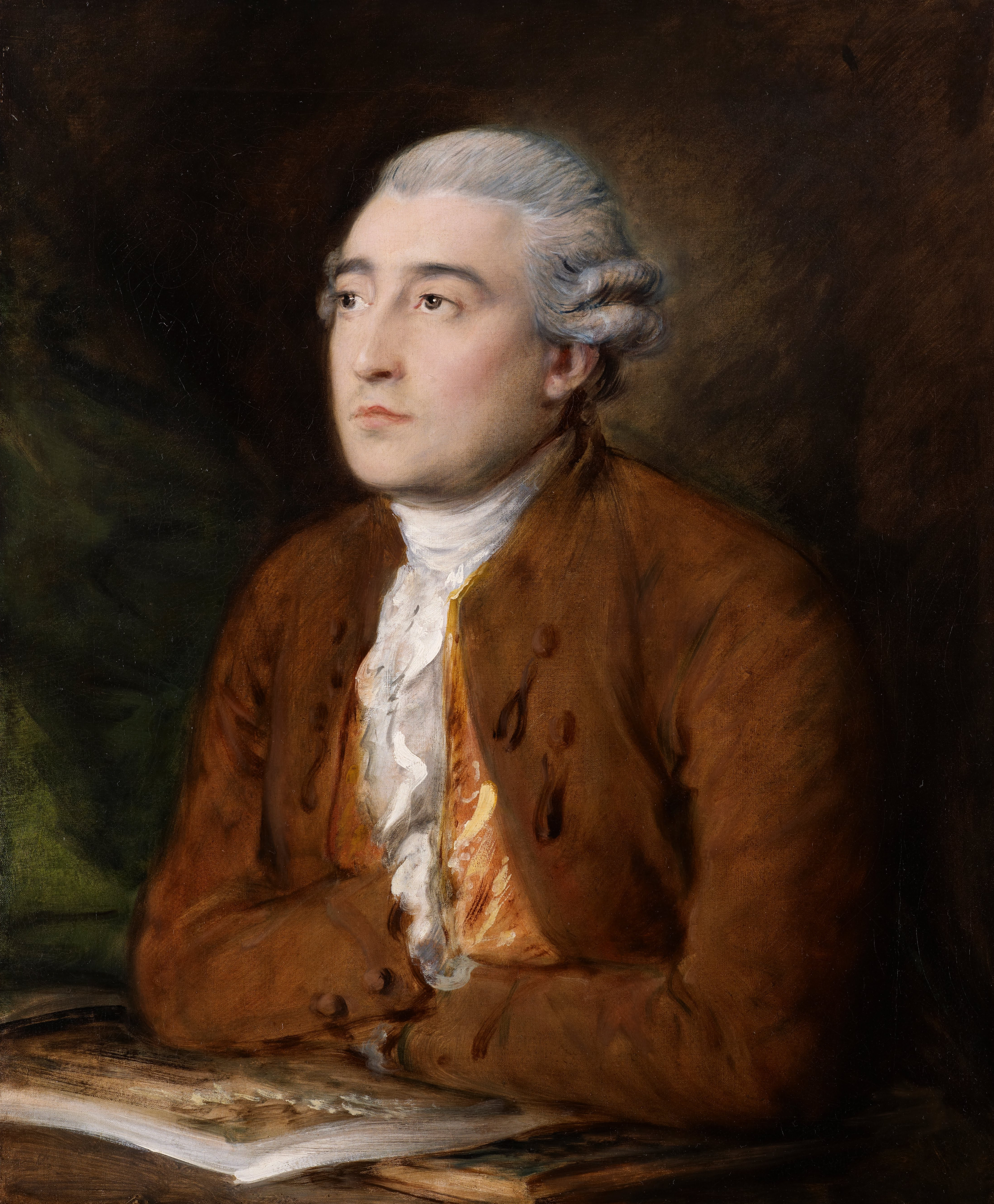
Thomas Gainsborough: Portrait of Philip James de Loutherbourg

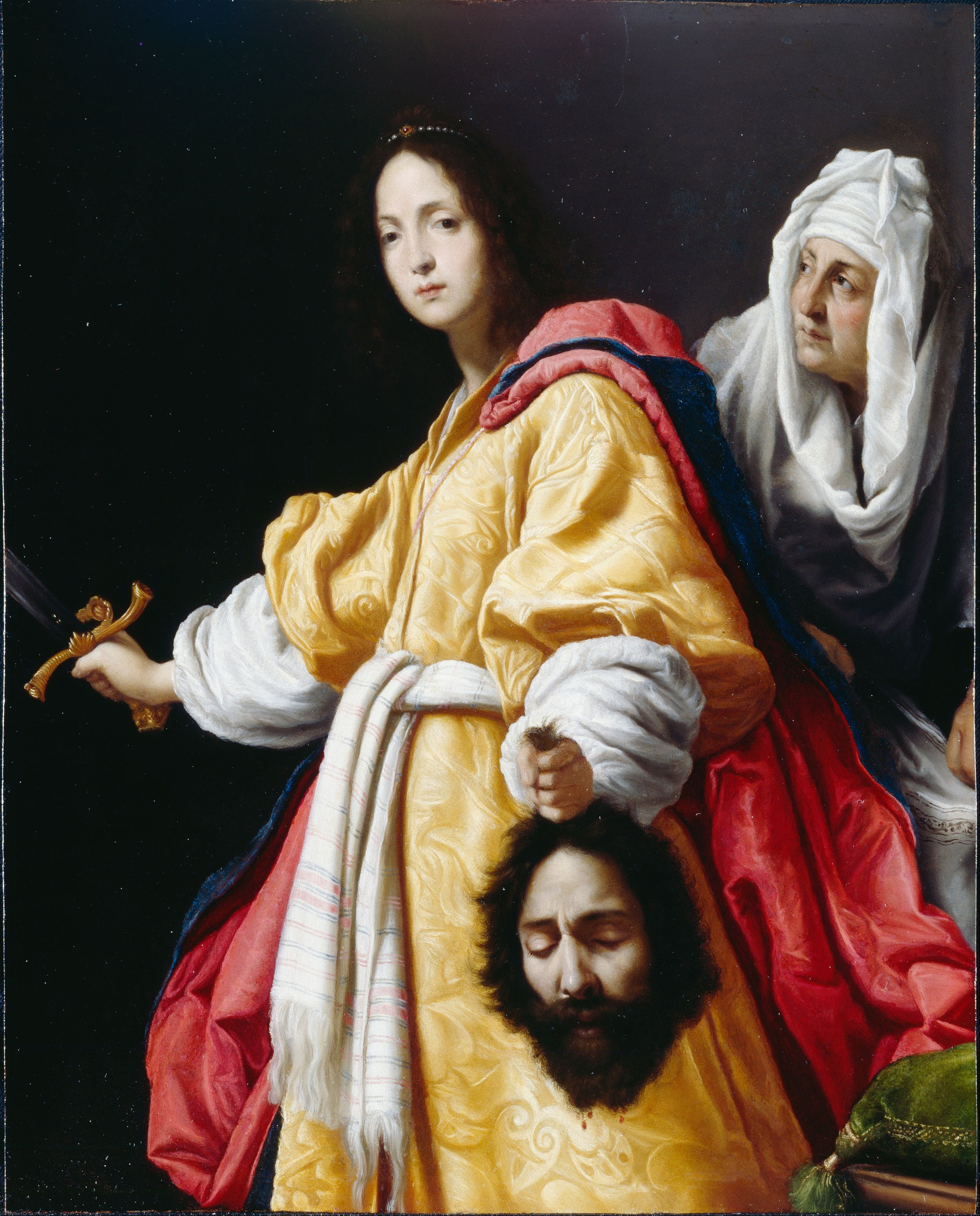
Cristofano Allori: Judith

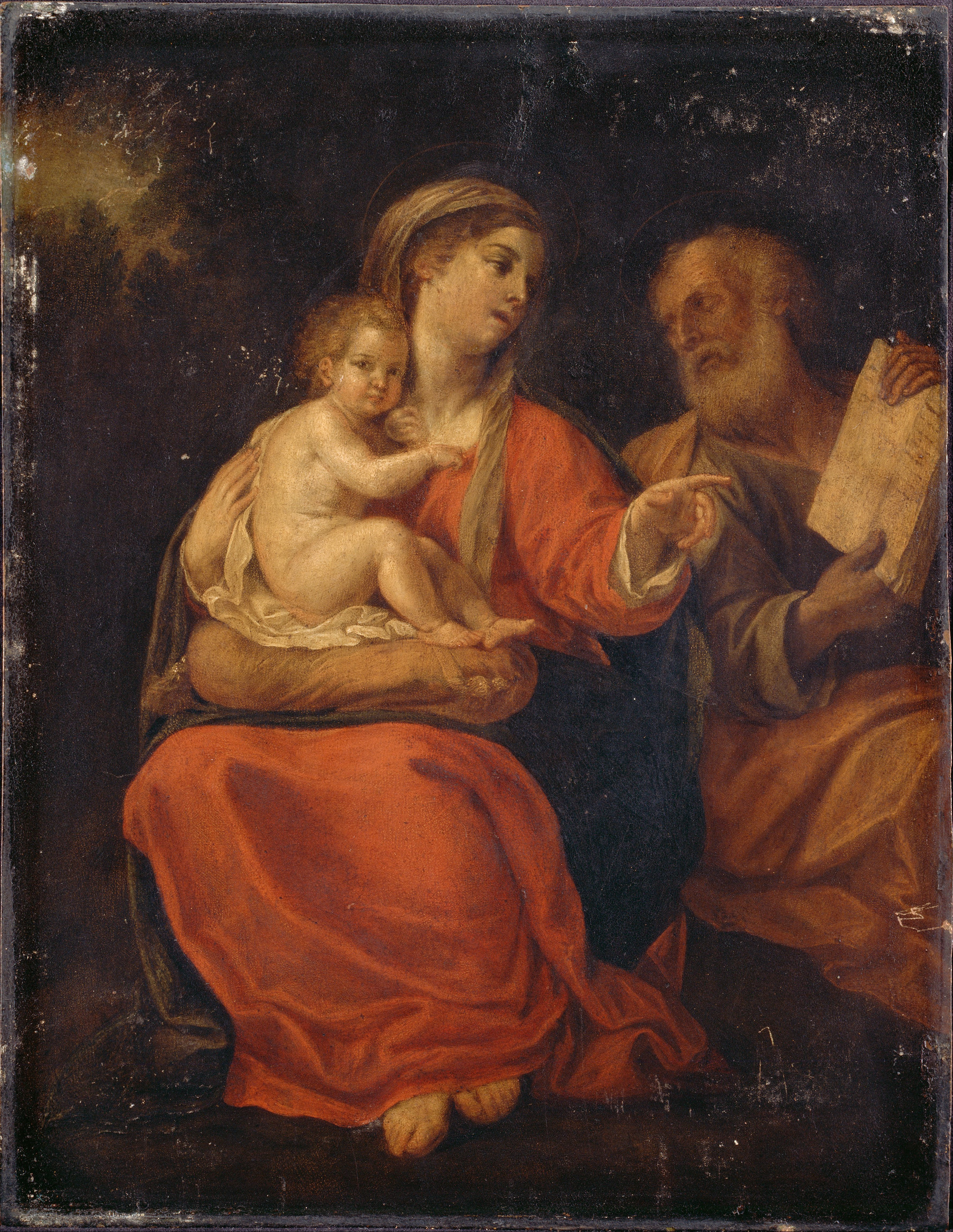
Francesco Albani, Holy Family

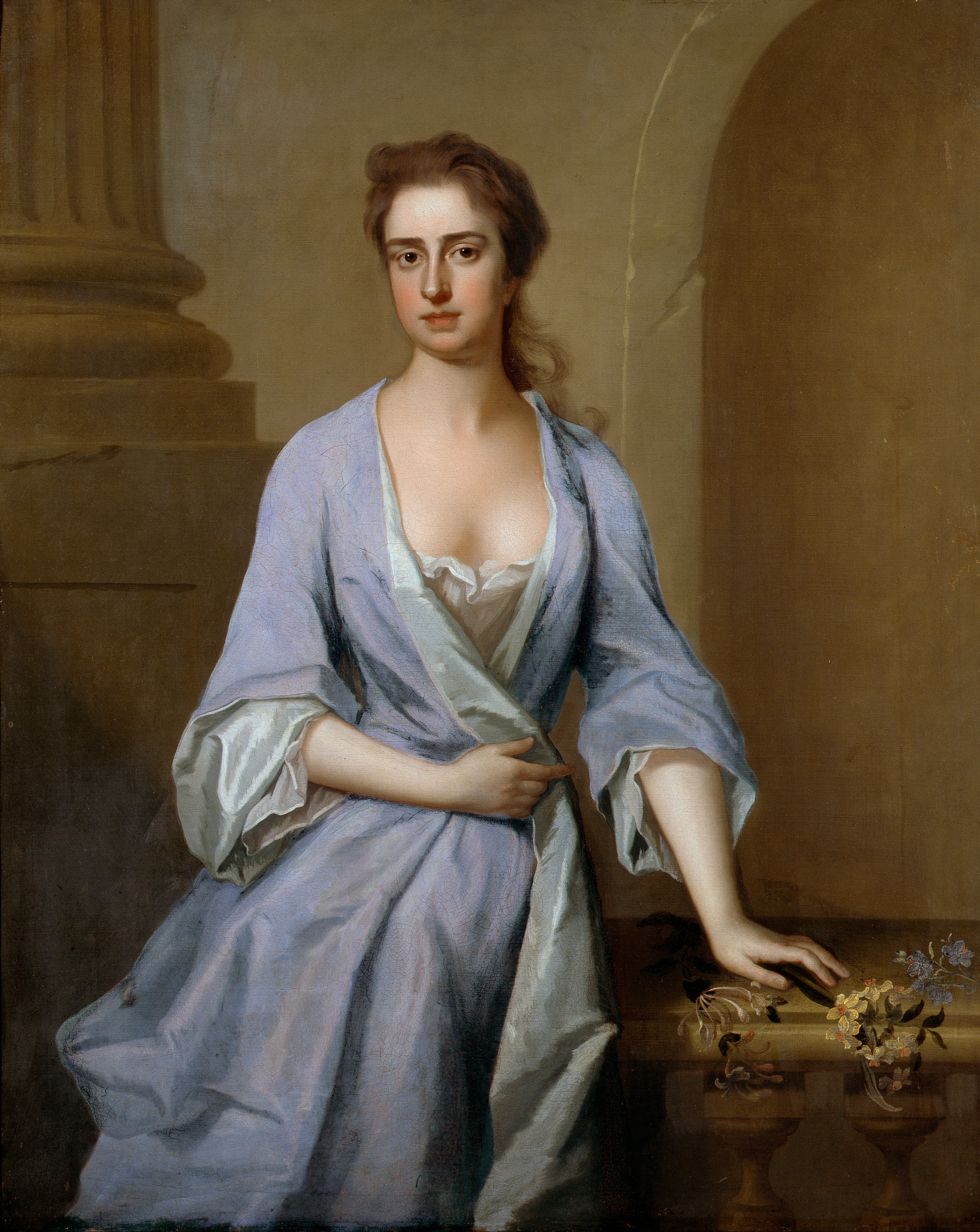
Michael Dahl: Portrait of a Lady

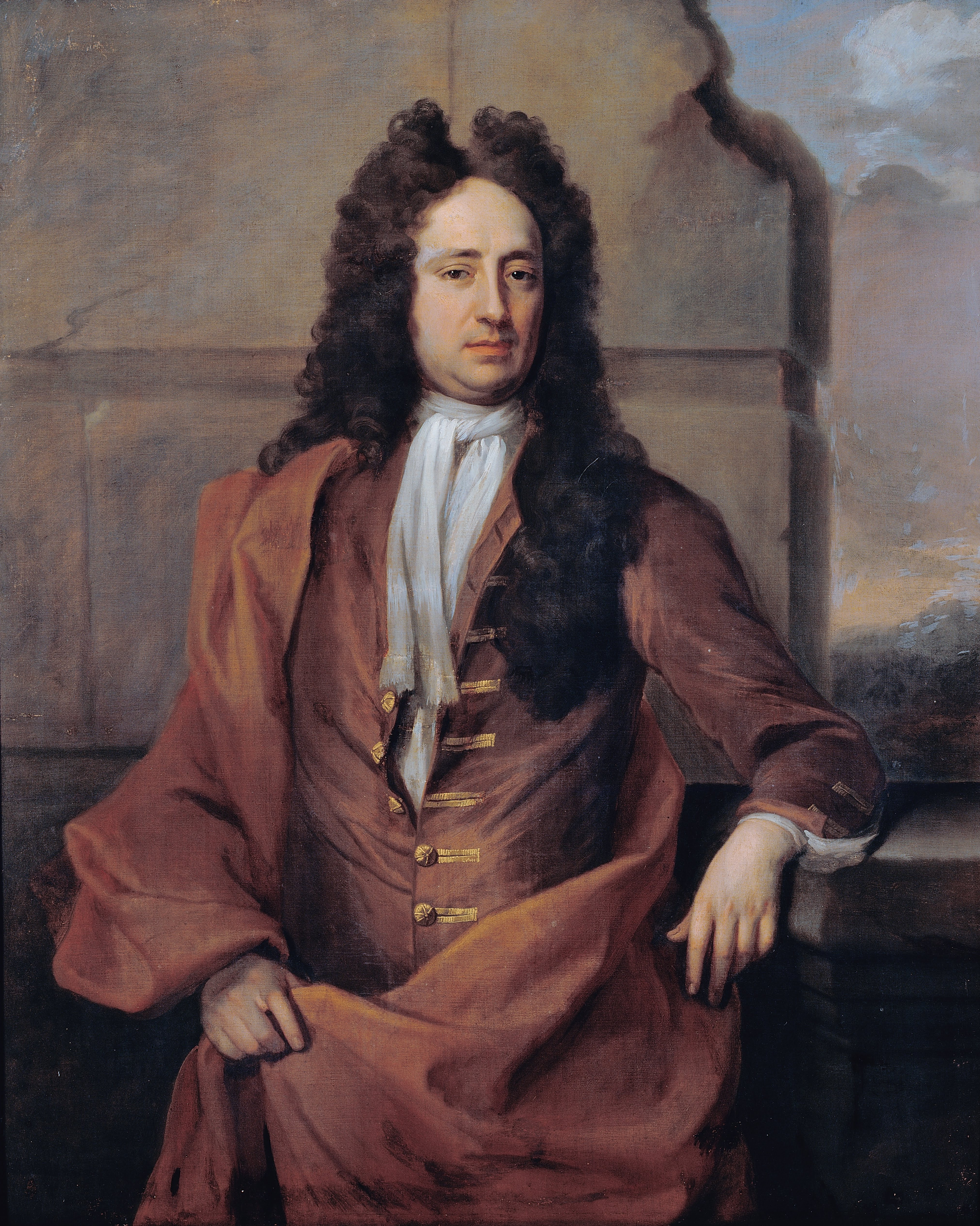
Michael Dahl: Portrait of a Man

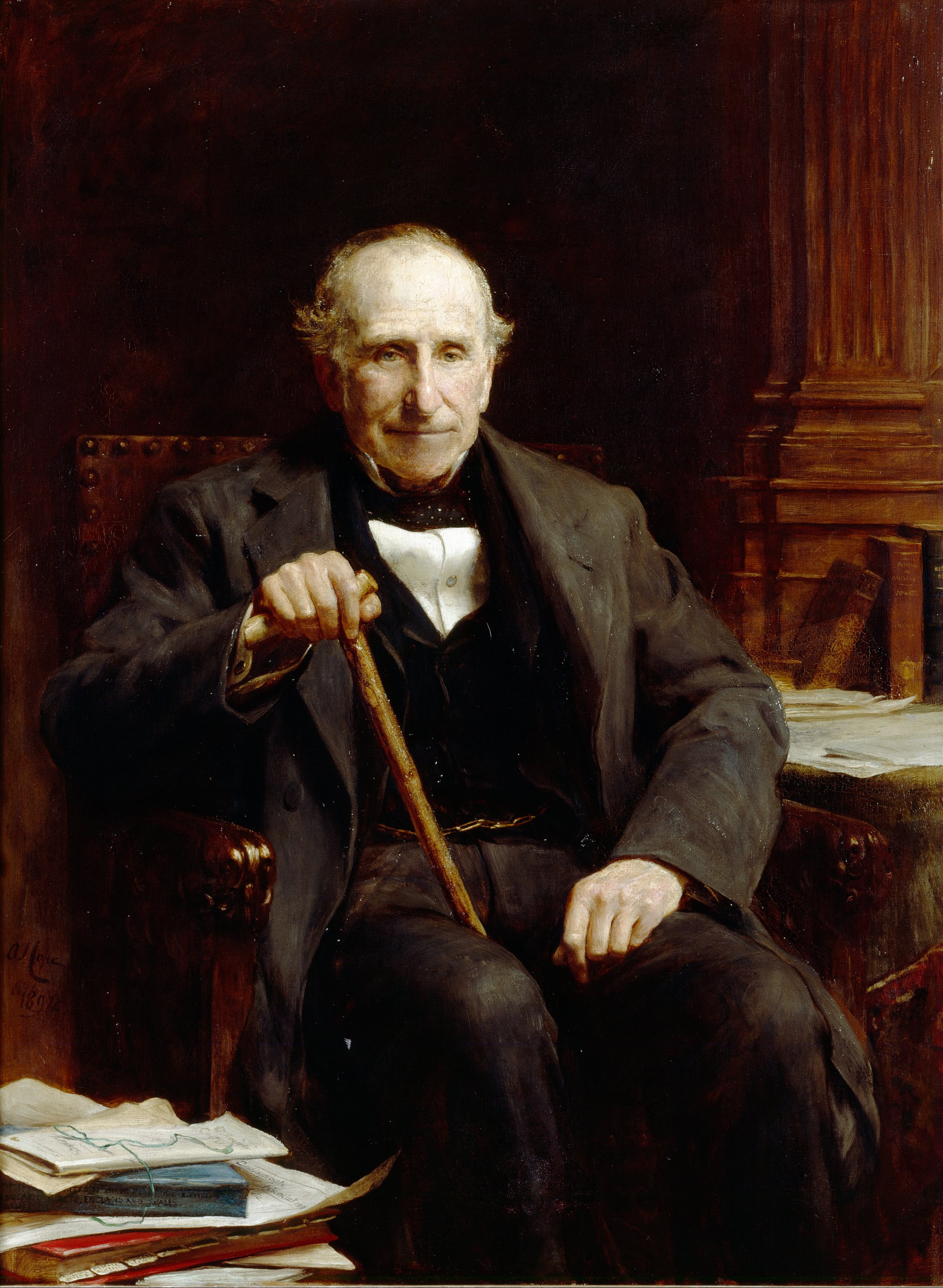
Sir Arthur Stockdale Cope: The Reverend William Rogers

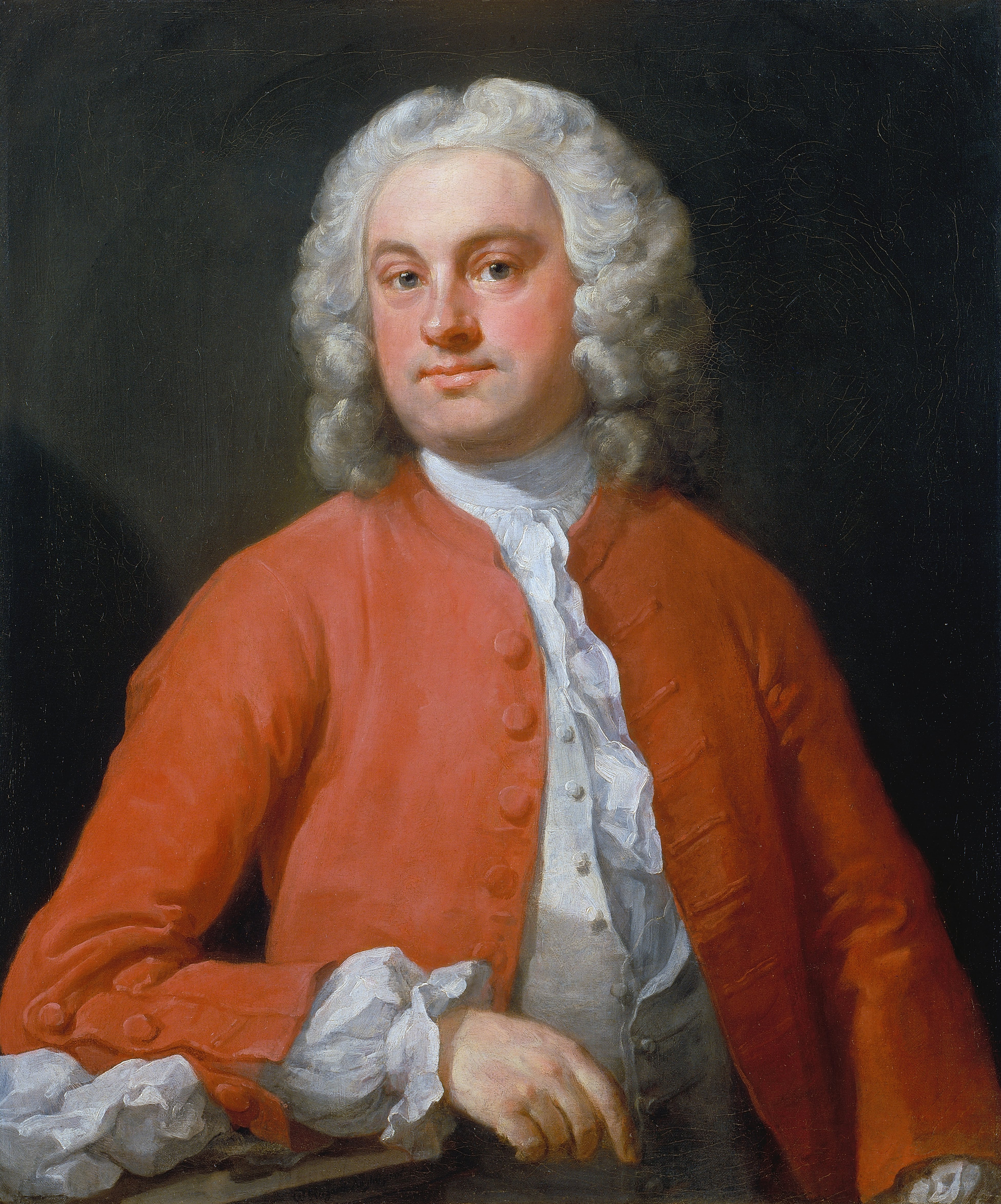
William Hogarth: Portrait of a Man

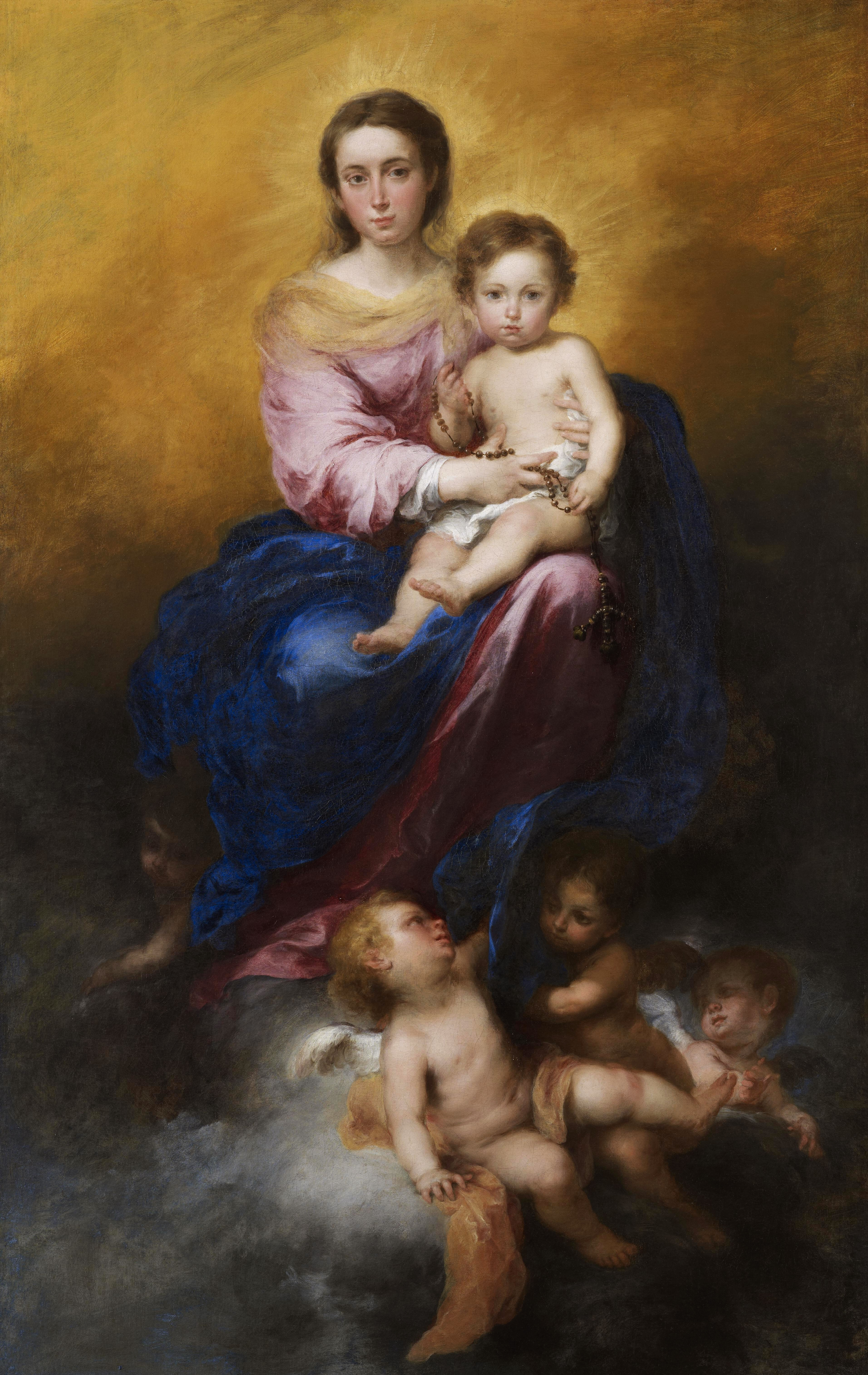
Bartolomé Estéban Murillo: The Madonna of the Rosary

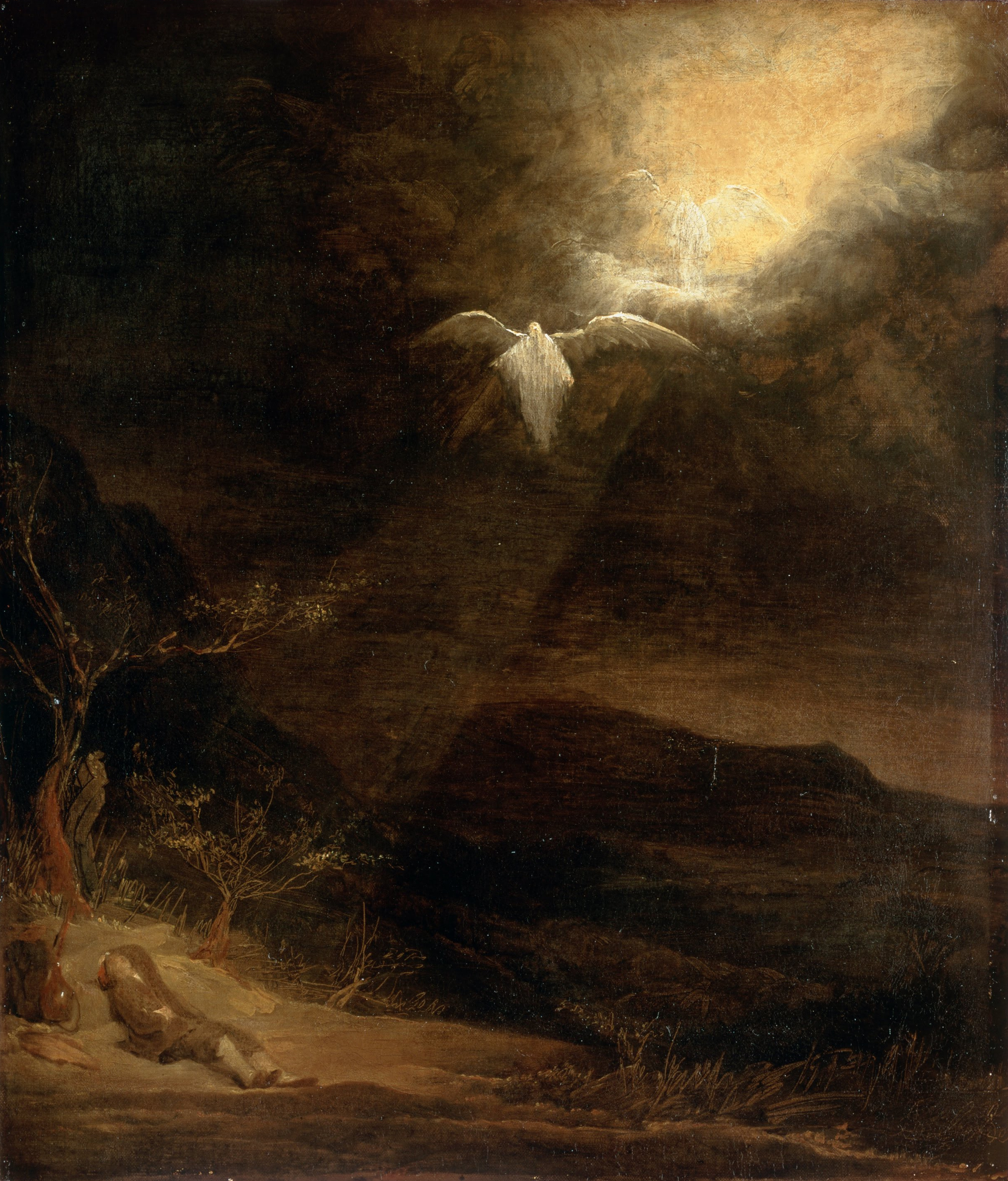
Arent de Gelder: Jacob's Dream

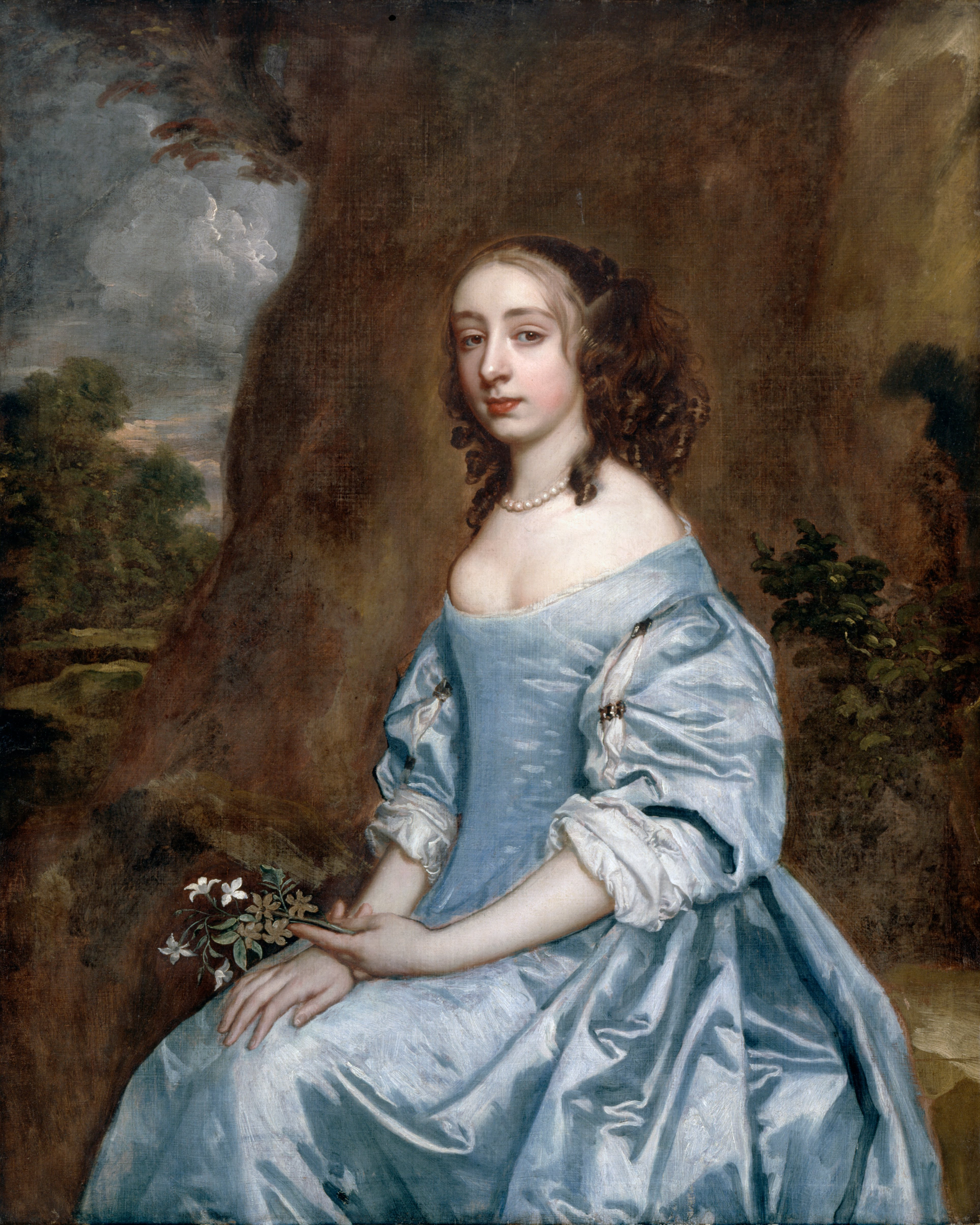
Sir Peter Lely: Portrait of a Lady in Blue holding a Flower

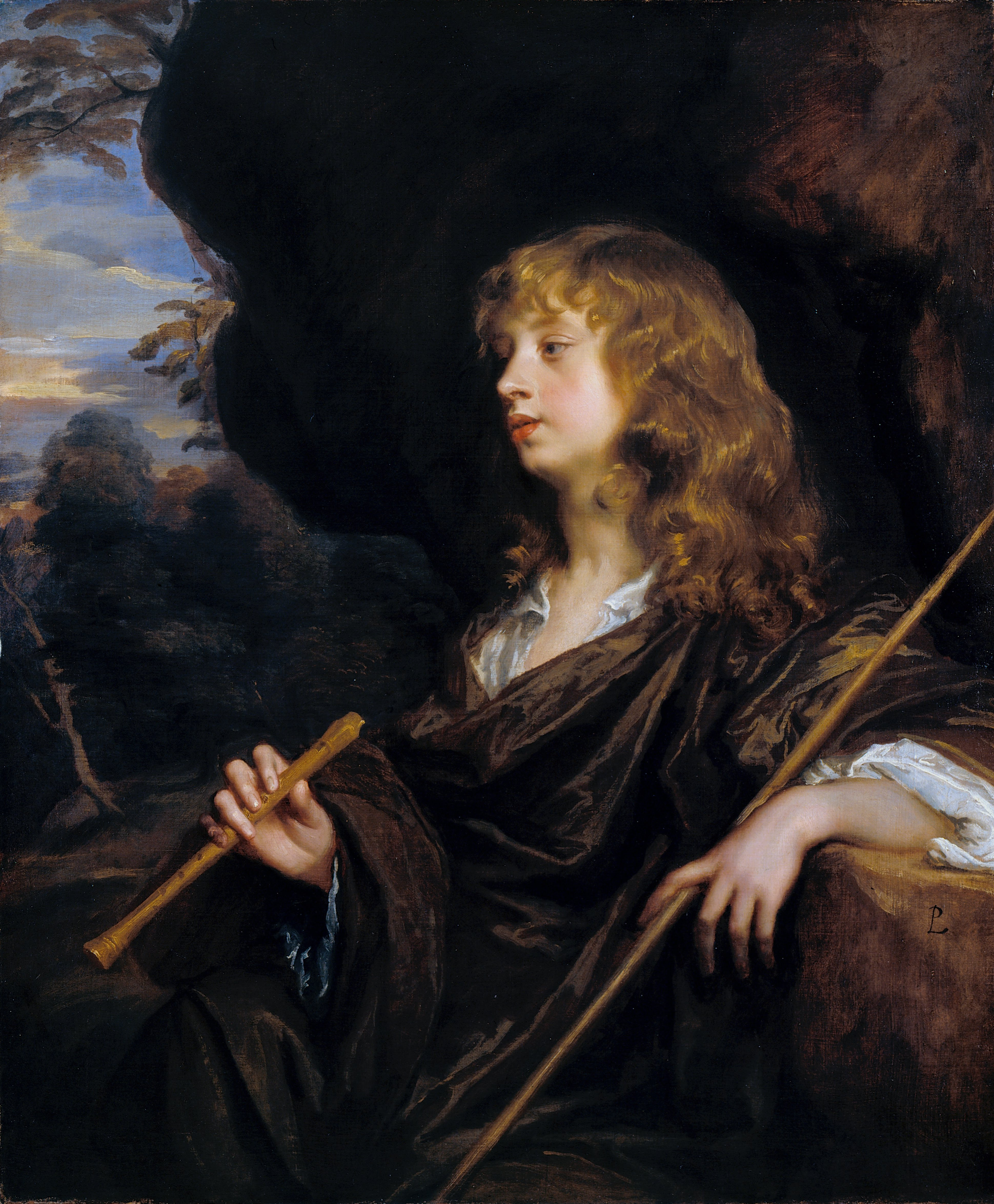
Sir Peter Lely: A Boy as a Shepherd

== Directors ==
Jennifer Scott became director in April 2017, following Ian A.C. Dejardin who had been director since 2005. From 1996 to 2005, Desmond Shawe-Taylor, later Surveyor of the Queen's Pictures, was the director. Giles Waterfield was director from 1979-1996.

== See also ==
- Dulwich OnView, a blog-based magazine associated with the gallery
- Dulwich Outdoor Gallery, an associated distributed gallery of street art
- Helen Hillyard, curator
