= Vogtherr =

Vogtherr is a surname. Notable people with the surname include:

- Christoph Vogtherr (born 1965), German art historian
- Ernest George Frederick Vogtherr (1898–1973), New Zealand bacon curer, businessman and art collector
- Heinrich Vogtherr (1490–1556), Austrian artist, printer, poet and writer
