= Jennifer Scott =

Jennifer Scott may refer to:

- Jennifer Scott (musician), Canadian singer and pianist
- Jennifer Scott (mathematician), British mathematician
- Jennifer Scott (curator), director of Dulwich Picture Gallery

== See also ==
- Jenny Scott, English journalist and economist
