= Helen Hillyard =

British curator and art historian

- Education: University of Cambridge; Courtauld Institute of Art
- Occupations: Curator, art historian
- Employer: Dulwich Picture Gallery
- Known for: Curatorial and scholarly work on seventeenth-century Dutch and Flemish art
- Title: Head of Collection

Helen Hillyard is a British curator and art historian specialising in seventeenth-century Dutch and Flemish art. She is Head of Collection at the Dulwich Picture Gallery in London.

Her work encompasses collection research, exhibitions and interpretive projects concerned with historic painting and its relationship with contemporary audiences. She has also contributed public commentary on discoveries and reunions involving seventeenth-century Dutch paintings.

== Career ==
After her studies, Hillyard was selected for the 2013–14 National Gallery Curatorial Traineeship Programme, supported by the Art Fund and the Vivmar Foundation. At the National Gallery she worked on Strange Beauty: Masters of the German Renaissance, gallery rehangs and public programmes before undertaking a placement at Birmingham Museum and Art Gallery.

In Birmingham, she researched and redisplayed the museum's seventeenth-century and Baroque galleries. The project included consultation with local audiences and schools and the development of accompanying learning materials.

=== Dulwich Picture Gallery ===
Hillyard joined the Dulwich Picture Gallery in 2015 as Assistant Curator. One of her early projects there was supporting art historian Ellinoor Bergvelt in completing the gallery's first comprehensive catalogue of its Dutch and Flemish paintings, published in 2016. She also supported chief curator Xavier Bray on Making Discoveries, a series of displays examining works attributed to or associated with Anthony van Dyck, Gerrit Dou, Peter Paul Rubens and Rembrandt.

She became Acting Curator in April 2021 and was appointed Curator later that year. In 2020, she contributed to the complete re-presentation of the gallery's collection, described by the institution as its most ambitious rehang since 2013.

Her curatorial work has focused on Dutch and Flemish Old Master painting, storytelling in museum display, and approaches designed to make historic collections accessible and relevant to contemporary audiences.

Hillyard developed Unlocking Paintings, a continuing series inviting artists, researchers and communities to offer new perspectives on the collection. Its first display, True Crime: The Case of Philips Wouwerman in 2022, examined historical allegations that the Dutch painter Philips Wouwerman had appropriated drawings by Pieter van Laer.

At Dulwich, she has described her curation as a form of mediation between the past and the present, inviting new public engagement with the collection. In 2024 she became Head of Collection.

=== Exhibitions ===
Hillyard co-curated the exhibition Rembrandt's Light (2019–2020) with Jennifer Scott and contributed to its accompanying catalogue. The exhibition brought together 35 paintings, drawings and etchings and used lighting developed with cinematographer Peter Suschitzky to explore Rembrandt's use of light as a narrative device. It received extensive critical coverage, including reviews in The Guardian, The Daily Telegraph and The Arts Desk.

In 2025, Hillyard curated Anna Ancher: Painting Light in partnership with Skagens Museum. The exhibition, presenting approximately 40 paintings, was the first solo exhibition in the United Kingdom devoted to the Danish painter Anna Ancher. Hillyard co-authored the accompanying catalogue with Mette Harbo Lehmann of Skagens Museum. The exhibition was reviewed in The Guardian, Apollo, the British Art Journal, The Arts Desk and Studio International.

== Publications ==
- Scott, Jennifer; Hillyard, Helen (2019). Rembrandt's Light. Philip Wilson Publishers. ISBN 9781781300923.
- Hillyard, Helen. “Defining the Hybrid Genre in the Context of Saenredam's Perspectives.” In Büttner, Nils; Ebert-Schifferer, Sybille, eds. (2021). Questioning Pictorial Genres in Dutch Seventeenth-Century Art. Turnhout: Brepols. ISBN 9782503596242..
- Hillyard, Helen. Entries on Willem van de Velde, Jan Both and Jacob Moscher in The Netherlands in the Times of Rembrandt. Warsaw: Royal Castle Museum. 2021..
- Hillyard, Helen; Scott, Jennifer (2024). Unlocking Paintings: A Guide to Historic Art. Dulwich Picture Gallery. ISBN 9781898519515.
- Harbo Lehmann, Mette; Hillyard, Helen (2025). Anna Ancher: Painting Light. London: Dulwich Picture Gallery. ISBN 9781898519546.
