= Jennifer Scott (curator) =

British art historian and museum director (born 1979)

Jennifer Scott (born 1979, Sunderland) is a British art historian, curator, and museum director, who has, since 2017, been director of Dulwich Picture Gallery, having been appointed in December 2016. Scott received a bachelor and masters of arts, in History of Art from The Courtauld Institute of Art, London.

== Career ==
She was previously director of the Holburne Museum in Bath, from 2014-2017, and prior to that, from 2004-2014, curator of paintings at the Royal Collection Trust.

She previously worked at National Gallery and National Museums Liverpool, and is chair of the AFC Wimbledon Foundation; governor of Alleyn's School; fellow of the Society of Antiquaries; and a Fellow Commoner of Lucy Cavendish College, University of Cambridge.

In 2025 she became a trustee of the Auckland Project, which stewards Bishop Auckland.

== Dulwich Picture Gallery ==
At Dulwich Picture Gallery, Scott led a 2025 redevelopment that expanded the Sculpture Garden across three acres, introduced the ArtPlay Pavilion and families’ café, and restored elements of Sir John Soane’s original 1811 design for the museum, including a new Gallery Road entrance. She framed the project as a major step in widening access for children, families, and the local community.

At the gallery, she is particularly interested in opening up the museum to younger visitors, and has through her work, sought to reach new audiences through the educational and curatorial programming.

== Exhibitions ==
She has curated a number of exhibitions including Rembrandt's Light at Dulwich Picture Gallery (2019), Bruegel: Defining a Dynasty at the Holburne Museum (2017); and Dutch Landscapes at the King's Gallery in London and the Bowes Museum, in County Durham.

== Select bibliography ==
- Unlocking Paintings: A guide to historic art (2024)
- Bruegel to Rubens: Masters of Flemish Painting (2007)
- Dutch Landscapes (2010)
- The Royal Portrait: Image and Impact (2010)
- The Northern Renaissance: Durer to Holbein (2011)
- Impressionism: Capturing Life (2016)
- Rembrandt's Light (2019)
