= Christoph Vogtherr =

German art historian (born 1965)

Vogtherr's voice
recorded 2012, as part of an audio description of the Dulwich Picture Gallery for VocalEyes

Christoph Martin Vogtherr (born 1965) is a German art historian. He was director of the Wallace Collection. In January 2016 it was announced that Vogtherr would be leaving the Wallace Collection and would become director of the Hamburger Kunsthalle on 1 October 2016.
