= The Duenna =

1775 comic opera by Thomas Linley

- Comic opera by Thomas Linley and his son
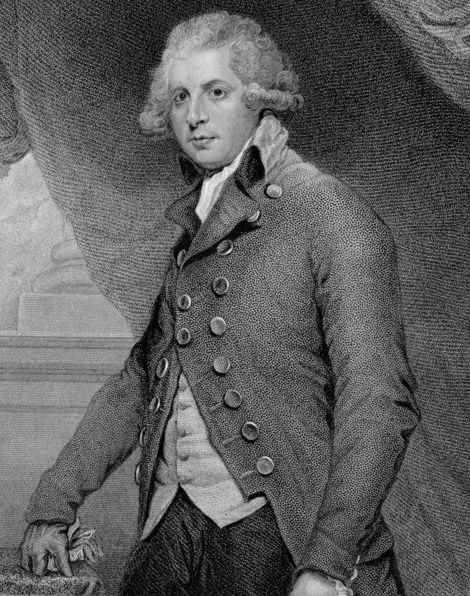
- Richard Brinsley Sheridan, the librettist
- Language: English
- Premiere: 21 November 1775; Covent Garden Theatre, London

The Duenna is a three-act comic opera, mostly composed by Thomas Linley the elder and his son, Thomas Linley the younger, to an English-language libretto by Richard Brinsley Sheridan. At the time, it was considered one of the most successful operas ever staged in England, and its admirers included Samuel Johnson, William Hazlitt and George Byron (the latter called it "the best opera ever written").

First performed in the Covent Garden Theatre on 21 November 1775, The Duenna was performed seventy-five times in its first season, and was frequently revived in Britain until the 1840s. In total, 256 performances of the opera had been held in London from its opening in 1775 to the end of the 18th century. Another 194 performances occurred in the capital during the 19th century, with the last known London staging happening in January 1851 (there were some subsequent Dublin performances in 1853). The opera was first performed in the Colony of Jamaica in 1779, and subsequently spread round the English-speaking world. Soon after its first London performance, representations sprang up in British provincial theatres, though these often used invented dialogue (Sheridan's original libretto was not published until 1794) to link the published songs and musical numbers which had been published in 1775. In autumn 2010, English Touring Opera performed the complete opera in venues around the UK, beginning in the Linbury Studio Theatre within the Royal Opera House as part of ROH2's Autumn season, bringing the opera back to its Covent Garden home. Two modern operas based on Sheridan's libretto have been performed: Sergei Prokofiev's Betrothal in a Monastery (composed 1940–1), and Roberto Gerhard's version of 1945–7.

== The writing of The Duenna ==
=== Background ===
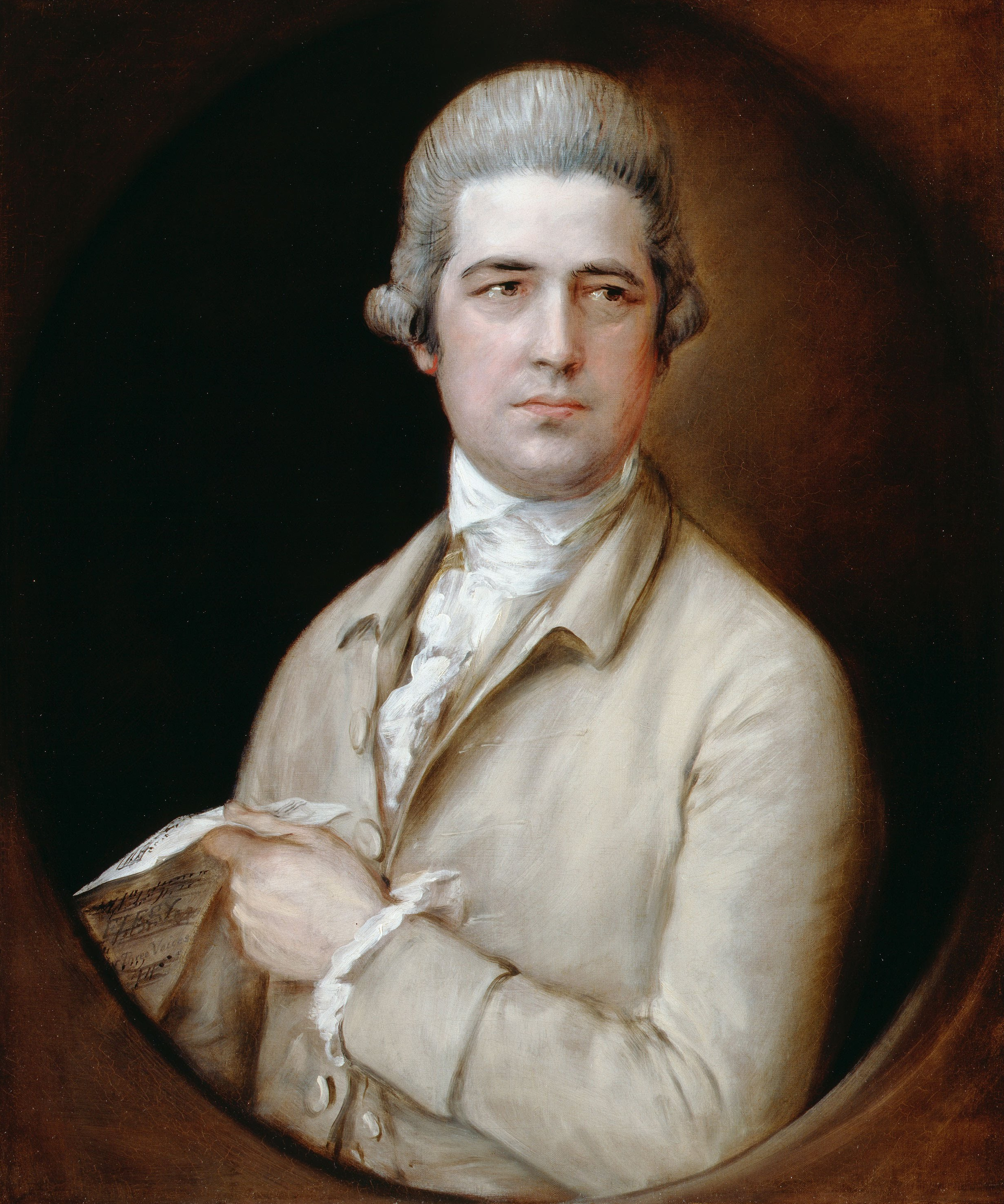
Portrait of Thomas Linley the Elder by Thomas Gainsborough, c. 1770

After the triumph of The Rivals, and having effectively chosen the life of a playwright over that of a lawyer, Sheridan needed a commercial success to cement his position economically and culturally. To do this he skilfully used to his advantage the resources available to him at the time. He judged correctly the popular trend in the last quarter of the 18th century theatre towards operas, pantomime and music.

The Duenna was considered a pastiche opera, though not by choice but as a result of the "extraordinary circumstances in which it was cobbled together." In 1772–73, Sheridan and Elizabeth Linley had a courtship, eventually eloping due to the opposition of their parents towards the relationship. This incident was to later become a major theme in the opera, in the form of Louisa's elopement so she could marry Antonio. After his marriage to Elizabeth Linley in April 1773, their parents eventually relented their opposition to the couple.

Using the musical experience of Elizabeth's father, Thomas Linley the elder, Sheridan asked him to provide music for The Duenna; whilst refraining from telling him about the true nature of the opera or giving him all of the lyrics to it. The remaining lyrics in the opera were written to fit melodies from the Italian operas of that time, as well as some Scottish tunes, such as Michael Arne's The Highland Laddie, made popular in ballad operas. The Scottish tunes were later sent to Linley as they needed harmonising. Linley gave these tunes to his son, Thomas Linley the younger, to harmonise. Linley the younger had proved to be a source of inspiration for his father when creating music for the opera. Illustrating his disdain for Sheridan's decision to incorporate parts of other operas in The Duenna, Thomas Linley the elder wrote to David Garrick:

My son has likewise written some tunes for him . . . This is a mode of proceeding I by no means approve of. I think he ought first to have finished his opera with the songs he intends to introduce in it, and then have got it entirely new set. No musician can set a song properly unless he understands the character,-and knows the performer who is to exhibit it.

=== Influence of the plot and characters ===
The basics of the plot of The Duenna originate in the tradition of Spanish honour dramas and the play includes many features of the genre. Its nearest predecessors are John Fletcher's The Chances and Sir Samuel Tuke's The Adventures of Five Hours. However, for the benefit of the polite 18th-century audience, Sheridan left out the risqué situations of the previous honour dramas, so that when Louisa escapes from her father's house, the street is not the dangerous place her father has threatened her with. It is, in fact, very safe.

Sheridan's personal life also provided models for the plot and characters, as was also the case in The Rivals. Louisa is a sketch of Elizabeth Linley/Sheridan; both have beautiful voices, both are forced by their fathers into marrying wealthy men whom they detest, and both flee to convents to avoid those marriages. The quarrelling of Ferdinand and Antonio can also be traced to the brotherly quarrelling of Richard and Charles Sheridan contemporary to the writing of The Duenna.

=== The songs ===
The songs in The Duenna were among the fundamental reasons for its success. While it does owe its heritage to the ballad opera of the 1720s (John Gay's The Beggar's Opera being the most famous example) the songs in The Duenna were more technically complex and required trained singers in the lead roles. The musical score was a combination of successful works by other composers, traditional ballads and new compositions. About half of the pieces are new, composed by Linley the elder and (mainly) by Linley the younger. Editions of the vocal score were published but a complete orchestral score was never printed. Nevertheless, about half the numbers survive in manuscript full score (numbers 1, 3, 5, 11, 16, 21–26, 28–29), printed parts (the overture, by Linley the younger) and published full score (the borrowed numbers 6, 18, 24). The original scoring of the remaining numbers in this most popular opera may never be heard again, though they were orchestrated for the English Touring Opera performances in 2010.

Act 1

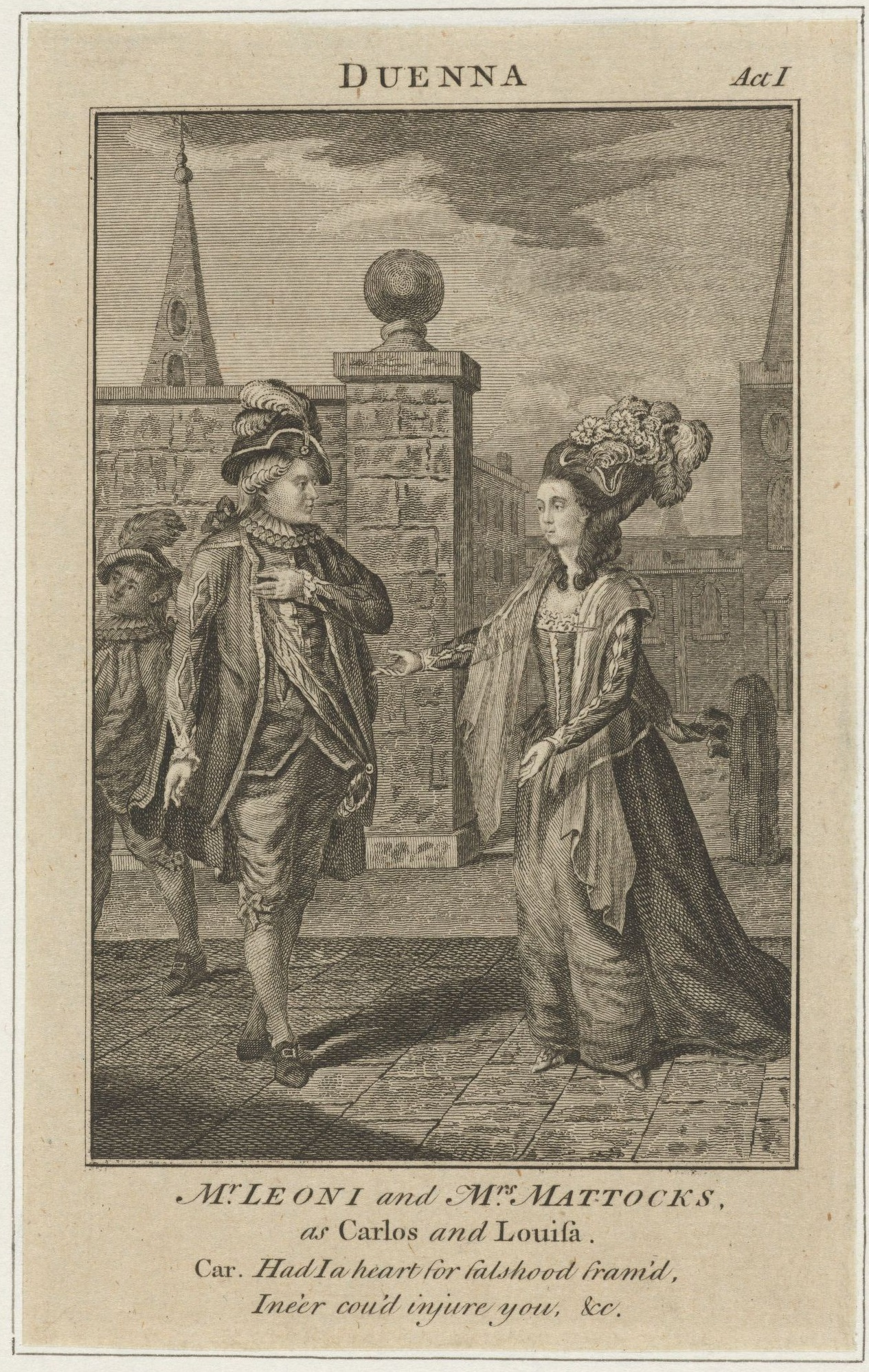
Illustration for the song Had I a heart for falsehood fram'd

1. Song (Antonio): Tell me, my lute, can thy soft strain
2. Trio (Antonio, Louisa, Don Jerome): The breath of morn bids hence the night
3. Air (Ferdinand): Could I her faults remember
4. Air (Antonio): I ne'er could any lustre see
5. Air (Antonio): Friendship is the bond of reason
6. Air (Ferdinand): Tho' cause for suspicion appears
7. Air (Louisa): Thou canst not boast of fortune's store
8. Air (Don Jerome): If a daughter you have, she's the plague of your life
9. Air (Clara): When sable night, each drooping plant restoring
10. Air (Carlos): Had I a heart for falsehood fram'd
11. Trio (Isaac, Louisa and Carlos): My mistress expects me

Act 2

12. Song (Isaac): Give Isaac the nymph who no beauty can boast
13. Song (Don Jerome): When the maid whom we love
14. Song (Duenna): When a tender maid is first essay'd
15. Song (Carlos): Ah! sure a pair was never seen
16. Duet (Isaac, Don Jerome): Believe me, good sir
17. Glee (Jerome, Ferdinand and Isaac): A bumper of good liquor
18. Air (Louisa): What Bard, O Time, discover
19. Song (Carlos): O, had my love ne'er smil'd on me
20. Trio (Antonio, Carlos, Louisa): Soft pity never leaves the gentle breast

Act 3

21. Song (Don Jerome): O, the days when I was young
22. Air (Ferdinand): Ah! Cruel maid, how hast thou chang'd
23. Recit. Accomp. & Air (Ferdinand): Shall not my soul?/Sharp is the woe
24. Air (Clara): By him we love offended
25. Song (Antonio): How oft, Louisa, hast thou told
26. Air (Clara): Adieu, thou dreary pile
27. Glee and Chorus (Father Paul, Francis, Augustine, and Friars): This bottle's the sun of our table
28. Duet (Louisa and Clara): Turn thee round, I pray thee
29. Chorus: Oft does Hymen smile to hear
30. Final ensemble (Jerome, Louisa, Ferdinand, Antonio, Clara): Come now for jest and smiling

=== Writing for the talent ===
Sheridan wrote many of the roles in The Duenna to match a specific performer's ability, tailoring the text to the capacities of the singer. For example, Michael Leoni was cast for the role of Don Carlos, but his heavy German-Jewish accent meant that he could not deliver long lines of dialogue. To counter this problem Don Carlos's speeches were cut and his dialogues turned into duets and trios. John Quick, who had proved himself as a great actor of Sheridan's comic characters as Bob Acres in The Rivals and Doctor Rosy in St Patrick's Day, was given the part of the equally ridiculous Isaac Mendoza; Mrs. Green, the original Mrs Malaprop, was given the role of the duenna.

=== Textual corruption ===
In his Reminiscences, Michael Kelly tells the story that in 1807 he was appearing in The Duenna at Drury Lane, as Ferdinand. One morning he went out for a ride, and returned home to find Sheridan with pen and ink correcting his printed copy of the dialogue. 'Do you act the part of Ferdinand from this printed copy?' asked Sheridan. Kelly replied that he had done so for 20 years. 'Then you have been acting great nonsense,' came the reply, and Sheridan went through correcting every sentence. Kelly adds, 'What could prove his negligence more than correcting an opera which he had written in 1775 in the year 1807; and then, for the first time, examining it and abusing the manner in which it was printed?'

== Roles ==
The scene is Seville.

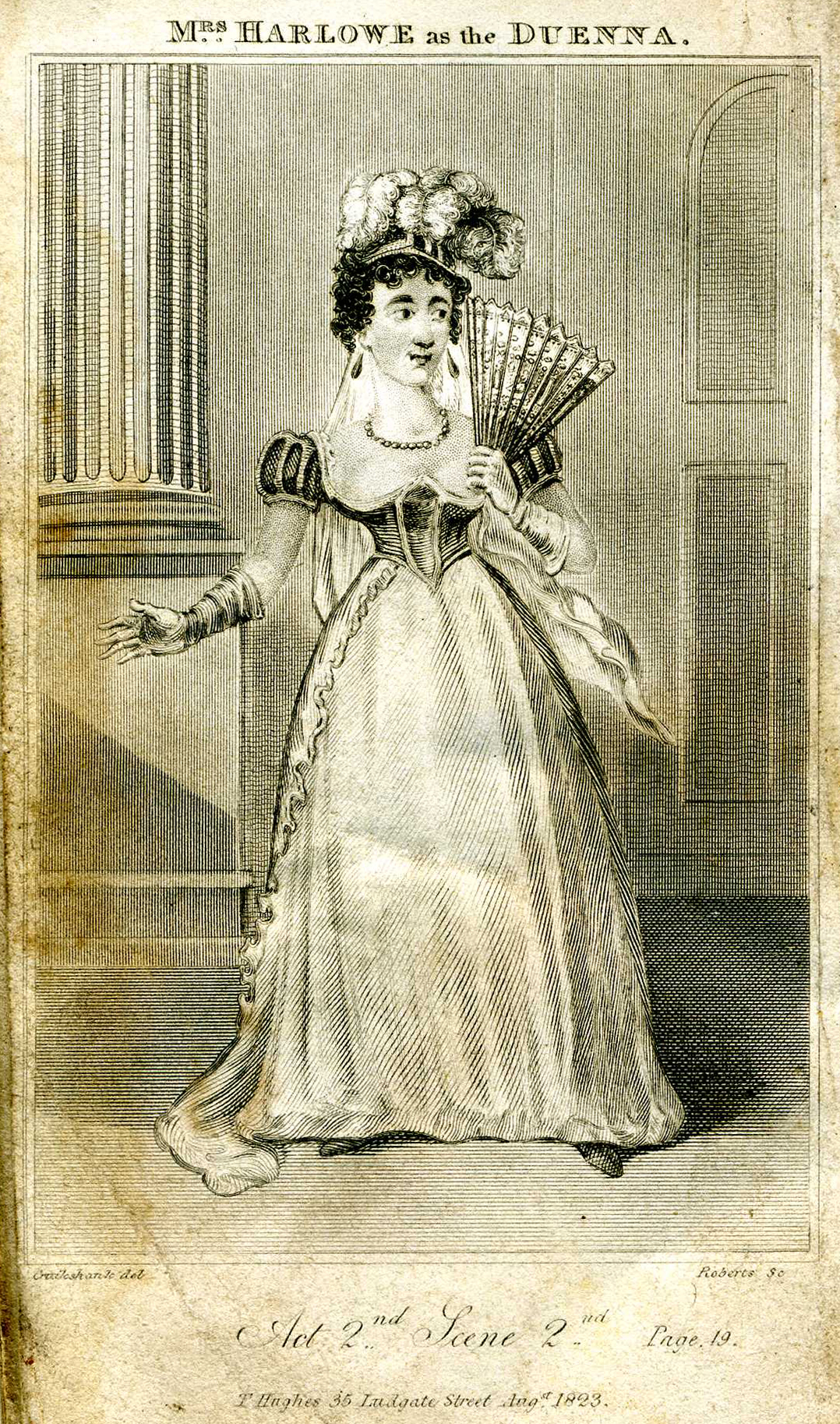
The actress Mrs Harlowe as The Duenna, depicted by George Cruikshank in an engraving published 1823.

		Premiere 21 November 1775	Revival December 1924
Don Jerome	baritone	Richard Wilson	Nigel Playfair
Donna Louisa, his daughter	soprano	Mrs. Mattocks	Elsa Macfarlane
Don Ferdinand, his son	tenor	George Mattocks	Michael Cole
Isaac Mendoza, a rich Jewish merchant	tenor	John Quick	Frank Cochrane
Don Carlos		Michael Leoni	Guy Lefeuvre tenor
Lady Margaret, Louisa's duenna	mezzo-soprano	Mrs Green	Elsie French
Donna Clara	soprano	Mrs. Cargill (née Brown)	Isobel McLaren
Don Antonio	tenor	Mr. Dubellamy	Denys Erlam
Father Paul	tenor	Robert Mahon	Frederick Carlton
Father Francis		Mr. Fox	
Father Augustine		Mr. Baker	
Lopez, Ferdinand's manservant		Mr. Wewitzer	Alfred Harris
Maids, servants, friars and masqueraders			

== Plot ==
The play is set in Seville, and centres on the family of the wealthy Don Jerome. His son, Don Ferdinand, is in love with Donna Clara, whose cruel father is set upon forcing her into a nunnery—the nearby convent of St Catherine. In desperation, Don Ferdinand bribes her maid to admit him to her bedchamber at dead of night, to beg her to run away with him, but she indignantly refuses – but keeps the duplicate key he has made, and runs away by herself on the morrow.

Meanwhile, Don Ferdinand's sister Donna Louisa is in love with the poor but gallant Don Antonio. Her avaricious father Don Jerome wants to marry her to the equally avaricious and cunning Isaac Mendoza, who through his inordinate fondness for overreaching whosoever he has to do, is generally as much a fool as a knave, and is thus the dupe of his own art, as Donna Louisa tells her father.

== Stage history ==
The Duenna was first performed on 21 November 1775 at Covent Garden Theatre, London. The play catered to the reputation of the Covent Garden Theatre as the home of low comedy, the comedy of the jape, the leer and the pratfall. However, Covent Garden was also the traditional home of opera and musical entertainment, being built with the original profits from Gay's The Beggar's Opera (Covent Garden Theatre is now called the Royal Opera House). The opera was an immediate hit, with 75 performances in its first season and a total of 254 performances at Covent Garden alone in the 25 years between its opening and the end of the eighteenth century.

Interest in The Duenna was renewed in the early 20th century with performances at the Maddermarket Theatre, Norwich in 1923, and by Sir Barry Jackson at Birmingham soon after: and a further revival was advocated by Lovat Fraser, designer of the scenery and dresses for Frederic Austin's restoration of The Beggar's Opera at Hammersmith with Nigel Playfair in 1920–23. Playfair took up the challenge with George Sheringham as his designer of costumes and scenery, in a production with the music reharmonised, and in some cases rewritten, at the Lyric Theatre, Hammersmith in December 1924. The full text (without music) and designs (in colour plates) were published as a book with a foreword by Playfair in 1925.

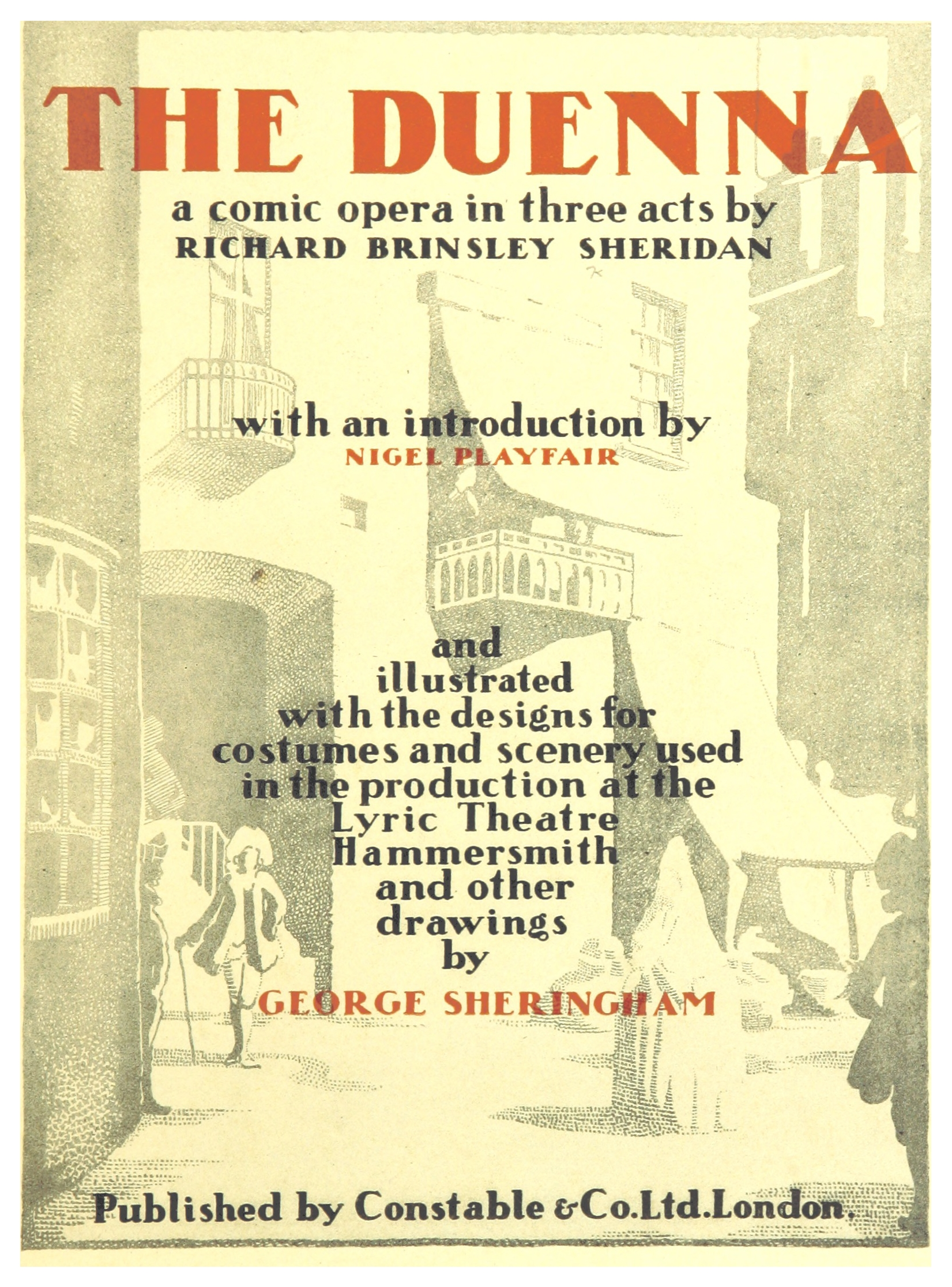

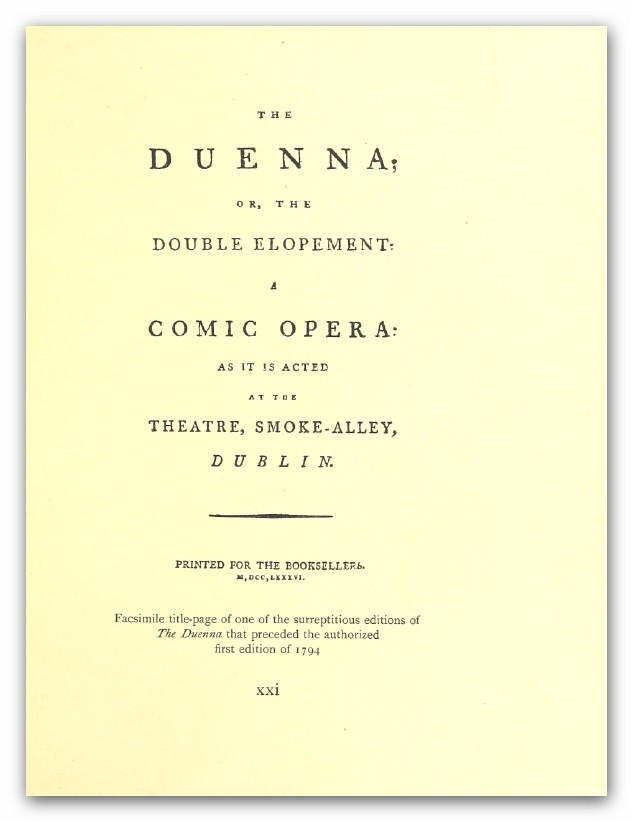

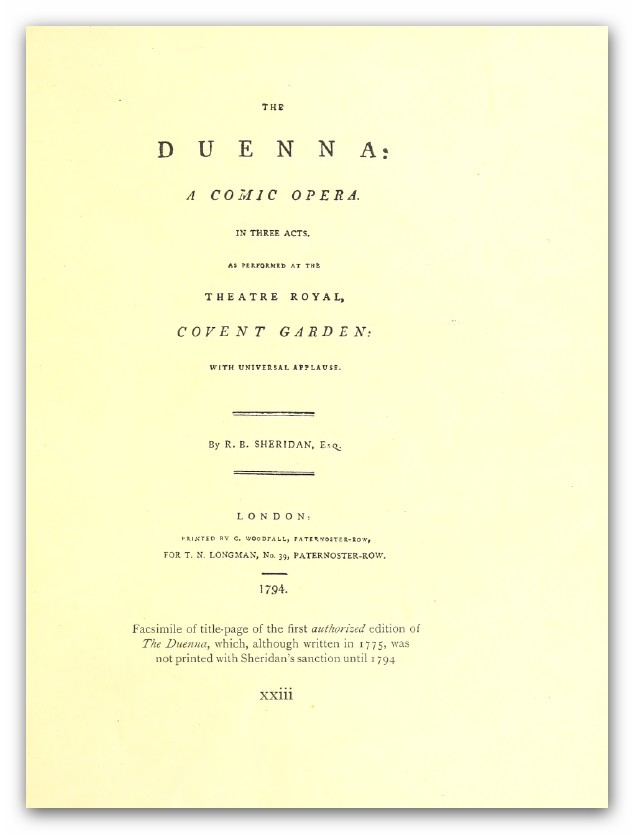

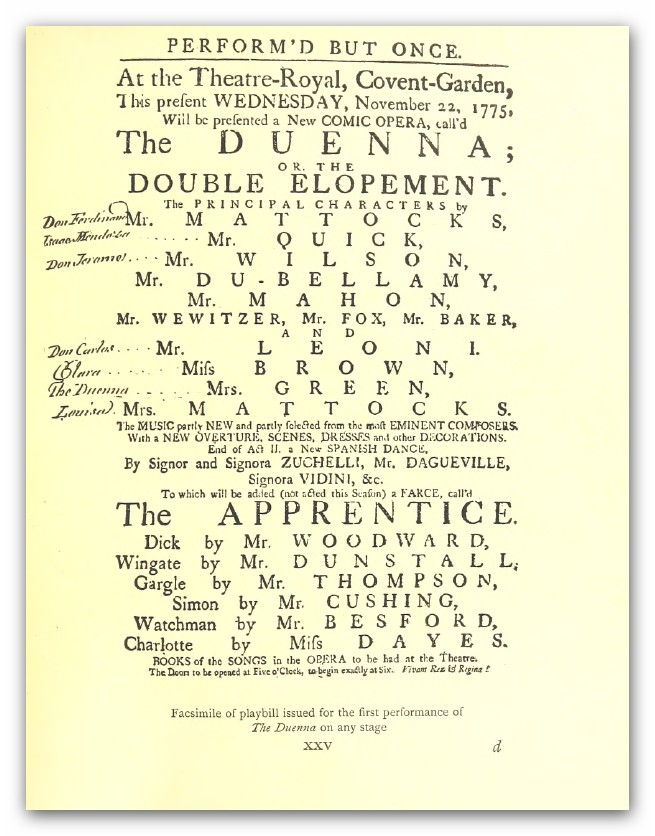

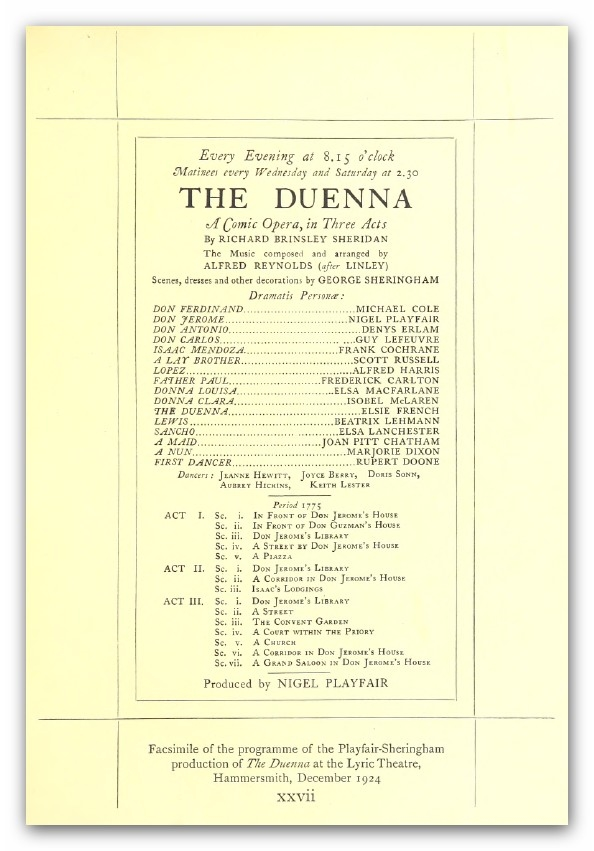

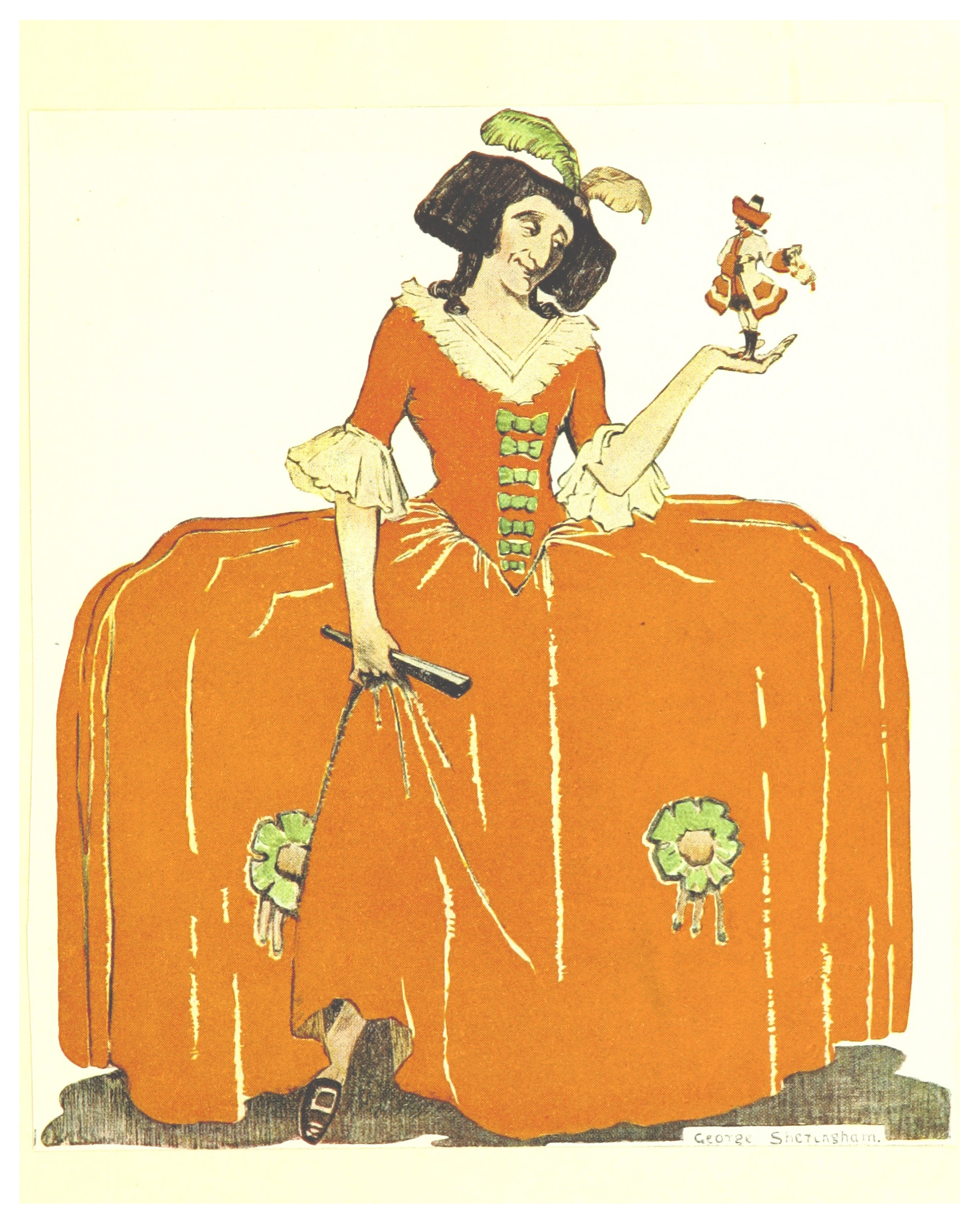
The Duenna

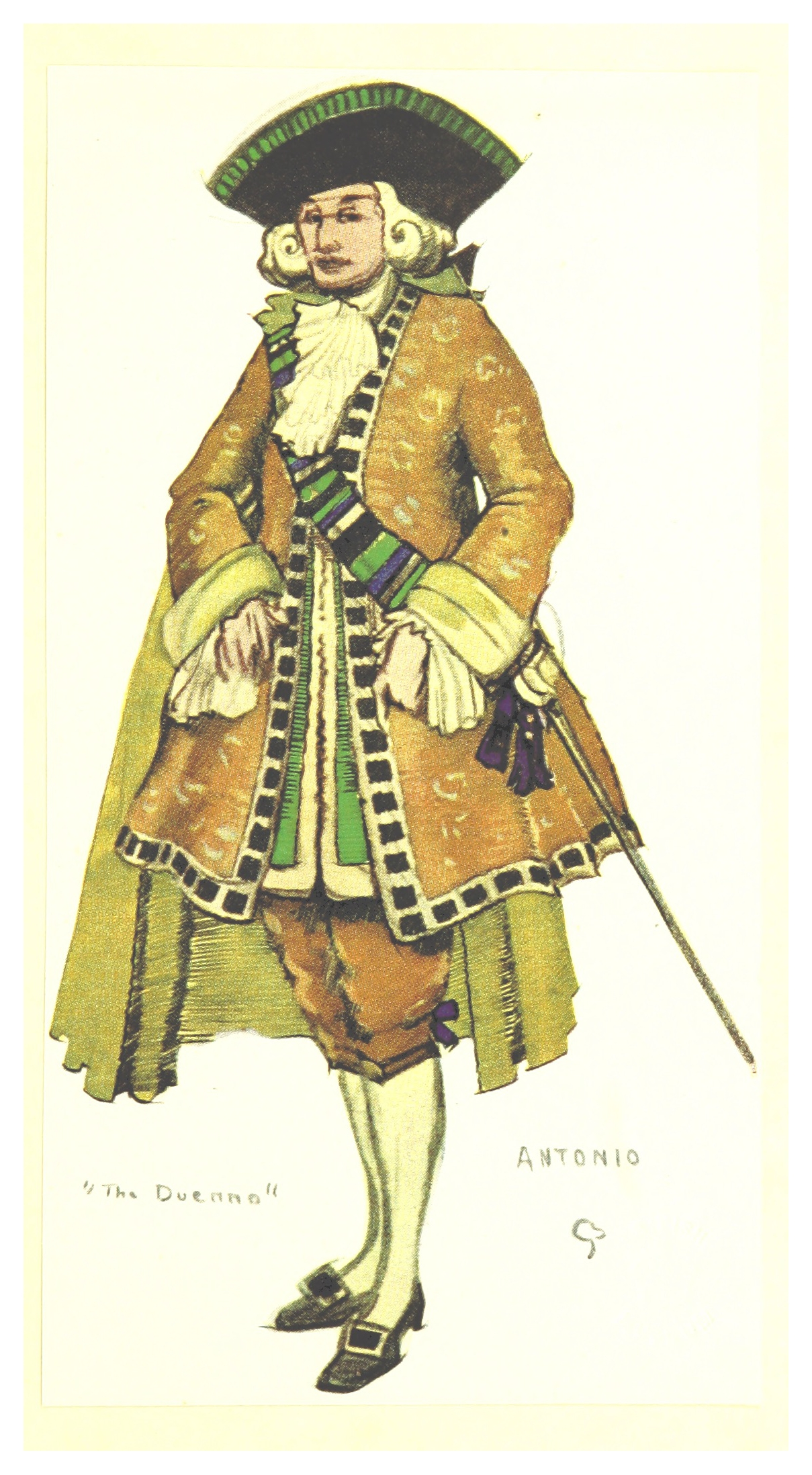
Don Antonio

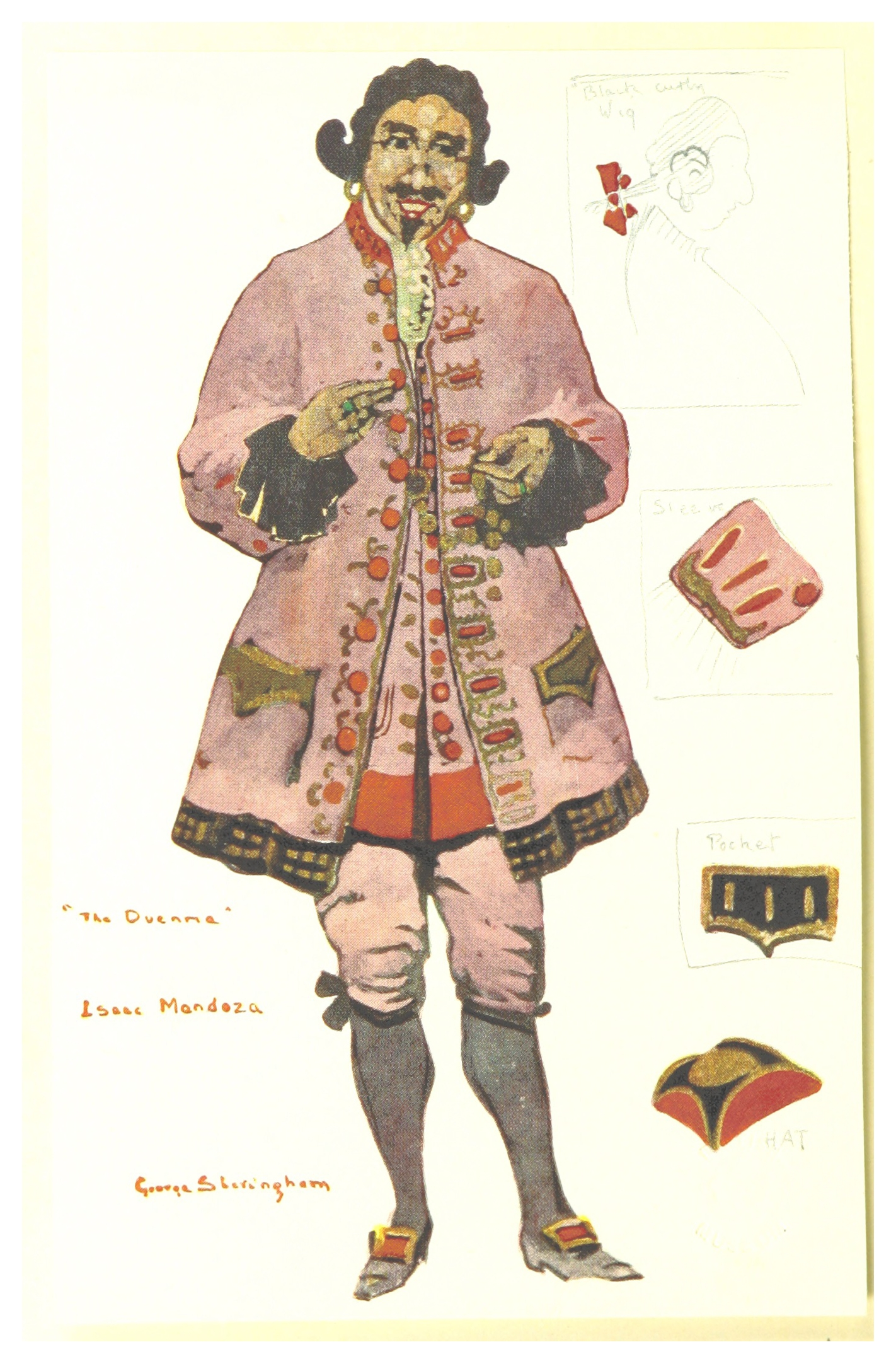
Mendoza

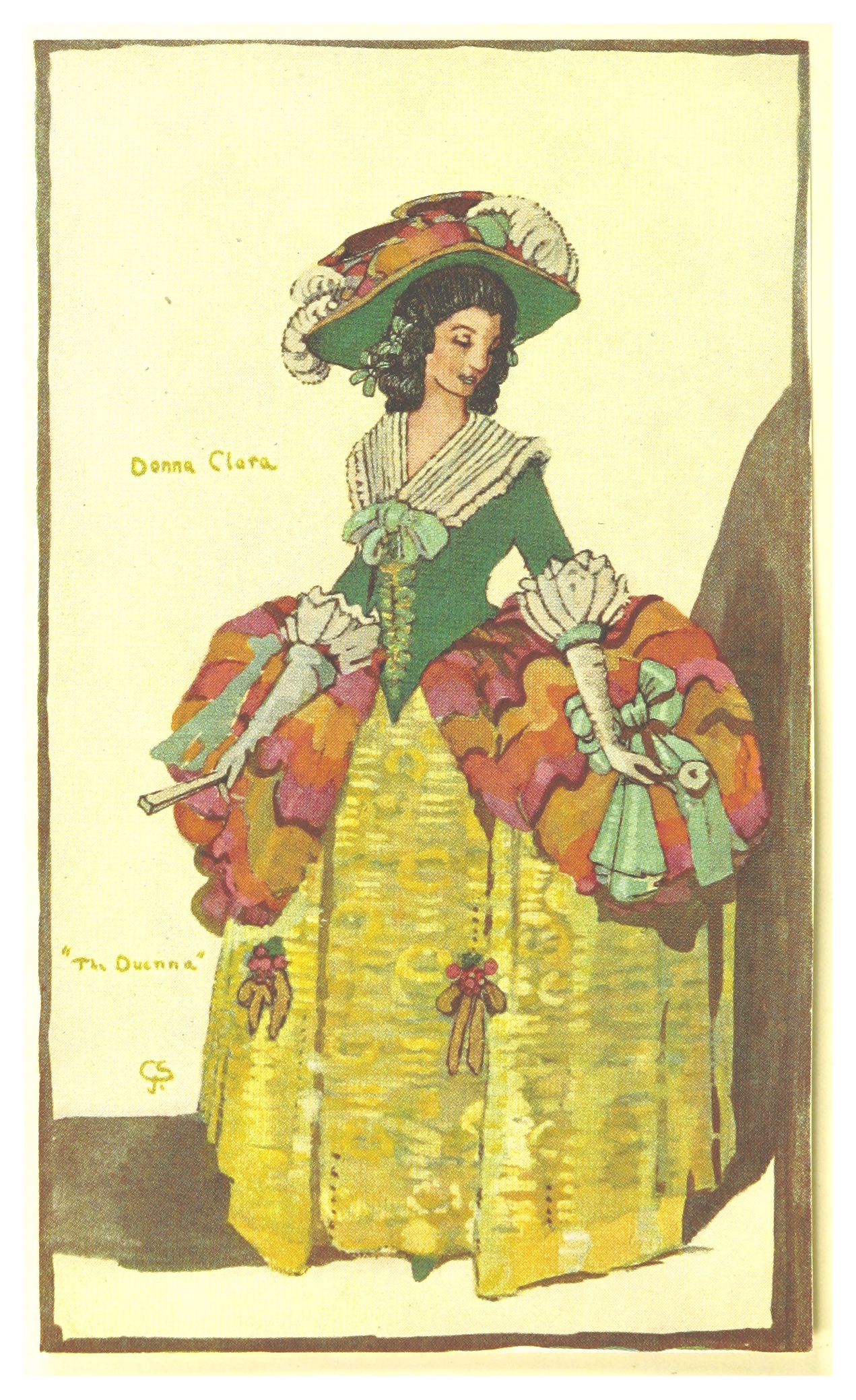
Donna Clara

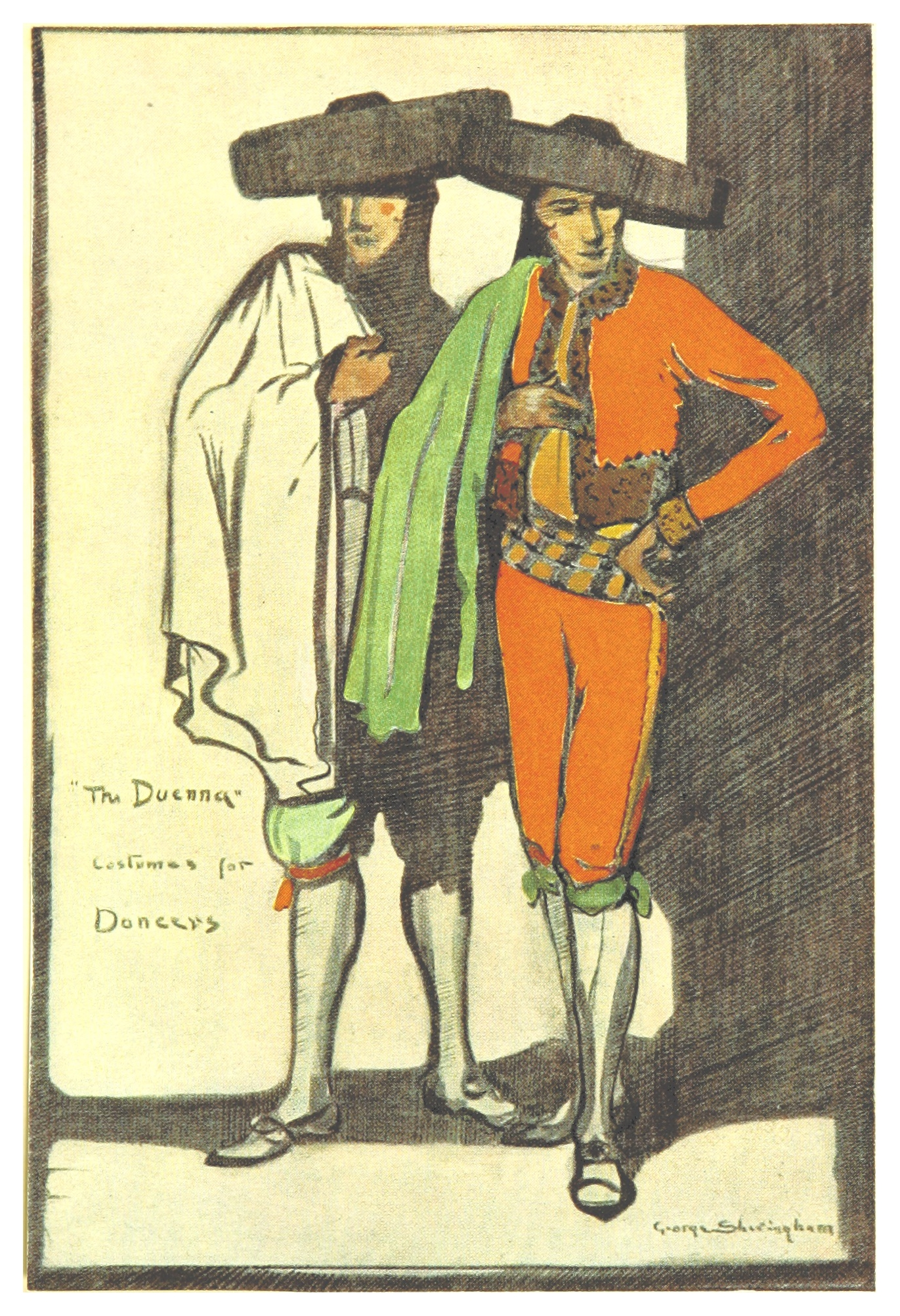
Dancers

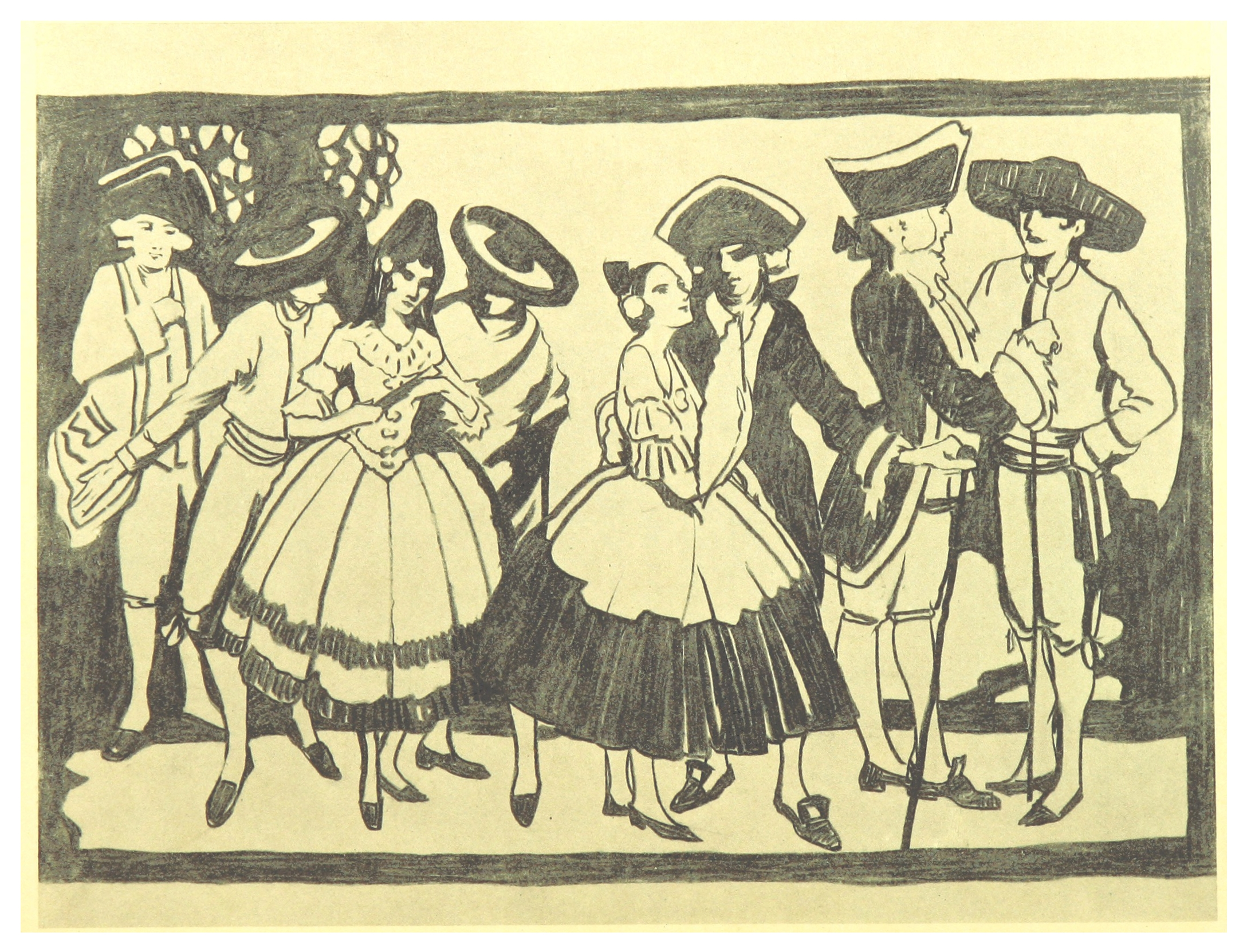
Dance scene

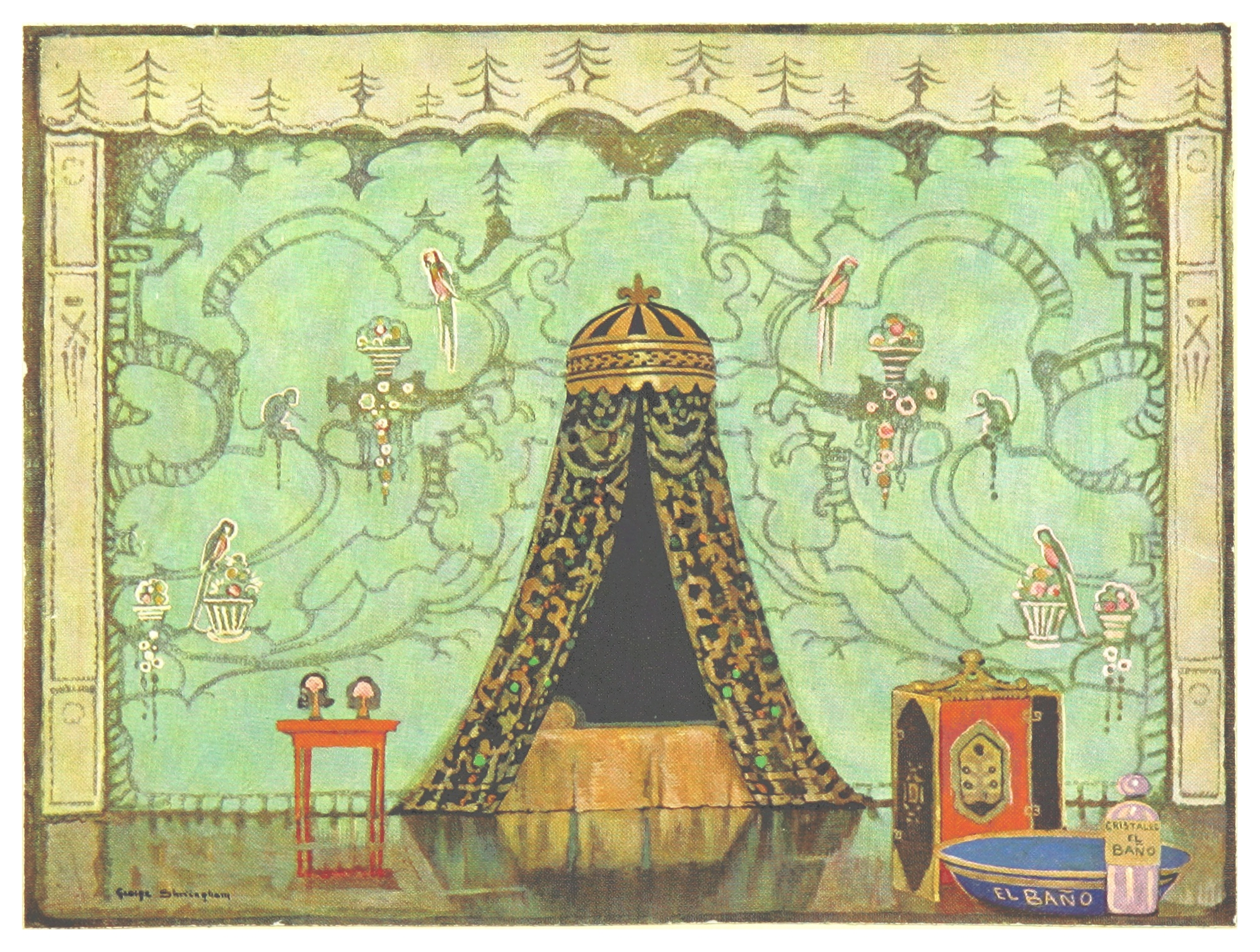
Stage design

=== Adaptations ===
In 1964, a live performance adapted for radio by Peter Bryant was given at the Camden Theatre in London and broadcast on the BBC Home Service. Don Antonio was played by Denis Quilley and Donna Louisa by Jane Wenham, and original music was composed by Julian Slade. It was rebroadast in 2024 by BBC Radio 4 Extra as part of the station's Home Service Day. A version of this had been previously performed as The Gay Chaperone with music by Slade in London and Toronto.

=== Modern reworkings ===
The Duenna has two modern reworkings that use the storyline of the opera but not the original music. The first is by Sergei Prokofiev in 1940 (first performed in 1946 owing to the Second World War) – Prokofiev changes the name of the play to Betrothal in a Monastery. The second is The Duenna by the Spanish Catalan exile Roberto Gerhard in 1947–49.

== See also ==
- Betrothal in a Monastery – Russian XX century opera by Sergey Prokofiev to the same libretto.
