= Thomas Linley =

Thomas Linley may refer to:

- Thomas Linley the elder (1733–1795), English composer and conductor
- Thomas Linley the younger (1756–1778), his son, a violinist, composer and friend of Mozart
