= Portrait of Thomas Linley the Elder =

Painting by Thomas Gainsborough

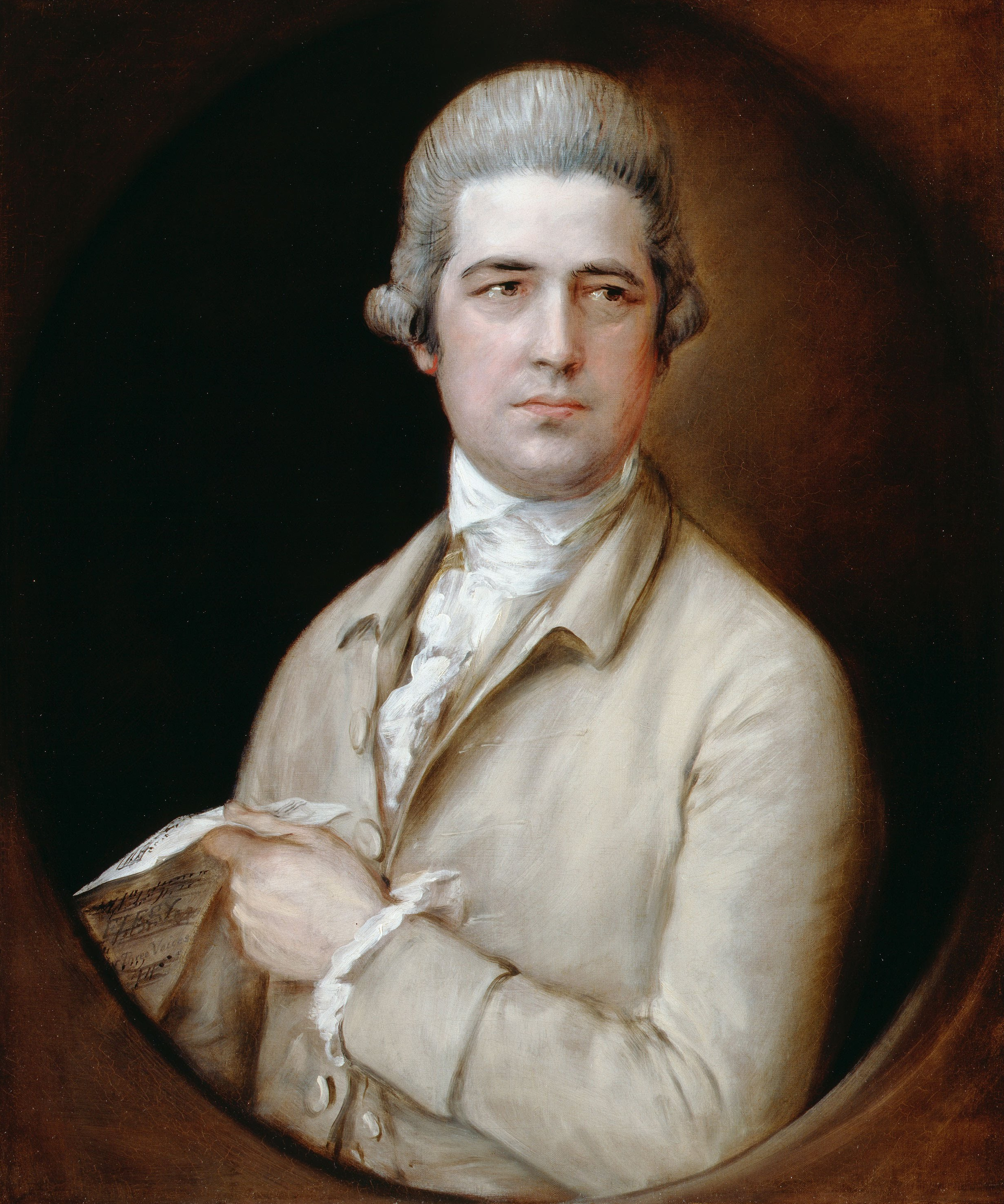
- Artist: Thomas Gainsborough
- Year: c. 1770
- Type: Oil on canvas, portrait painting
- Dimensions: 76.5 cm × 63.5= cm (30.1 in ×)
- Location: Dulwich Picture Gallery, London

Portrait of Thomas Linley the Elder is an oil on canvas portrait painting by the English artist Thomas Gainsborough , from c. 1770. It depicts the English musician Thomas Linley the Elder.

Linley was a musical leader in Bath and was noted for his musical family who often performed together. He later became musical director and a co-owner of the Theatre Royal, Drury Lane with his son-in-law Richard Brinsley Sheridan. He was a friend of the artists who produced several depictions of his children, including The Linley Sisters. In reference to his profession, Linley is shown holding sheet music, as he looks to the right side.

Gainsborough also produced a noted portrait of his son Thomas Linley the Younger, c. 1772. Today both paintings are in the collection of the Dulwich Picture Gallery, in London, having been part of the bequest of William Linley.

== See also ==
- Portrait of Thomas Linley the Younger, a 1772 painting by Gainsborough

== Bibliography ==
- Hamilton, James. Gainsborough: A Portrait. Hachette UK, 2017.
- Perry, Gillian. Spectacular Flirtations: Viewing the Actress in British Art and Theatre, 1768-1820. Yale University Press, 2007.
- Sloman, Susan & Fawcett, Trevor. Pickpocketing the Rich: Portrait Painting in Bath, 1720-1800. Holbourne Museum of Art, 2002.
