= Portrait of Thomas Linley the Younger =

Painting by Thomas Gainsborough

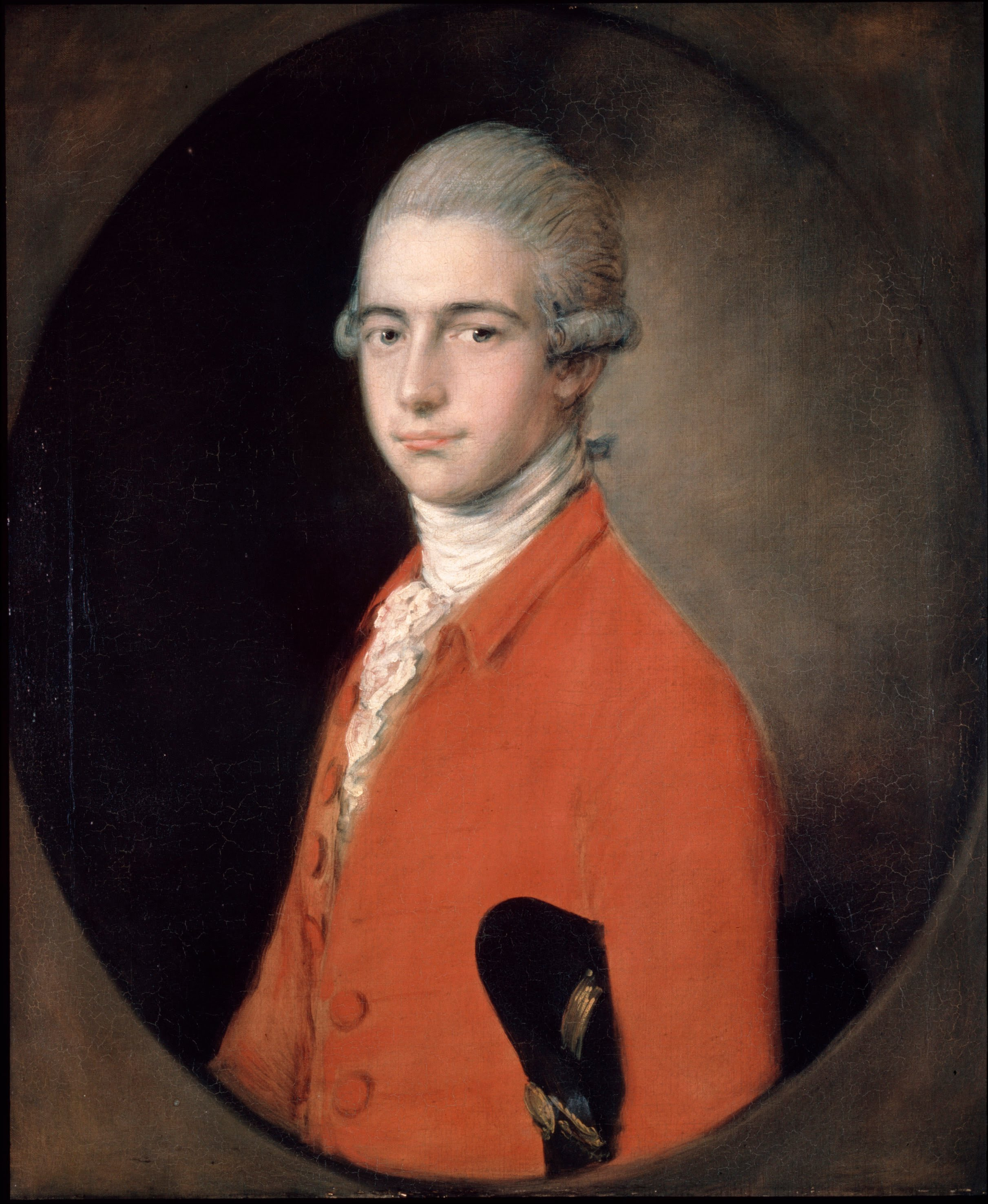
- Artist: Thomas Gainsborough
- Year: c. 1772
- Type: Oil on canvas, portrait painting
- Dimensions: 75.9 cm × 63.5 cm (29.9 in × 25.0 in)
- Location: Dulwich Picture Gallery, London

Portrait of Thomas Linley the Younger is an oil on canvas portrait painting by the English artist Thomas Gainsborough, from c. 1772. It depicts the English musician and composer Thomas Linley the Younger, part of the Bath-based Linley Musical Family.

Due to his youthful talent and friendship with Wolfgang Amadeus Mozart, whom he met while studying in Florence, he was later dubbed the "English Mozart". Linley drowned three months after his 22nd birthday during a boating accident in Lincolnshire, in 1778.

At the time of the painting, Gainsborough was based in Bath, and was on friendly terms with the Linley family. His painting The Linley Sisters was displayed at the Royal Academy Exhibition of 1772.

Today the painting is in the Dulwich Picture Gallery, in London, having been part of the bequest of William Linley, in 1835.

== See also ==
- Portrait of Thomas Linley the Elder, a 1770 painting by Gainsborough

== Bibliography ==
- Hamilton, James. Gainsborough: A Portrait. Hachette UK, 2017.
- Ingamells, John. Dulwich Picture Gallery: British. Unicorn Press, 2019.
- Perry, Gillian. Spectacular Flirtations: Viewing the Actress in British Art and Theatre, 1768-1820. Yale University Press, 2007.
- Sloman, Susan & Fawcett, Trevor. Pickpocketing the Rich: Portrait Painting in Bath, 1720-1800. Holbourne Museum of Art, 2002.
