= Thomas Linley the Younger =

English composer and violinist (1756–1778)

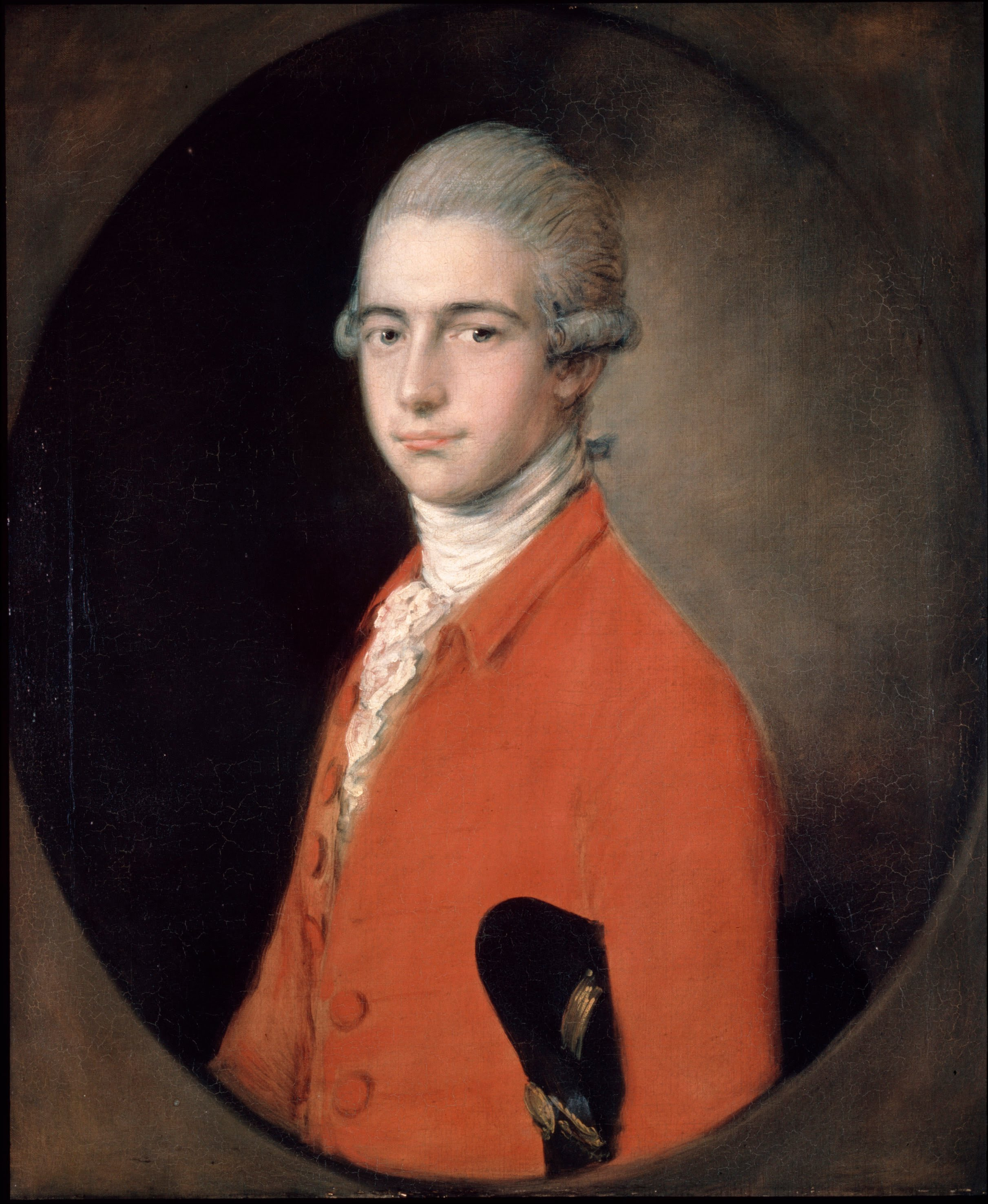
- Portrait of Thomas Linley the Younger by Thomas Gainsborough, c. 1772
- Born: 7 May 1756; Abbey Green, Bath, England
- Died: 5 August 1778 (aged 22); Grimsthorpe Castle, Lincolnshire
- Occupations: Composer; Violinist
- Parent(s): Thomas Linley; Mary Johnson
- Relatives: Elizabeth Ann (sister); Mary (sister); Samuel (brother); Maria (sister); Ozias Thurston (brother); Jane (sister); William (brother)

Thomas Linley the Younger (7 May 1756 – 5 August 1778), also known as Thomas Linley Jr was the eldest son of the composer Thomas Linley and his wife Mary Johnson. He was considered one of the most precocious composers and performers known in England. A highly talented violinist, he started his performance career at the age of seven in Bath, and often appeared alongside his musical siblings. Linley was described as the most promising of all native English composers between Henry Purcell and Edward Elgar, combining prodigious talent with a delightful personality. He was sometimes referred to as the "English Mozart". His early promise was cut short when he drowned in a boating accident, aged just 22 years.

== Early life ==
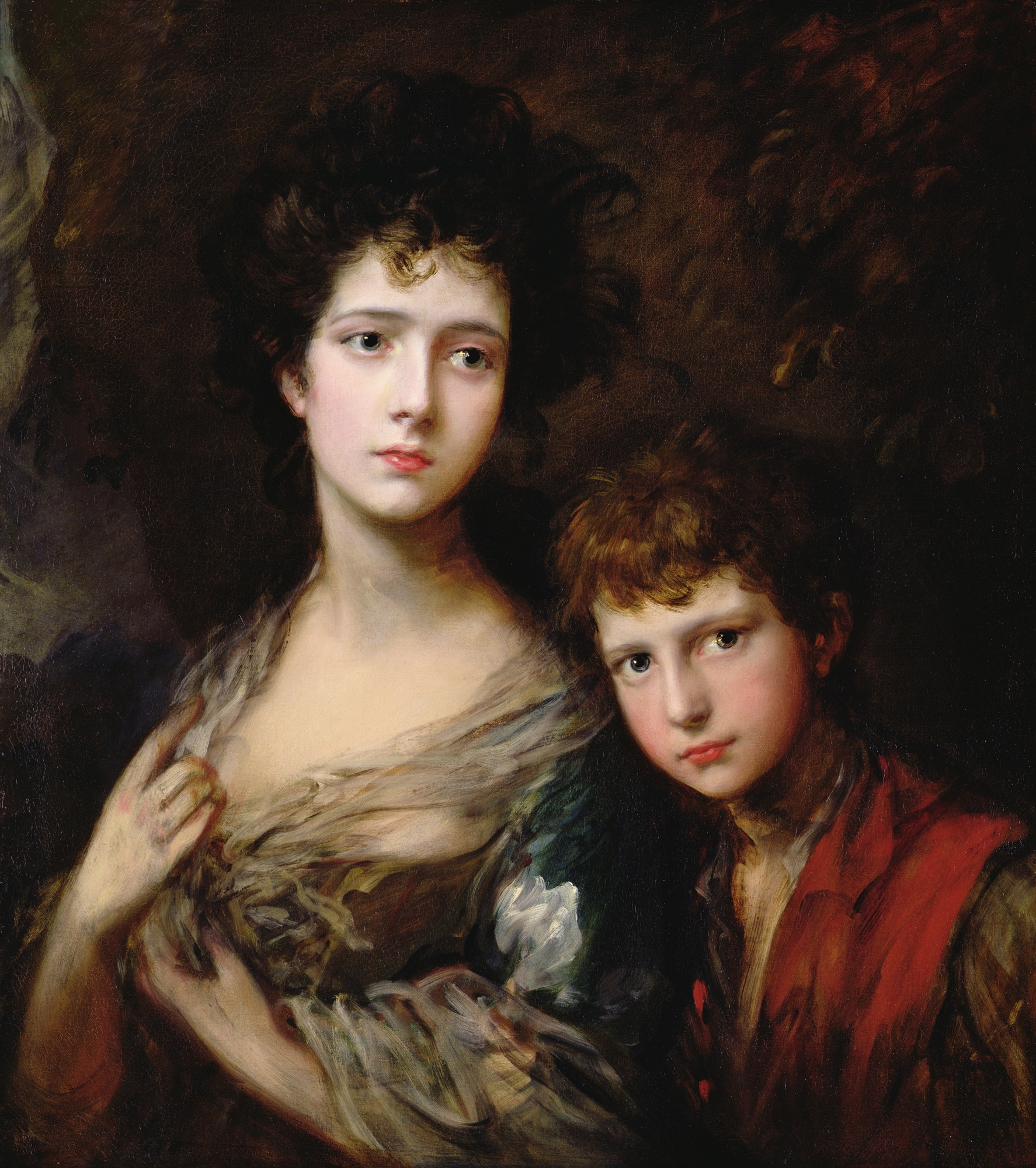
Elizabeth (14 y. old) with Thomas (12) by Gainsborough, c. 1768

Outside London, Bath was the most fashionable city in late 18th-century England, and in Bath, the Linleys were the most influential musical family. Originally from Gloucestershire and from a modest background (Linley's grandfather was a carpenter/builder whose business flourished thanks to Bath's urban development), the Linleys quickly became prominent among the community of musicians providing entertainment to the wealthy tenants of the elegant city. Charles Burney famously described them as "a Nest of Nightingales".

Thomas Linley was born into this family on 7 May 1756. Linley's father, Thomas Linley the Elder, who worked as a music and singing teacher, would take over the management of the musical performances at the Assembly rooms in Bath in 1766 and would become musical director of the New Bath Assembly Rooms in 1771. He put his children, whose musical education he supervised, to work. In 1762, Linley and his sister Elizabeth Ann were selling tickets to concerts and soon after, as early as 1763, they were performing in front of full houses with their other siblings. Anything earned by the children was commandeered by Linley the elder and the talented youngsters became a major source of income, allowing the family to raise their social standing.

Linley's sisters, Elizabeth Ann (born 1754), Mary (born 1758) and Maria (born 1763), were accomplished singers and actresses. His brother Samuel (born 1760) was a talented oboist before becoming a sailor. His youngest brother, William (born 1771), would also be a musician and later a composer.

The abilities of Linley Jr were apparent from a very young age, and he played a violin concerto at a concert in Bristol on 29 July 1763 at the age of only 7. The Bath Journal thus advertised it on 25 July 1763:

For the Benefit of Mr. Linley. At Loggan's Room at the Hot Wells on the 29th Inſt. Will be perform'd A Concert of Vocal and Instrumental Music. The Vocal Parts by Mr. Linley, Mr. Higgins and Maſter Linley. The Firſt Violin by Mr Richards of Bath. End of the Iſt Act a Concerto on the Violin by Maſter Linley, a child of ſeven years old. End of the 2nd Act an Elegy of Jackson's by Mr. and Maſter Linley and Mr. Higgins

The youngster started to compose soon after. William Boyce, Master of the King's Musick at the time, took him under his wing and Linley studied with him from 1763 to 1768.

From then on, their father always asking for higher fees for them, the siblings appeared further afield, notably in charity concerts and oratorios, including in London.

In 1767, Linley appeared at Covent Garden, along with his sister Elizabeth, in Thomas Hull's The Fairy Favour, a masque written for the entertainment of the four-year-old Prince of Wales, in which Linley sang the part of Puck, danced a hornpipe and played the violin. He must have made quite an impression, as the Lloyds Evening Post of 3 February 1767 said of his performance that "[not] enough [could] be said of the little boy [whose] singing, playing on the violin, and dancing [...were] all beyond expectation, and discover extraordinary abilities in one, who must be considered a child".

In May 1768, the famous portrait painter Thomas Gainsborough reported in a letter to William Jackson that "Tommy Linley [was] bound for Italy at the first opportunity".

== Journey to Italy ==
Between 1768 and 1771, Linley journeyed to Italy to further study the violin and composition with Pietro Nardini in Florence. The Tenor Michael Kelly recounts in his Reminiscenses how 10 years later, when he met Nardini, the latter "spoke with great affection of his favourite scholar, Thomas Linley, who, he said, possessed powerful abilities".

In Florence, Linley met Wolfgang Amadeus Mozart in April 1770 and Charles Burney in September of the same year. Burney later wrote, "The Tommasino, as he is called, and the little Mozart, are talked of all over Italy as the most promising geniuses of this age." Linley and Mozart, both of them 14-year-old teenagers, formed a close friendship making and playing music together, so much so that, as is explained by Robert Gutman, their separation when Mozart left for Rome was a difficult moment for them both, with "a melancholy Thomas follow[ing] the Mozarts' coach as they departed […]" They would never meet again.

About Linley, "der kleine Tomaso", Leopold Mozart writes in one of his letters to his daughter Anna Maria, that he is "ein allerliebster Knab [...] welcher wunderschön spielt" (a very dear boy [...] who plays beautifully). He thus details the whole episode between Linley and Mozart:

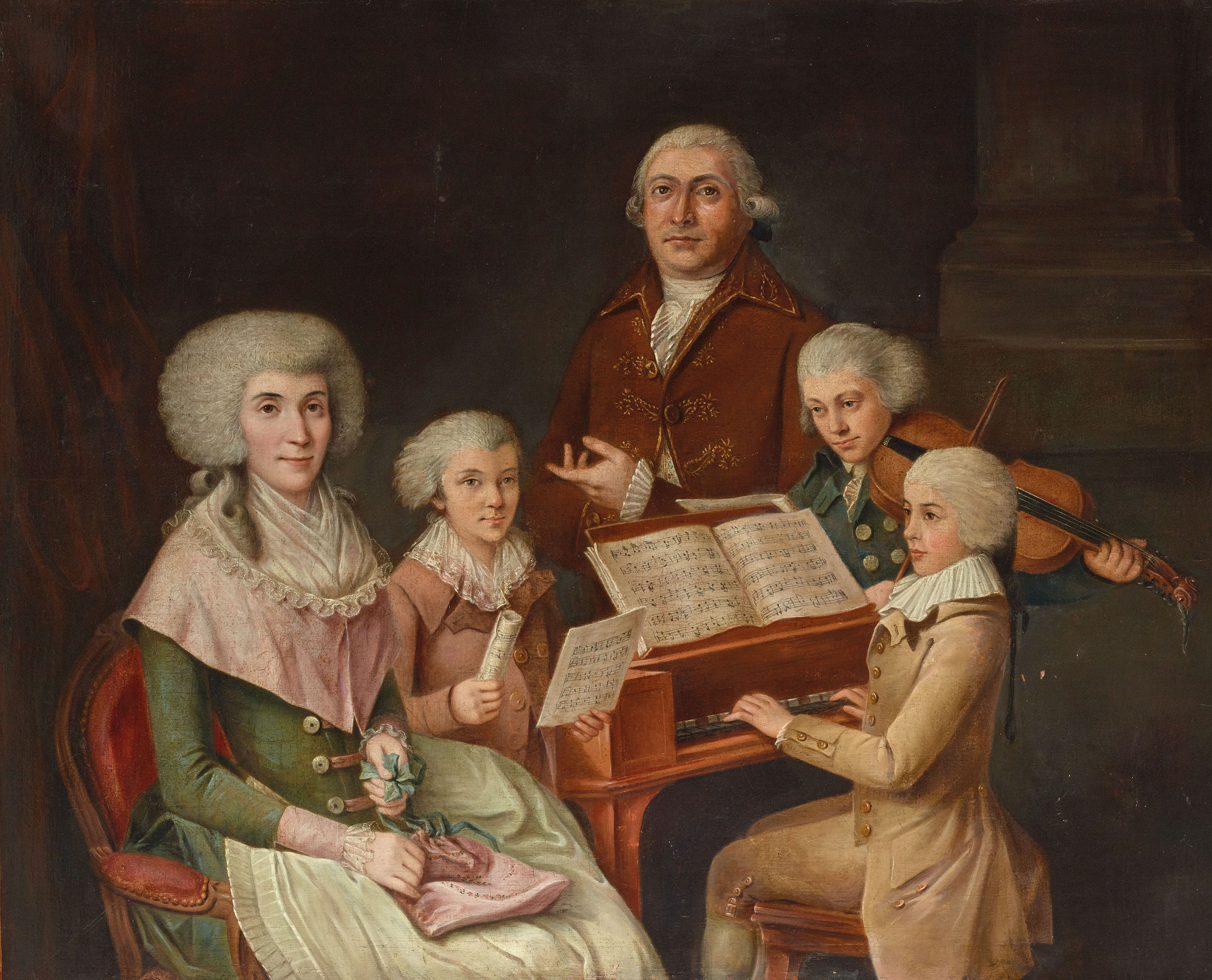
Mozart, at the keyboard, and Tom Linley, playing the violin, in Florence (c. 1770)

English translation	German	Original text
Before closing, I must tell you of a charming little occurrence. In Florence we found a young Englishman who is a pupil of the famous violinist Nardini. This boy, who plays beautifully and is of Wolfgang's size and age, came to the house of the learned poetess Sgra. Corilla, where we had come on the recommendation of Herr Laugier. These two boys performed in alternation during the whole evening, constantly embracing each other. The next day, the little Englishman, a very dear boy, had his violin brought to us and played the whole afternoon; Wolfgang accompanied him on the violin. The day after, we dined with Msr. Gavard, the Grand Duke's financial administrator, and these two boys played in alternation the whole afternoon, not as boys, but as men! Little Thomas accompanied us home and cried the most bitter tears because we were leaving the next day. But when he learned that our departure had been fixed for midday, he came at 9 o'clock in the morning and gave Wolfgang, amidst many embraces, the following piece of poetry, which Sgra. Corilla had had to write for him just the previous evening, and then accompanied our coach as far as the city gate. I wished that you had seen this scene.	Bevor ich schlüsse, muß ich dir eine artige Begebenheit schreiben. In Florenz fanden wir einen jungen Engelländer, welcher ein Schüler des Berühmten Violinisten Nardini ist. dieser knab, welcher wunderschön spielt, in des Wolfg: Grösse und alter ist, kam in das Hauß der gelehrten Poetin Sgra Corilla, wo wir uns aus recommendation des Mr: Laugier befanden. diese 2 knaben producierten sich wechselweise den ganzen abend unter beständigen umarmungen. den anderen tag Ließ der kleine Engelländer, ein allerliebster Knab, seine Violin zu uns bringen, und spielte den ganzen nachmittag, der Wolfg. accompagnierte ihm auf der Violin. den tag darauf speisten wir beÿ Mr: Gavard dem Administratore der Grossherzogl: Finanzen, und diese 2 knaben spielten den ganzen nachmittag wechselsweise, nicht als knaben, sondern als männer! der kleine Tomaso begleitete uns nach Hause, und weinte die bittersten Thrännen, weil wir den tag Darauf abreiseten. da er aber vernahm, daß unsere Abreise erst auf den Mittag vestgestellt seye, so kamm er morgens um 9 uhr, und gab dem Wolfg: unter vielen Umarmungen folgende Poesie, die die Sgra Corilla den Abend vorhero ihm noch machen muste, und dann begleitete er unsern wagen bis zum Stattthore. Ich wünschte, daß du diese Scene gesehen hättest.	Bevor ich schlüsse, muß ich dir eine artige Begebenheit schreibς. In Florenz fandς wir einς jungς Engelländς, welcher ein Schüler des Berühmtς Violinisten Nardini ist. dieser knab, welcher wunderschön spielt, in des Wolfgς: Grösse und alter ist, kam in das Hauß der gelehrtς Poetin Sgra Corilla, wo wir uns aus recomendation des Mr: Laugier befandς. diese 2 knabς produciertς sich wechselweise den ganzς abend unter beständigen umarmungς. den andςς tag Ließ der kleine Engelländς, ein allerliebster Knab, seine Violin zu uns bringς, und spielte den ganzς nachmittag, der Wolfgς. accompagnierte ihm auf dς Violin. den tag darauf speistς wir beÿ Mr: Gavard dem Administratore der Grossherzogl: Finanzen, und diese 2 knabς spieltς den ganzς nachmittag wechselsweise, nicht als knabς, sondς als mäner! der kleine Tomaso begleitete uns nach Hause, und weinte die bitterstς Thränς, weil wir den tag Darauf abreisetς. da er aber vernahm, daß unsere Abreise erst auf den Mittag vestge= stellt seye, so kam er morgens um 9 uhr, und gab dem Wolfgς: unter vielς Umarmungς folgende Poesie, die die Sgra Corilla den Abend vorhero ihm noch machς muste, und dan begleitete er unsern wagς bis zum Stattthore. Ich wünschte, daß du diese Scene gesehς hättest.

According to the Mozart-Linley-Kraus 250th Anniversary Festival press release, Linley kept a letter he received from Mozart for the rest of his life.

== Career as a musician and composer ==
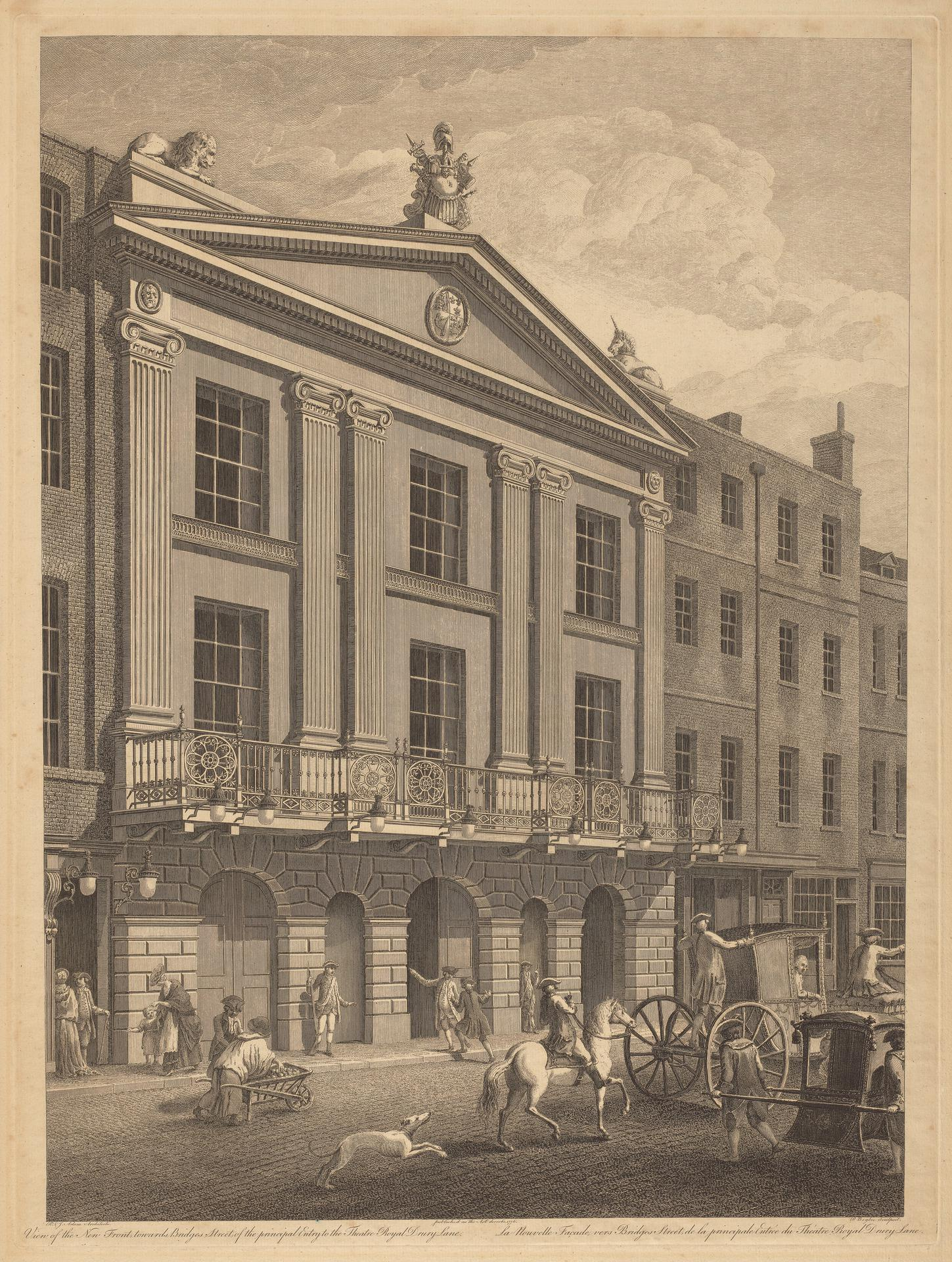
View of Theatre Royal, Drury Lane, ca.1776

Upon his return from Italy in 1771, Linley was recognised as one of the best violin virtuosos in Britain and became a leading figure in London's musical life. The Bath Chronicle and Weekly Gazette declared him "one of the moſt capital players on the violin in this kingdom" in a review of a concert on 10 September 1774 in Winchester. The composer Matthew Cooke, whose Short Account of the late Mr. Thomas Linley Junior, preserved inside the covers of a score of one of Linley's works, is one of the scarce first-hand sources of biographical information about Linley, states that "[his] industry and perseverance made him indefatigable. [and he] was one of the most eminent Violin Performers of the age."

In 1773, one of Linley's cantatas, In Yonder Grove, was performed at his benefit concert at the Haymarket by his sister Elizabeth and his brother Samuel. The same year he became a leader at Drury Lane theatre. There, he played concertos between the acts of operas and oratorios. 1773 also saw his first large scale work, the ode Let God Arise, composed for the Three Choir Festival in Worcester. The piece would be reprised at the same festival in Gloucester in 1775 with additional arias, some of which were probably composed for the castrato Venanzio Rauzzini. In Jackson's Oxford Journal of 26 August 1775 an advertisement for that prestigious event shows that Linley, who had only just turned 19, was reckoned to have his rightful place among the greatest names, his anthem sitting in the program between Handel's Coronation Anthem and Giardini's new oratorio:

GLOCESTER MUSIC MEETING. THE Meeting of the Three Choirs of Gloceſter, Worceſter and Hereford, for the Benefit of the Widows and Orphans of the poor Clergy of the three dioceſes, will be held at Gloceſter, on Wedneſday the 13th day of September, and the two following days. At the Cathedral, on Wedneſday morning, a Sermon will be preached by the Hon. and Right Reverend the Lord Biſhop of Landaff [sic.]: A TE DEUM and JUBILATE adapted to muſic of the moſt eminent Italian compoſers; an ANTHEM by Dr. Boyce; and Mr. Handel's CORONATION ANTHEM will be performed.- In the evening, at the Booth-hall, the Oratorio of ISRAEL IN EGYPT, and between the two parts of the Oratorio a MISCELLANEOUS ACT, conſiſting of SONGS, by Signior [sic.] Rauzzini and Miſs Linley, and Inſtrumental Pieces by Meſſrs Giardini, Fiſcher, and Croſdill. On the Thursday morning, at the Cathedral, Mr Handel's Dettingen TE DEUM and JUBILATE and CORONATION ANTHEM, and an ANTHEM compoſed by Mr. Linley, jun.- In the evening, at the Booth-hall, the Oratorio of RUTH, compoſed by Mr. Giardini, which has never been performed at theſe meetings; a SOLO on the VIOLIN by Mr. Giardini, and an OBOE CONCERTO by Mr. Fiſcher. On Friday morning, at the Cathedral, the MESSIAH.- In the evening, at the Booth-hall, a Grand MISCELLANEOUS CONCERT, conſiſting of capital Songs and Choruſes, and Inſtrumental Pieces. Principal Vocal Performers:- Miſs Linley; the much-admired Signior Rauzzini, principal Singer in the ſerious Opera; Miſs Salmon, Miſs Radcliffe, and the Female Chorus Singers from the North; Meſſ. Norris, Matthews, and Price. Inſtrumental:- Meſſrs Giardini, Fiſcher, Croſdill, Malchair, Parke; the other parts of the Inſtrumental Band by the moſt approved Performers now in England. The Choruſſes are intended to be particularly full. The whole to be conducted by Mr. ISAAC. The Performers are desired to be in Gloceſter on Sunday evening, in order to rehearſe on Monday morning, the IIth, and to dine the ſame day with the Stewards, at the King's-head. The Hon. JOHN TRACY, D. D.- Sir WILLIAM GUISE, Bart. – Stewards

Linley carried on performing under his father both in Bath and in London at Drury Lane, where Linley the Elder had become a musical director. On Thursday 16 March 1775 the Bath Chronicle and Weekly Gazette published the following advertisement:

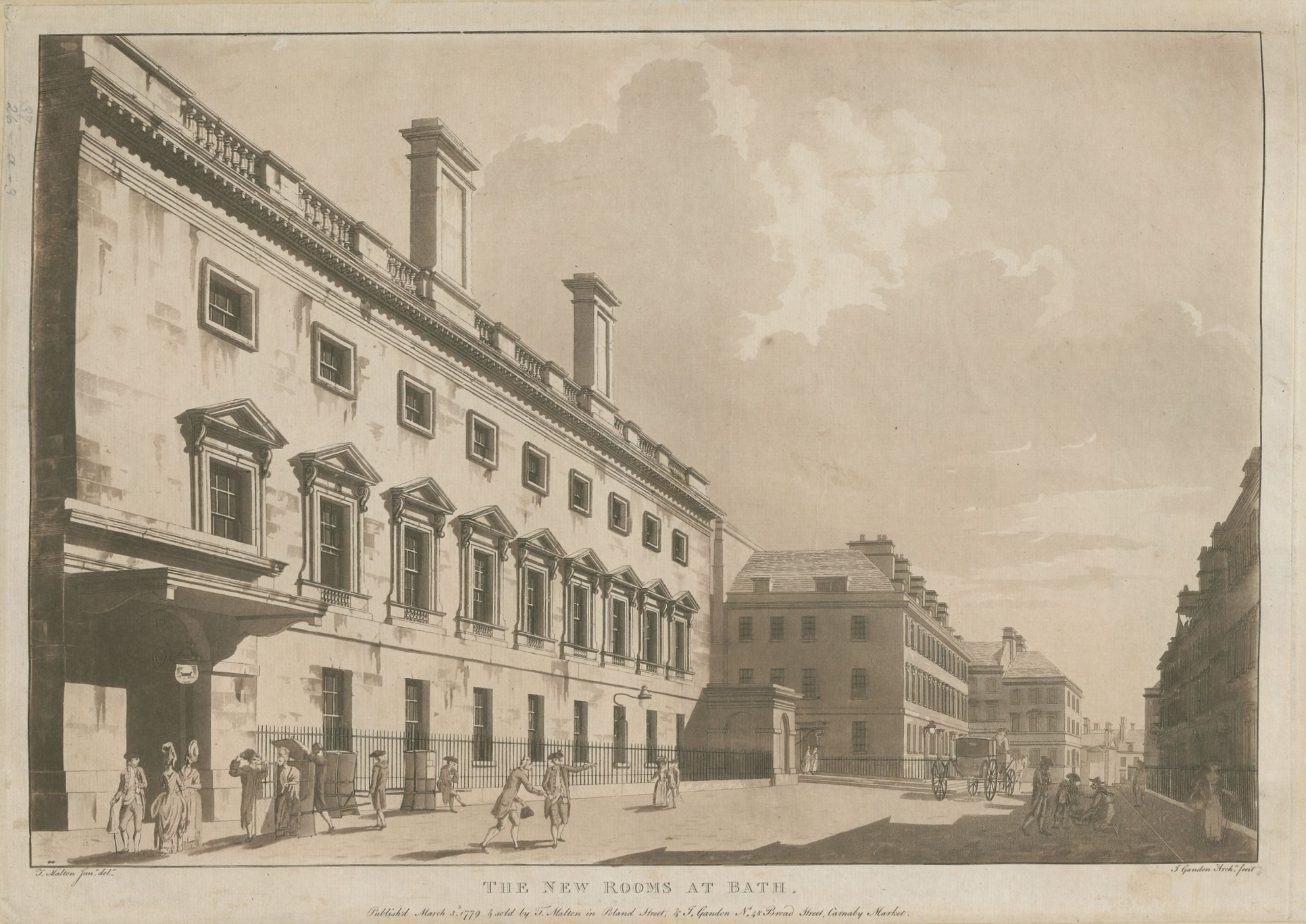
The New Rooms at Bath. Publish'd March 3d 1779 & sold by T. Malton in Poland Street, & J. Gandon No. 48 Broad Street, Carnaby Market. (James Gandon, 1779, The BL King's Topographical Collection, British Library shelfmark: Maps K.Top.37.26.a.3.)

BATH. AT the NEW ROOMS, on Friday March 17, will be performed the celebrated ODE of ALEXANDER's FEAST Set to muſic by Mr. HANDEL. The firſt violin by Mr. Linley, jun. The principal vocal parts by Miſs Linley, Miſs M. Linley, Mr. Linley, Mr. Brett, Mr. Matthews, and Maſter Samuel. Between the Iſt and 2d parts, a Miſcellaneous Act.- Organ Concerto.- Song, Miſs Linley.- Concerto Violin, Linley, jun.- Duetto Sacchini. To Subſcribers five tickets for one guinea. Single tickets at 5s. each, to be had at the Upper and Lower Rooms, the Pump-Room, and Rookfellers, where Books of the performance may be had at 6d. each. To begin at half paſt ſix o'clock.

At Mr. Gyde's Rooms on Friday March 24, the celebrated Entertainment of ACIS and GALATEA.- With additional pieces, as will be expreſſed in the bills.

But Linley also occasionally "led the band", as stated by the Bath Chronicle and Weekly Gazette of 29 February 1776 in a glowing review of the representation of Handel's Acis and Galatea.

The Duenna or the Double Elopement was a collaboration between Sheridan, who wrote the play, and Linley who produced the majority of the music, composing some parts (such as the overture) and, in a pasticcio manner, also adapting and arranging famous airs from contemporary operas and other tunes selected by Sheridan and Elizabeth Ann. Music from his father is also present in the work. It opened in Covent Garden in November 1775 to great success, with 75 performances in its first season and a total of 254 in the 18th century. Samuel Johnson declared it one of "the best two comedies of [his] age". Its popularity was such that King George III brought his family to see it several times and Garrick allegedly lost most of his audience at the nearby Drury Lane Theatre. It was so successful that it remained on stage all over Britain for more than 60 years, until the middle of the 19th century.

From then on the scale of Linley's works expanded dramatically. In 1776, he wrote his Shakespeare Ode, also known as Ode on the Witches, Fairies and Aerial Beings of Shakespeare. The piece attracted the most enthusiastic review in The Morning Post of 21 March 1776 which declared that "The composition must be allowed to be an extraordinary effort of genius in so young a man [...] the fugue of the overture is masterly [...] the song "There in old Arden's inmost shade" [...] would not disgrace a Sacchini or Bach [...] the oboe song in the second part [...] shews this young composer has the brilliancy and warmth of invention so peculiar attendant on the spring of life [...] His merit, even at this early time of life, is certainly sufficient to challenge the warmest encouragement from the public, even though our Amateurs should not yet be brought to overlook the misfortune of his being – an Englishman".

According to Matthew Cooke, by this time ("between the years 1771 and 1776"), Linley had "composed no less than Twenty Concertos for the violin [...and] many of these [...had been] performed by him [...] at Drury Lane [...] and [...had been] received with the most unbounded applause."

In 1777 he composed what is generally viewed as his masterpiece: an oratorio about the crossing of the Red Sea, The Song of Moses, which was reprised in 1778 in a slightly modified version.

Sheridan's production of Shakespeare's The Tempest at the Drury Lane theatre in 1777 gave Linley the opportunity to compose new incidental music, including, in lieu of the first scene, a Storm Chorus (Arise, ye Spirits of the Storm) that the musicologist Roger Fiske deemed "one of the most remarkable achievements in English music". According to the Mozart-Linley-Kraus 250th Anniversary Festival press release, "[it] was performed in London representations of that play for about forty years after Linley's death, before it was [...] supplanted by Henry Bishop's [...] Tempest." In addition to that chorus, Linley composed an air for Ariel's first appearance in the play, re-arranged some of the play's established music, including some of the numbers written by Thomas Arne, and wrote a separate setting of Hark, Hark, the Watch-dogs Bark in which the instruments of the orchestra are meant to somewhat render the sound of dogs barking and of cockerels.

Unlike the prior resounding success of The Duenna, his last stage work, The Cady of Bagdad (1778), was a relative failure.

== Musical style ==
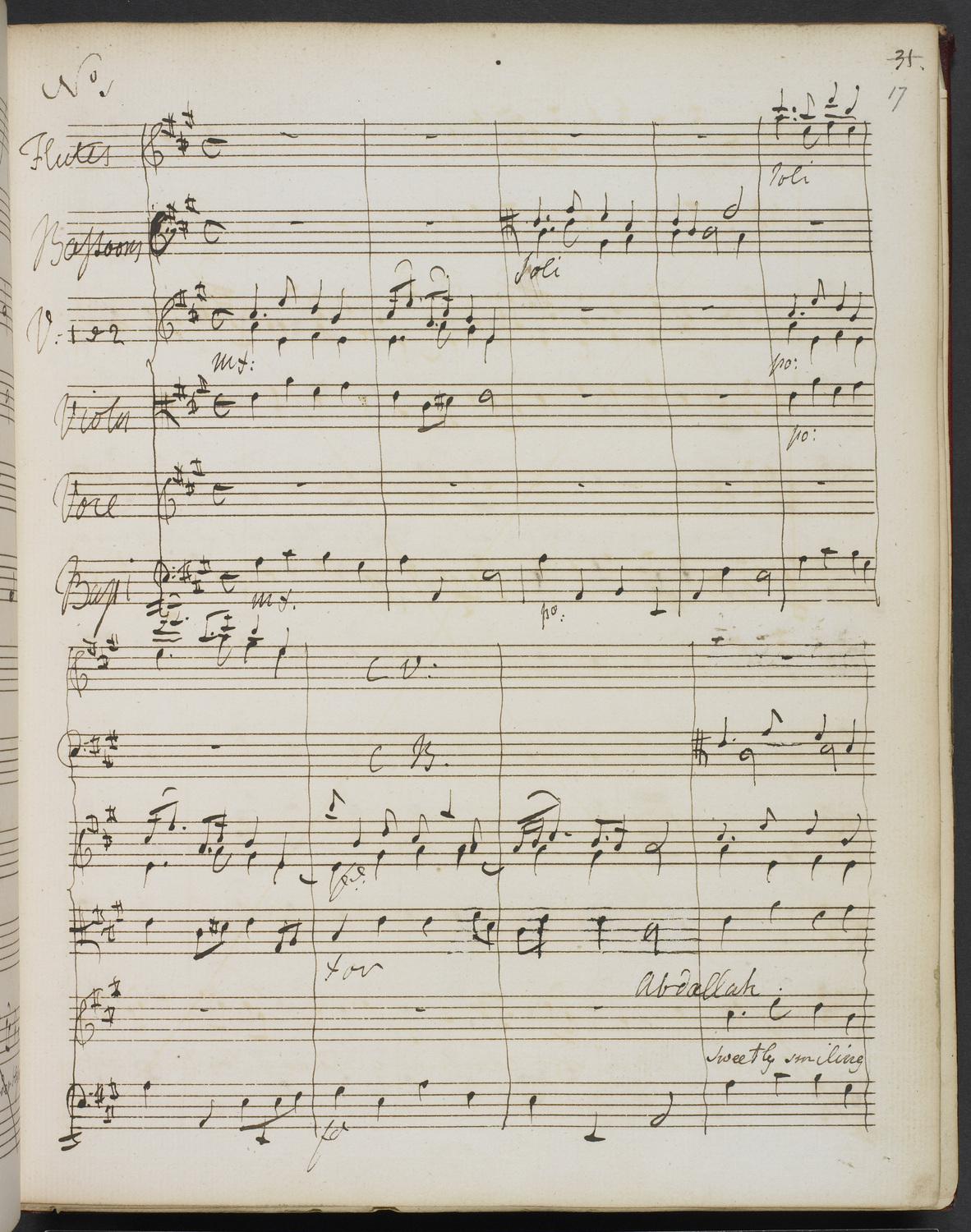
A page from the manuscript of Thomas Linley's The Cady of Bagdad, possibly in the composer's hand.

A significant number of Linley's compositions have been lost, including many in the Drury Lane Fire of 1809. However, according to Gwilym Beechey (author of the article on Linley in the New Grove Dictionary and editor of some of his music), the works that survived attest to "his fluent and congenial melody, his contrapuntal facility, and his imaginative orchestration."

Linley's music is both typical of works by English composers of his time and remarkably idiosyncratic for a composer who died at such a young age. As with other English composers of the second half of the 18th century, the influence of Handel is evident in his choral works (for instance in Let God Arise), however his choral writing has its own inventiveness and artistry. Linley's writing is as fluent in choral-like choruses as in elaborate fugues or evocative tableaux. He was only about 15 years old when he composed the skilful double-fugue Wonderful Art Thou. Musician Peter Holman, who worked on the Hyperion recordings of Linley's music, writes that, in The Song of Moses, "[Linley's music] has a grandeur and sweep that makes its subsequent neglect hard to understand."

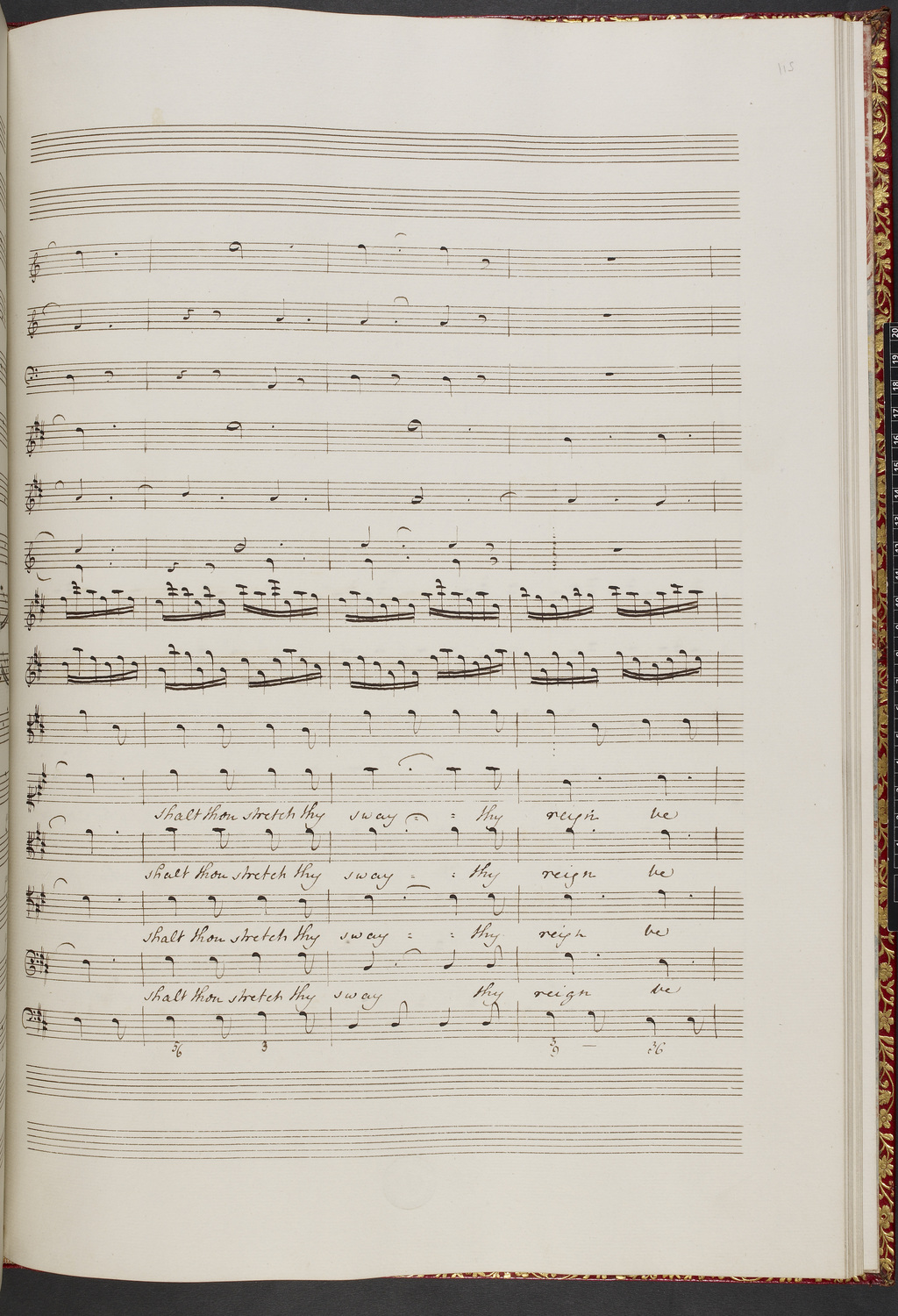
A page from Thomas Linley's The Song of Moses, in the hand of J. S. Gaudry.

His vocal writing and the orchestration of his vocal music, though rooted in the influence of Johann Christian Bach's galant style and Arne's later music as well as the Italian operatic music still very much en vogue at the time, has been described as creative and fresh. His orchestral cantatas, in the style of those composed by Arne and others for the pleasure gardens of Vauxhall, feature refined obligato instrumental parts that either intertwine with the singers' voice (such as the oboe in the airs 'Fly, Damon, to yon secret grove' and 'If thy too-cruel bow be bent') or colour the piece with poetic evocations (the french horn in the air 'Wrapt close from harm' in the cantata Ye Nymphs of Albion's Beauty-blooming Isle).

The vocal and orchestral writing in his stage works also display qualities found in music composed by more mature composers; his ability to intensify the protagonists' characterisations is remarkable. The music to The Duenna, though written in haste, was reckoned to have not only saved that comic opera from shallowness, but been the main reason for its success. However, Johnson, Byron and Hazlitt regarded Sheridan's text as among the finest comedies, and Prokofiev and Roberto Gerhard also set it to music.

Linley's only surviving violin concerto was probably composed after his return from Italy as it has little in common with concertos he would have known before. The en-vogue Italianate galant style – inspired by the likes of Nardini, Lolli, Giardini and others – pervades the composition, however Linley's inventiveness is evident in his way of mixing passages of extreme technical demand on the soloist (virtuosic and complex musical lines set above the 5th position, long continuous passages of double-stops, octave scales, rapid extreme register jumps, etc.) with stark, sober – almost plain – moments (the 'Scotch' of the second movement, the introduction of the theme by the soloist in the first movement, or the ending of the third movement in a quiet ritornello that does not bring the usual strong resolution expected at the end of a concerto but leaves us in suspense). His fresh approach to colourful orchestration both in terms of instrumentation and harmony (in particular the harmonic progressions in cadences and suspensions) also makes his concerto quite distinctive.

His only surviving violin sonata also attests to Linley's mastery of the instrument, with extreme technical difficulties including playing most of the time at the extreme upper register of the instrument (three octaves above middle C, or even higher), long passages of double-stops, rapid arpeggios across the full register of the instrument, quick jumps of more than two octaves and fast scales in alternate octaves, making it a bravura piece in the spirit of a capriccio, despite its sonata form.

The orchestration in his last major work, the incidental music to The Cady of Bagdad, "shows Linley becoming more experimental, particularly in his writing for brass and winds" according to conductor Peter Leech. He adds that "it is tempting to speculate about the directions [Linley's] musical imagination would have taken", had he lived longer.

== The Music to The Duenna or The Double Elopement ==
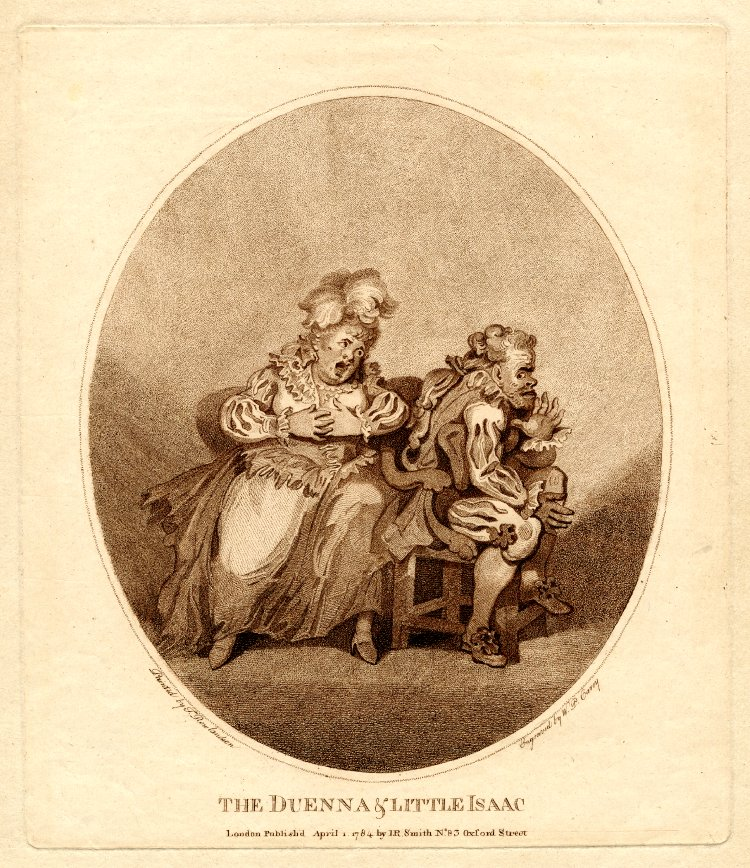
Scene from The Duenna with John Quick as Isaac and Jane Green as the Duenna. (William Paulet Carey print from Thomas Rowlandson, 1784, The British Museum)

The birth of the comic opera The Duenna in 1775 was not an easy one, despite both Sheridan's and the Covent Garden director's enthusiasm; almost 50 years had passed since the success of The Beggar's Opera, and comic operas had lost their popularity. But Sheridan's play The Rivals, created in January 1775, had been such a great success that they thought a new comedy by the same author, to which would be added musical interludes, could not fail.

It seems that Sheridan had originally planned for his father-in-law, Thomas Linley Sr, to write the music. However the composer did not seem to share his enthusiasm. Firstly, he doubted the possible success of a comic opera. Secondly, to Linley Sr's frustration, Sheridan was only giving him isolated songs to set to music, judiciously keeping him in the dark about the play's subject by withholding the whole libretto from the composer, undoubtedly because of the resemblance it bore to Sheridan's own elopement with the composer's daughter Elizabeth. Finally, Linley Sr was hoping to "take over [...] the Lenten Oratorio seasons at the Drury Lane Theatre" and therefore may have been reluctant to take on a project at the Drury Lane's direct rival, Covent Garden.

With the date of the premiere approaching and not much work completed, Linley Sr resolved to ask his son for help with composing the music. Linley Jr became the chief contributor to The Duenna's music, composing about a third of the total. On top of which he arranged and edited the folk songs selected by Sheridan and Elizabeth and the additional arias by other composers, his father's input representing a bit more than a quarter of the whole opera. Despite the haste in which they were composed, Linley Jr's songs were not just beautiful but played a paramount role in the success of The Duenna by deepening the characterisation of the protagonists of the play.

Overture to The Duenna or The Double Elopement by Thomas Linley Jr (First page of the vocal score published by C.&S. Thompson, 1776)

Linley Sr eventually agreed to go to London to assist with the rehearsals, but he "insisted for the Linley name not to be associated with the opera". Composer Andrew Edwards suggests that, though pasticcios of the kind were common practice, Linley Sr may have "disapprov[ed] of the way the music had been [...] put together", however the subject of the play – as mentioned above – might also have played its part.

If the original text of Sheridan's libretto rapidly slipped into unreliable, corrupted and "debased" versions due to its complex copyright and publication history, according to William Davies (editor of Linley's music for some of the Hyperion recordings and author of the first critical edition of his 1778 opera The Cady of Bagdad), the state of The Duenna's music is even "more fragmentary". Of the overture originally published in 8 parts a bassoon part is missing in the first and third movements. Thanks to the memorial edition of his works in 1780, Linley's full score of his own numbers has survived. In addition to that, an autograph copy of Act III also exists, though it is missing the finale. However only one of the borrowed arias survived in full score. The rest of the music only survived in the frustrating format of vocal scores (Queen Charlotte's 1775 manuscript copy and the 1776 published one) which do not provide much aside from the vocal line and a crude skeleton accompaniment (mainly the bass line) with little to no mention of instrumental or orchestration details. The vocal score published by Broderip & Wilkinson in 1800 seems to be a simple re-edition of the 1776 one by C.&S. Thompson, without any amendment or addition. Finally, the vocal score published 1835, though it reinstated some of the musical numbers lost at the turn of the century, further diluted the original music by adapting it to the new singing conventions and musical taste.

The list of music and composers below was established by Andrew Edwards based on "the volumes of Tom's music which Thomas Senior and George III commissioned after his death and on [...] the manuscript sources by Roger Friske [sic.] and [...] William Davies."

Colour key

- Thomas Linley Jr (composed by)
- Thomas Linley Jr (arranged by)
- Thomas Linley Sr (composed by)
- Thomas Linley Sr (arranged by)
- Other composers (arranger uncertain)
- Folk tunes (arranger uncertain)
- Uncertain attribution

Act	Title	Composer	Character(s)
	Overture	Thomas Linley Jr	
Act I	Serenade "Tell me my lute"	Thomas Linley Jr	Antonio
Act I	"The Crimson Morn"	Thomas Linley Sr	Antonio
Act I	Trio: "What vagabonds"/"Adieu Antonio"	Thomas Linley Sr	Don Jerome, Antonio, Louisa
Act I	"Could I each fault remember"	Thomas Linley Jr	Ferdinand
Act I	"I could never lustre see"	Thomas Linley Sr	Antonio
Act I	"Friendship is the bound of reason"	Thomas Linley Jr	Antonio
Act I	"Tho' cause for suspicion appear"	William Jackson	Ferdinand
Act I	"Thou can'st not boast"	Thomas Linley Sr	Louisa
Act I	"If a daughter you have"	Scottish air	Don Jerome
Act I	"When sable night"	Scottish or English air	Clara
Act I	"Had I a heart"	Irish air ("The harp that once")	Don Jerome
Act I	"My mistress expects me"	Thomas Linley Jr	Isaac, Louisa
Act I	"Gentle maid"	Thomas Linley Jr	Don Carlos
Act I	Trio: "May'st thou never happy be"	Thomas Linley Jr	Louisa, Don Carlos, Isaac
Act II	"Give Isaac the nymph"	Thomas Linley Sr	Isaac
Act II	"When the maid"	Thomas Linley Sr	Don Jerome
Act II	"When a tender maid"	Galliard	Duenna
Act II	"Ah, sure a pair was never seen"	Michael Arne	Don Carlos
Act II	Duet "Believe me good sir"	John Travers	Isaac, Don Jerome
Act II	"A bumper of good liquor"	Thomas Linley Sr	Ferdinand, Isaac, Don Jerome
Act II	"What bard O Time discover"	Tommaso Giordani	Louisa
Act II	"O had my love ne'er smiled on me"	Scottish air	Don Carlos
Act II	Trio: "Soft pity never leaves"	William Hayes	Louisa, Don Carlos, Antonio
Act III	"O the days when I was young"	Thomas Linley Sr	Don Jerome
Act III	"Ah cruel maid"	William Jackson	Ferdinand
Act III	"Shall not my soul" & "Sharp is th woe"	Thomas Linley Jr	Ferdinand
Act III	"By him we love offended"	Venanzio Rauzzini	Clara
Act III	"How oft, Louisa, hast thou said"	Scottish air	Antonio
Act III	"Adieu thou dreary pile"	Antonio Sacchini	Clara
Act III	Friars' Glee: "This bottle's the sun of our table"	Thomas Linley Sr	Friar Paul, Masquerader
Act III	Duet:"Turn thee round, I pray thee"	Thomas Linley Jr	Louisa, Clara
Act III	"Oft does Hymen smile to hear"	Francesco Geminiani	Ferdinand, Antonio, Louisa, Clara
Act III	Finale	Thomas Morley ("Now is the month of Maying")	Don Jerome, Louisa, Ferdinand, Clara, Antonio

Modern representations:

- Oct.-Nov. 2010: ETO Baroque Orchestra. Richard Stuart (Don Jerome), Charlotte Page (Louisa), Damian Thantrey (Ferdinand), Nuala Willis (Margaret, the Duenna), Olivia Safe (Clara), Joseph Shovelton (Antonio), Adrian Thompson (Isaac), Jonathan Gunthorpe (Carlos), Adam Tunnicliffe (Masquerader). Conductor: Joseph McHardy. Stage director: Michael Barker-Caven. Designer: Adam Wiltshire. Lighting Designer: Guy Hoare. Assistant Director: Oliver Baird. Movement Director: Yael Loewenstein.

== Works ==
=== Stage works ===
The Duenna (comic opera, libretto by R. B. Sheridan). 1775. (Overture, songs, ensembles, etc.)
The Tempest (libretto by Sheridan, after Shakespeare). 1777. (Ariel's first air "O Bid Your Faithful Ariel Fly", "Come Unto These Yellow Sands" and "Hark, hark, the watch-dogs bark" and the Storm chorus)
The Cady of Bagdad (afterpiece comic opera, libretto by Abraham Portal). 1778.
The Triumph of Mirth, or Harlequin's Wedding (pantomime, libretto by Thomas King). Created posthumously to Linley's death, in 1782. (Overture)

=== Other vocal works ===
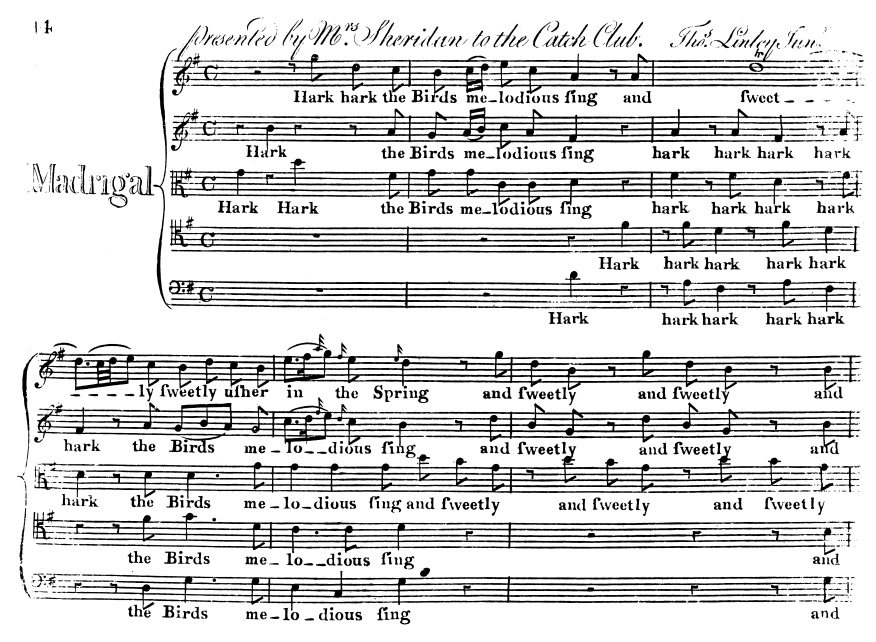
First page of "Hark, Hark the Birds", a madrigal by Thomas Linley presented by Sheridan to the Catch Club

Let God arise (anthem, Psalm 68) for 2 sopranos, tenor, bass, chorus and orchestra. 1773.
A Lyric Ode (libretto by French Laurence) for 2 sopranos, tenor, bass, chorus and orchestra. 1776. (Also known as: A Lyric Ode on the Fairies, Aerial Beings, and Witches of Shakespeare or The Shakespeare Ode)
The Song of Moses (oratorio, libretto by John Hoadly, after Exodus). 1777.
Verses to the Memory of Garrick (libretto by R. B. Sheridan), recited with musical sections for solo voices and chorus.
ca. 13 cantatas, madrigals, glees, elegies and songs etc, published in The Posthumous Vocal Works of Mr. Linley and Mr. T. Linley (London, ca.1798) and other separate songs, madrigals etc.

Including:

- When gay Philander (3 voices with bass)
- Why steals from my bosom (3 voices with bass)
- To heal the wound (3 voices with bass)
- No other love (3 voices with bass)
- Madrigal presented by Mr. Sheridan to the Catch Club "Hark! Hark! The birds". Madrigal in G major (5 voices, unaccompanied)
- 'Alinda's form as I survey'. Madrigal (4 voices unaccompanied)
- In Yonder Grove. Cantata (voice, oboe, and orchestra)
- Ye Nymphs of Albion's beauty-blooming isle. Cantata (voice, french horn, orchestra)
- Daughter of Heav'n fair art though. Cantata (voice and orchestra)
- Primroses deck the bank's green side. Song.

=== Instrumental works ===
6 violin sonatas, 1768. (lost?)
La settima sonata, 1769. (Only the sonata in A survived)
ca. 20 violin concertos composed by 1775. Only the violin concerto in F survives complete. (The third movement of his father's overture to The Gentle Shepherd (1781) is allegedly an adaptation from another of Linley's concertos.)

== Death ==
Linley was a guest of the Duke of Ancaster with his sister Mary and "his Companion Mr. Olivarez, Italian Master" – maybe the Spanish violin virtuoso and composer Juan Oliver y Astorga – at Grimsthorpe Castle in Lincolnshire, where he drowned in a boating accident "just three months after his 22nd birthday".

The press reported the circumstances of his death as follows:

Drewry's Derby Mercury, Friday 14 August 1778:

On the 5th Inſtant a melancholy Accident happened at Grimſthorpe in Lincolnſhire, the Seat of his Grace the Duke Ancaſter:- Mr. Thomas Linley, eldeſt Son of Mr. Linley, one of the Proprietors of Drury-lane Theatre, Mr. Olivarez, an Italian Maſter, and another Perſon, agreed to go on the Lake in his Grace's Park, in a Sailing Boat, which Mr. Linley ſaid he could manage very well; but no ſooner had they ſailed into the Middle, than a ſudden Squall of Wind ſprung up, and overſet the Boat; however, they all hung by the Maſt and Rigging for ſome Time, till Mr. Linley ſaid, he found it was in vain to wait for Aſſiſtance, and therefore, though he had his Boots and Great Coat on, he was determined to ſwim to Shore, for that purpoſe he quitted his Hold, but had not ſwam above 100 Yards before he ſank to the Bottom, and was unfortunately drowned. Her Grace of Ancaſter ſaw the Whole from her Dreſſing-Room Window, and immediately diſpatched ſeveral Servants off to take another Boat to their Aſſiſtance, which unfortunately came only Time enough to save Mr. Olivarez.- Mr Linley remained under Water near 40 Minutes, ſo that every Effort made uſe of to resſtore him to Life proved ineffectual. – This Accident has deprived the Profeſſion to which he belonged of one of its Principal Ornaments, and Society of a very accompliſhed and valuable Member.

Jackson's Oxford Journal, Saturday 15 August 1778:

On Wedneſday the 5th Inſtant, Mr. Thomas Linley, eldeſt Son of Mr. Linley, one of the Proprietors of Drury-lane Theatre, fell out of a Boat into a Lake belonging to his Grace the Duke Ancaſter, at Grimſthorpe in Lincolnſhire, and was unfortunately drowned. The Circumſtances of his Death are thus related by a Perſon just arrived from Grimſthorpe: Mr. Linley and Mr. Olivarez, Italian Maſter, and another Perſon, agreed to go on the Lake in a Sailing Boat, which Mr. Linley ſaid he could manage; but no ſooner had they ſailed into the Middle of the Lake, than a ſudden Gale of Wind ſprang up, and overſet the Boat; however, they all hung by the Maſt and Rigging for ſome Time, till Mr. Linley ſaid he found it was in vain to wait for Aſsiſtance, and therefore, though he had his Boots and Great Coat on, was determined to ſwim to Shore, for which Purpoſe he quitted his Hold, but had not ſwam above a hundred Yards before he ſunk. Her Grace the Ducheſs of Ancaſter ſaw the whole from her Dreſsing-room Window, and immediately ordered ſeveral Servants to take another Boat, and go to their Aſsiſtance, but they unfortunately only came early enough to take up Mr. Olivarez, his Companion, not being able to find the Body of Mr. Linley for more than forty Minutes.— Miſs M. Linley came up to Town with the melancholy Tidings of the Diſaster, and now lies dangerously ill at the Duke of Ancaſter's in Berkeley-ſquare; Mrs Sheridan is likewiſe inconfortable [sic.] for the Loſs of ſo valuable a Brother; and Yeſterday Mr. Linley his father whoſe Sufferings on the Occaſion no Language can expreſs, went down to pay the laſt Tribute to a beloved Son.

Ipswich Journal, Saturday 15 August 1778

On Wednesday laſt a moſt melancholy accident happened at Grimſthorpe, the Duke of Ancaſter's ſeat in Lincolnſhire. As Mr. Linley, jun. (who with his ſiſter was ſpending the ſummer there with the Duke and Ducheſs) was in a veſſel uppon a large piece of water in the park, by some unſkilful management, the wind being high, the veſſel ſunk, and Mr. Linley, in endeavouring to ſwim on ſhore, was unfortunately drowned. His body was taken up in about 40 minutes, and every poſſible method (according to Mr. Hawes's plan) uſed for his recovery; but unfortunately without ſucceſs.

His funeral was held at Edenham parish church but parish records seem to indicate that he was not buried there. Local rumour has it that his body may have been taken to Bath to be interred.

Linley's death was a shock to his contemporaries and was immediately recognised as both a human tragedy and a tragedy for the arts and for English music in particular. A memorial edition of his works was commissioned by King George III.

In his memoirs the Irish tenor Michael Kelly remembers how, in about 1786 after a concert in Vienna, he happened to be sitting at supper between Mozart and Constance Weber, and Mozart, to whom he was being introduced for the first time, "conversed with [him] a good deal about Thomas Linley ... with whom he was intimate at Florence, and [how Mozart] spoke of him with great affection... [saying] that Linley was a true genius; and [that] he felt that, had he lived, he would have been one of the greatest ornaments of the musical world."

== Discography ==
Despite its remarkable quality and idiosyncrasies, the music of Thomas Linley Jr is not widely known. There are however a few commercial recordings in existence, most of them published by the independent British classical label Hyperion and its subsidiary label Helios.

- A Lyric Ode on the Fairies, Aerial Beings and Witches of Shakespeare, The Parley of Instruments, Paul Nicholson (Helios, CDA66613, 2005)
- Cantatas & Theatre Music (Music for The Tempest, Overture to The Duenna and the three cantatas: In Yonder Grove, Ye Nymphs of Albion's beauty-blooming isle and Daughter of Heav'n fair art though) Julia Gooding, The Parley of Instruments, Paul Nicholson (Helios, CDA66767, 2006)
- The Song of Moses & Let God arise, The Parley of Instruments, Peter Holman (Helios, CDA67038, 2008)
- The song "To heal the wound a bee had made" is available on Enchanting Harmonist – A soirée with the Linleys of Bath, Rufus Müller, Invocation (Hyperion, CDA66698, 1993)
- A Violin Sonata in A major is available on English 18th-century Violin Sonatas, The Locatelli Trio (Hyperion, CDA66583, 1992)
- His only surviving violin concerto (Violin Concerto in F major) is available on English Classical Violin Concertos, Elizabeth Wallfisch, The Parley of Instruments, Peter Holman (Helios, CDH55260, 2008)

Another recording of Linley's Violin Concerto in F major is available on the label Oehms Classics:

- Mozart in Italien, Mirjam Contzen, Bayerische Kammerphilharmonie, Reinhard Goebel (Oehms Classics, OC 753, 2010)

Another recording of the Lyric Ode is available on the label Philips Classics:

- A Shakespeare Ode on the Witches and Fairies, Musicians of the Globe, Philip Pickett (Philips Classics, 446–689–2, 1998)

Two arias from The Tempest ("Come Unto these Yellow Sands" and "Faithful Ariel") – wrongly attributed by the publisher to Thomas Linley the elder – are available on the label Navona Records:

- The Shakespeare Concerts Series, Vol. 5: Full Fathom Five, Andrea Chenoweth, Stephen Hammer, Arcadia Players, Ian Watson (Navona Records, NV5996, 2015)

The aria "O bid your faithful Ariel fly" from The Tempest is also available on the label Eloquence:

- Eighteenth-Century Shakespearean Songs, April Cantelo, English Chamber Orchestra, Raymond Leppard (Eloquence, ELQ4824765, Decca 4824765, 1961)

== See also ==
Linley family tree

Thomas Linley	Mary Johnson
Richard Brinsley Sheridan, 1751-1816	Elizabeth, 1754-92	Thomas, 1756-78	Mary, 1758-87	Richard Tickell
Thomas Sheridan, 1775-1817	Samuel, 1760 - 1778	Maria, 1763-84	Ozias, 1765-1831	William, (1771-1835)	5 other children
