= 1789 in Great Britain =

Events from the year 1789 in Great Britain.

== Incumbents ==
- Monarch – George III
- Prime Minister – William Pitt the Younger (Tory)

== Events ==
- 3 February – Prime Minister William Pitt the Younger introduces a Regency Bill to Parliament so that the Prince of Wales may serve as regent for his father George III during a period of mental illness, but the King recovers before the Bill becomes law.
- March – first version of a graphic description of a slave ship (the Brookes) issued on behalf of the English Society for Effecting the Abolition of the Slave Trade.
- 18 March – Catherine Murphy, a counterfeiter, becomes the last woman in Britain to suffer a sentence of death by burning, at Newgate Prison in London (although she is in practice strangled before being burnt).
- April – Privy Council report on the slave trade published.
- 20 April – first boat passes through the Thames and Severn Canal's Sapperton Tunnel near Cirencester in Gloucestershire. At 3,817 yards (3,490 m) it is the longest tunnel of any kind in England at this date.
- 28 April – Fletcher Christian leads a mutiny on HMS Bounty against Captain William Bligh in Polynesia.
- 12 May – William Wilberforce makes his first major speech in the House of Commons on the abolition of the slave trade.
- 14 June – Mutiny on the Bounty survivors including Captain William Bligh and 18 others reach Timor after a nearly 4,000-mile journey in an open boat.
- 28 August – William Herschel discovers Enceladus, one of Saturn's moons.
- 17 September – William Herschel discovers Mimas, another of Saturn's moons.
- 4 November – Richard Price preaches a sermon in London, A Discourse on the Love of Our Country, igniting the Revolution Controversy.
- 19 November – Thames and Severn Canal opened throughout, giving through navigation between the Thames and Severn.

=== Undated ===
- Charles Dibdin introduces the nautical song Tom Bowling in his London entertainment The Oddities.
- The song The Lass of Richmond Hill, with music by James Hook to words by Leonard McNally, is first performed publicly by Charles Incledon at Vauxhall Gardens in London.
- Rev. Dr. Edmund Cartwright patents his first practical power loom and designs a wool combing machine.
- Industrial conglomerate Newton, Chambers & Co. established in Sheffield.
- Andrew Pears introduces Pears soap in London.

== Publications ==
- William Blake's book of poetry Songs of Innocence and of Experience and his first published prophetic book The Book of Thel.
- Erasmus Darwin's poem The Loves of the Plants, a popular rendering of Linnaeus' works.
- Former slave Olaudah Equiano's autobiography The Interesting Narrative of the Life of Olaudah Equiano, one of the earliest published works by a black writer.

== Births ==
- 5 January – Thomas Pringle, poet (died 1834)
- 14 July – Timothy Yeats Brown, consul to Genoa (died 1858)
- 19 July – John Martin, painter (died 1854)
- 28 September – Richard Bright, physician, "Father of Nephrology" (died 1858)
- 25 December – Elizabeth Jesser Reid, social reformer (died 1866)
- James Morrison, millionaire retail draper and politician (died 1857)

== Deaths ==
- 1 January – Fletcher Norton, 1st Baron Grantley, politician (born 1716)
- 8 January – Jack Broughton, English boxer (born 1703)
- 23 January – Frances Brooke, writer (born 1724)
- 23 January – John Cleland, novelist (born 1709)
- 26 February – Eclipse, racehorse (born 1764)
- 20 July – David Nelson, botanist on HMS Bounty (birth date unknown)
- 26 November – John Elwes, miser and politician (born 1714)

== See also ==
- 1789 in Wales
