= Clatter =

Clatter may refer to:

- Clatter, Powys, a village in Wales
- Clatter, or clitter, the blockfield strewn below the tors of Dartmoor
- Clatter, a brook in Clatterbridge, Wirral, England

== See also ==
- Klatter, a 2004 noise rock album
- Clutter (disambiguation)
- Clater, a surname
