= Charles Incledon =

English singer

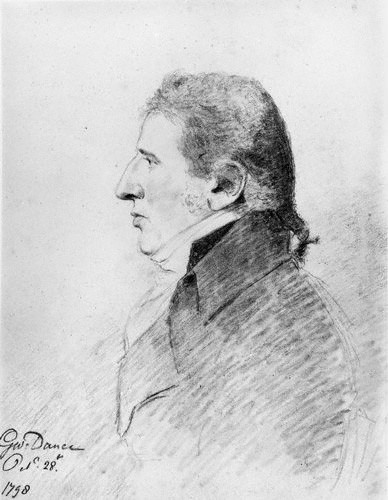

Charles Benjamin Incledon (pronounced 'Ingledon') (1763 – 11 February 1826, Worcester) was a Cornish tenor singer, who became one of the foremost English singers of his time, especially in the singing of English theatre music and ballads in which he was considered without rival.

== Early career ==
Charles Benjamin Incledon, the son of a doctor in St Keverne, Cornwall, was educated at Blundell's School and as a choirboy and soloist at Exeter Cathedral, under the tuition of organist and composer William Jackson. Before his voice broke, he was accustomed to sing in the Cathedral close to impromptu audiences, and once spent three days singing aboard a naval ship at Torquay. When of age he joined the Navy, and after two years' active service his fine tenor voice was 'discovered' by Admiral Hervey during a voyage to Saint Lucia, and, being generally admired in the Fleet, won the favour of Admiral Pigot. He took part in the Battle of the Saintes against the French Fleet in 1782.

Upon discharge in 1783 he was sent with a recommendation to George Colman at the Haymarket, but was turned away. For a while he struggled in companies at Southampton and Salisbury, before gaining a place for a few seasons under John Palmer at the Theatre Royal, Bath: he soon came to the attention of the Venanzio Rauzzini, who gave him instruction, and, much admiring his Handelian singing (notably in 'Total Eclipse' from Samson), publicly called him his scholar. He first sang at Vauxhall Gardens in London, his songs of James Hook being found appropriate and pleasing, in summer 1786: In 1787 Charles Dibdin mentions him as an established singer there. On 12 January 1791 he sang before Josef Haydn at a meeting of the Anacreontic Club.

== Covent Garden ==
Thomas Harris heard Incledon at Bath, and engaged him, at first for three years, for Covent Garden. In accepting this offer the tenor narrowly missed a better one – for higher fees and a longer term – made soon afterwards by Thomas Linley. Incledon kept his agreement however, although his experiences with Covent Garden were not always of the happiest. He made a successful debut there in 1790 as Dermont in The Poor Soldier by William Shield, who became a lifelong friend and associate. In February 1791 he appeared in Shield's opera The Woodman, being universally encored in his ballad 'The streamlet', and with Charles Bannister in the same cast singing 'Much more a helpless woman'. In 1793 he made a short Easter tour with Bowden, Mrs Martyr and the oboeist William Parke, to Portsmouth, where they were very well received. February 1794 introduced him in Shield's The travellers in Switzerland in a cast with Miss Poole, Mrs Martyr and Mr Fawcet; and in April in a new work, Netly Abbey (a compilation from various composers) Incledon sang Shield's old song 'The Arethusa', which he had already made his own.

Incledon's performances, and Shield's new operas, 'made him so popular that for several years he travelled in the summer, and at every considerable town in England gave an entertainment consisting of recitation and songs (on Dibdin's plan), with great applause and profit.' At Covent Garden a notable production was the revival of The Beggar's Opera in October 1797, with Madame Mara (engaged for twelve nights at huge cost) as Polly and Mrs Martyr as Lucy. Incledon was thought unrivalled as MacHeath. In 1800 the two-act Paul and Virginia (music by Mazzinghi and Reeve) gave Incledon two pieces, one a spirited air with oboe obbligato, and the other, 'Our Country is our Ship' by Townshend won him a general encore. In 1800 also he earned the distinction of singing in the London premiere of Haydn's The Creation on 28 March in the composer's presence. The Oratorios at Covent Garden in 1801 commenced with Mozart's Requiem and Handel's L'allegro ed il pensieroso. Incledon's laugh, in his singing of 'Haste thee, Nymph' was so infectious that the audience joined in with him.

In February the following year, Thomas Arne's opera Love in a Village was revived for Mrs. Billington, into which she introduced William Boyce's duet 'Together let us range the fields' for herself and Incledon, which was loudly encored. In the same month was presented a new comic opera written by Dibdin, The Cabinet (the music by various composers), in which Incledon appeared together with John Braham and Nancy Storace, and in delivering the hunting song 'his fine volume of voice filled the whole theatre'. Incledon's MacHeath was reprised at Margate in August 1803. Another new Dibdin opera, The British Fleet in 1342 (music entirely by Braham) appeared in December, and on that evening the highlight was a duet by Braham and Incledon, 'All's Well', which was encored.

At Covent Garden, Incledon successfully took on as a tenor several important roles created by his friend the celebrated bass Charles Bannister, about a generation after the original productions. Thus he appeared as Tom Tug in Dibdin's The Waterman (first presented at the Haymarket in 1774) and in 1809 took the role of Mr. Steady in Dibdin's The Quaker (first presented at Drury Lane in 1777). In 1810, similarly, he appeared as the Serjeant in Isaac Bickerstaffe's musical entertainment of The Recruiting Serjeant (formerly produced at the Royalty Theatre in 1789, first 1770), and in 1814 as Mr. Belville (another Bannister role) in Mrs Brook's opera Rosina (presented first at Covent Garden in 1783). Since the airs or ballads in these musical dramas stood alone with spoken dialogue, the transposition from bass to tenor did not create excessive difficulty.

After singing in that theatre for many years, and after several disagreements with Harris, he finally withdrew, and 'soon after took a parting benefit at the Italian Opera House, at play-house prices, assisted by many of his brethren of both theatres, to a house filled to an excess that proved how highly his talents were appreciated.'

== The singer among his contemporaries ==
Incledon sang both in opera and in oratorio, but his chief popularity lay in his delivery of ballads ('not the modern sentimental composition, but of the robust old school'), such as The Lass of Richmond Hill, Sally in our Alley, Black-eyed Susan, The Arethusa, and anything of a bold and manly type. He enjoyed a popularity of twenty-five or thirty years' duration.He was a forthright man, given to speaking his mind openly, which also showed itself in the freedom and natural expression of his singing, and he had vocal resources to sustain the flights of interpretative impulse which enlivened his performances. A somewhat vain man, who affected gold jewellery and snuff-box, he regarded himself (not entirely without cause) as the 'English Ballad Singer.' Edward Fitzball, who as a lad saw him play Macheath, remembered him being very fat, with an immense white cravat in which his chin seemed buried, his costume a blue dress coat with gilt buttons, a white waistcoat, leather 'smalls' and top boots.

His friendship and professional involvement with William Shield, from his first days at Covent Garden, set the character of his career. He and Shield, Charles Bannister, Charles Dignum, 'Jack' Johnstone, Charles Ashley and William Parke in 1793 formed themselves into 'The Glee Club', a set which met on Sunday evenings during the season at the Garrick's Head Coffee House in Bow Street, once a fortnight, for singing among themselves and dining together. Many of Shield's songs were either written for him or were sung by him, with the composer's high approval. Shield said of him that, not only did Incledon's interpretation of the songs he had written for him never disappoint his expectation, but that he often brought a grace, beauty and charm to them which the composer had not imagined to be present in his own work, and that a large share of the popularity of those songs might be credited to Incledon's unrivalled excellence in singing them. Many songs were written for him also by George Baker (1773–1847), the composer and organist of Stafford and Derby, who had been a fellow-pupil of Incledon's under Jackson at Exeter.

Of these friends, Charles Dignum was the singer whose range and repertoire most nearly resembled his own. Like him, Dignum took Dibdin roles such as The Waterman. It was said of Incledon that he gave to everything his own reading, and though he had rivals, his own distinctive style and character never had any true successors. He was regarded as a master of a certain declamatory recitation style exemplified by The Storm by G.A. Stevens, a stentorian ballad of near-shipwreck requiring much range of volume and vocal colour. His performance of this piece greatly contributed to his success at Portsmouth in 1793, caused Mrs Siddons to sob like a child, and astonished John Kemble at that great actor's retirement dinner. His background in the naval sea-song genre, and experience of seafaring, no doubt coloured his delivery and gave it authenticity, just as he never lost his Cornish accent.

Incledon's greatest rival, or peer (for it was 'a rivalry in name rather than reality'), was John Braham. Braham, in addition to his own experience as a cantor, owed a great deal to the refined Italian vocal methods taught by his master, the male soprano Venanzio Rauzzini. Incledon, who had also received instruction from Rauzzini, was decidedly English in his musical outlook and had little time for foreign music, or for people who enthused about songs the words of which they did not understand. The continuing contest between Italian and English styles of composition and singing found an epitome in the materials and style of Incledon and Braham, which, in an age of nationalistic feeling, prompted unworthy anti-semitic commentaries in some quarters against Braham. Incledon himself, however, was good-hearted but of irritable humour, and was easily teased into a fury about the "Italianized humbug" of Braham's style of singing.

The faultless sweetness and perfection of Samuel Harrison (who sang mostly in oratorio and ballad concerts) lacked the warmth, spontaneity and declamatory power of Incledon, who sang principally on the stage. Michael Kelly, despite his 'Hibernian elasticity', and his association with very distinguished European musicians, owed his later popular favour as much to his useful endeavours in theatrical management, but as a singer in the English mould was less substantial.

The story is told that Incledon, after singing at a gala night at the Theatre Royal, Bury St Edmunds, had a highly convivial evening at the Angel Hotel, during which he gave grave offence to a military gentleman by disparaging his account of an escapade under arms. The next morning the infuriated officer forced his way into Incledon's rooms to demand satisfaction by way of a duel. Incledon, who was roused from his slumbers and had no recollection of what he might have said, responded that he should certainly give him satisfaction, and then and there sang the whole of Richard Leveridge's song "Black-eyed Susan", to such effect that all present were moved to tears. "There, my fine fellow", he said to the officer, "that has satisfied thousands, let it satisfy you"; "and putting forth his hand, it was as generously taken, as offered, and the affair was ended."

== Descriptions of the voice ==
According to Baring-Gould in 1908: he ‘had a voice of uncommon power and sweetness, both in the natural and falsetto. The former was from A to G, a compass of about fourteen notes; the latter he could use from D to E or even F, or about ten notes. His natural voice was full and open, and of such ductility, that when he sang pianissimo it retained its original quality. His falsetto was rich, sweet, and brilliant, and totally unlike the other. He could use it with facility, and execute in it ornaments of a certain class with volubility and sweetness. His shake was good, and his intonation much more correct than is common to singers so imperfectly educated... When Rauzzini first heard him at Bath, rolling his voice upwards like a surge of the sea, till, touching the top note it expired in sweetness, he exclaimed in rapture...'

In 1829 it was recalled: 'The splendour and sweetness of his voice yet rings in our ears. It combined every excellence of which the vocal organ is capable. Powerful, brilliant, sweet, liquid, rich – it flowed out and onward like a torrent; while its correct intonation, and singularly melodious quality, made its most subdued tones effective. Incledon was nature's songster.'

== Later career ==
In 1811, having come to a severance with Covent Garden, Incledon planned to go to America. The comedian Charles Mathews had defended him against the falsehoods put up against Incledon by the theatre managers, and now agreed to embark with him on a provincial tour to Rochester, Canterbury, Margate, Sandwich, Brighton, Chichester, Portsmouth, Cheltenham, Bath, Derby, Hull, York, Wakefield, Doncaster and Sheffield and indeed to Ireland, with an entertainment called 'Mail-coach Adventures'. The Mathews Memoir includes several entertaining anecdotes of the singer, showing that in many respects he remained childlike all his life, simultaneously generous and parsimonious, and given to hard swearing on all occasions, a person whose escapades and eccentricities were very amusing in retrospect once the embarrassment which they at first caused had passed. By January 1812 Mathews and Incledon had agreed to discontinue their association finally and absolutely, but Incledon regretted it and sought a reconciliation. 'Mr Incledon, although universally allowed to possess great goodness of heart, was nevertheless a very unfit ally to a man of professional habits, for of such habits Mr Incledon had no idea.' In a letter to an intermediary, Mathews concluded 'as to meeting Incledon again, "never shall sun that morrow see".'

In 1817, by which time his powers were somewhat diminished, he toured in North America; he is said to have made £5000 by the expedition. He appeared at the Park Theatre, New York, in October 1817 as Hawthorn in Love in a Village (which was not very well received) and left that city a year later. In 1819 he appeared as Robin Hood in the burletta Robin Hood and Little John at the Surrey Theatre with Rosemond Mountain as Maid Marian.

On retiring from the operatic stage, at the English Opera House in April 1822, he travelled through the provinces with an entertainment called The Wandering Melodist. He retired to live at Prospect Place, in Brighton, where he founded and occupied himself with the Brighton Glee Club. He suffered a serious illness in 1823: his offer to assist at the opening of the Chain Pier by singing 'Rule Britannia' and the National Anthem was declined. He recovered sufficiently to sing again, but at a recital on 15 October 1824, at Southampton, he announced that this should be his last appearance on any stage. He was in Worcester when a second attack of paralysis proved fatal.

== Portraits ==
There are several likenesses of Incledon:

- Oil Portrait of Charles Incledon by Martin Archer Shee.
- Charles Incledon, pencil and red chalk drawing by George Dance the Younger, 1798.
- Engraving of Charles Incledon as Mr Steady in Dibdin's The Quaker, by Thomas Woolnoth after Thomas Charles Wageman, published 1820.
- Lithograph of Charles Incledon as he appeared singing "The Storm", by William Kenneth after Joseph Ayton (published 1826).
- Mr Incledon in the character of a sailor singing "The Storm", engraving by Piercy Roberts after John Emery, c. 1800–1810.
- Five additional engravings of Incledon in Cornell University Library Collection.
- Mr Incledon as Macheath, engraving by J. Thompson after Singleton, 1816.
- Mr Incledon, engraved by K Mackenzie from a drawing by Dighton.
- A portrait of Incledon as Macheath, by Thomas Clater, is mentioned in the Braham Collection in 1871.
- Incledon appears as the singer in 10 Broadside Ballads in the Bodleian Library Collection.

== See also ==
- Charles Benjamin Incledon, advertiser from the 18th century
