= Clater =

Clater is a surname. Notable people with the surname include:

- Francis Clater (1756–1823), British farrier and writer
- John Clater Aldridge, MP
- Thomas Clater (1789–1867), English painter

== See also ==
- Slater (surname)
