= Clutter =

Clutter may refer to:

== Chaos ==
- Clutter (advertising), numerous promotions in media, unrelated to the main presentation
- Clutter (radar), unwanted echoes in electronic systems
- Chart clutter, redundant components in charts and graphs
- Visual clutter, or visual pollution
- Cluttering, a speech and communication disorder when speech becomes broken or sounds nervous

== Other ==
- Clutter (album), a 2007 album by Laki Mera
- Clutter, a Sperner family of sets (i.e., no set in the family contains any other)
- Clutter (surname)
