= Charles Bannister =

English actor, comedian and singer

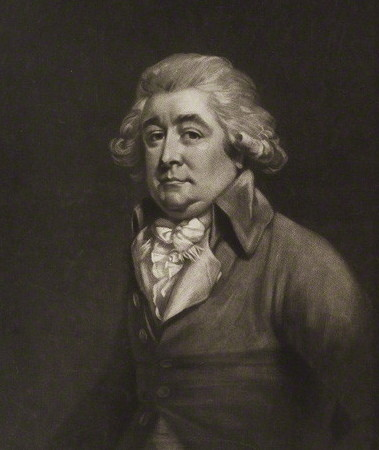
Charles Bannister Comedian

Charles Bannister (1738–1804) was an English actor, comedian and singer.

== Origins and debut ==
Bannister was born in Gloucestershire. When he was seven his father moved to Deptford. He was possessed of 'a manly form, an ardent mind, and an uncommon flow of wit.' He a company of players who visited his neighbourhood, and aspired to their profession. At 18 he made amateur appearances in Romeo and Juliet and Richard III in Deptford. Drury Lane turned him down, but after successful work in Norwich, Ipswich and other eastern towns, Samuel Foote gave him his first London appearance in 1762 at the Haymarket Theatre, as Will Tirehack in The Orators, opposite John Palmer as Harry Scamper, who also made his debut on that occasion. Bannister remained Palmer's friend thereafter with 'manly firmness and immoveable constancy'. Long afterwards, in June 1787, Palmer as manager of the Royalty Theatre attempted to present dramatic works (including As You Like It), and then other lighter entertainments of the stage, with the encouragement of Arthur Murphy, contrary to Statute. Bannister, even after the legal danger was apparent, remained with him, and was committed for trial, though the warrant was superseded.

== His career in opera ==
His skills, especially in comedy and mimicry, were quickly recognised, but the fine singing voice on which his later reputation stood was not at first in evidence. Bannister was untutored as a singer, but possessed a natural voice which united 'in extraordinary perfection the extremes of a deep bass and high-toned falsetto: and his ear, which was of great delicacy and perfection, enabled him to execute not only pieces of ordinary description, but to represent, with great humour, and without the grossness of burlesque or caricature, many leading performers of the day, both male and female.' William Parke noted that 'Bannister, who never sang out of time or out of tune, did not know one note of music. He had his songs, &c., parroted to him by a worthy friend of mine, Mr Griffith Jones, who was at that time pianist to Covent Garden Theatre.'

In 1772 it was reported that Jane Poitier, an actress who worked in the same summer company as Bannister from 1770 to 1774, was his mistress.

=== Dibdin opera roles ===
Bannister built on his reputation as a singer at Ranelagh Gardens not least through the early successful operas of Charles Dibdin, with which he became specially identified. In 1768 he was in Damon and Phillida, and The Padlock. In 1774 he was the original Tom Tug in Dibdin's lasting work, The Waterman, at its first presentation at the Haymarket. He appeared in the first production of The Cobbler, and in 1777 was the first Mr. Steady in The Quaker at Drury Lane. 'Steady, in The Quaker, has never, except in him, found an adequate representative.' He was in the premiere of The Chelsea Pensioner in 1779, and was Sergeant (opposite Charles Dibdin as Countryman, and Mrs Wrighten as Wife) in Dibdin and Isaac Bickerstaffe's musical entertainment of The Recruiting Serjeant at the Royalty Theatre in 1789. As Tom Tug, Mr Steady and the Recruiting Serjeant he was succeeded (at Covent Garden) by Charles Incledon, and by Charles Dignum, who were his friends, and adopted them for tenor voice instead of bass or baritone.

In December 1776 he brought 'his fine rich and mellow bass voice' to the two-act opera Zelima and Azore (composed by Thomas Linley and the orchestra led by Linley's son Thomas, fresh from his studies with Tartini), opposite Vernon, Dodd, and Mrs. Baddely. This was shortly before the premiere of The School for Scandal in 1777: and in October 1778 Bannister had the role of Serjeant Drill in the elder Linley's two-act musical drama The Camp (after Sheridan), with the recruiting song "Great Caesar, once renown'd in fame".

=== Shield opera premieres ===
Bannister played in the first productions of several of his friend William Shield's operas, from his early success The Flitch of Bacon at the Little Theatre, Haymarket (as Captain Wilson) in 1778, through many of his later Covent Garden successes. He was the first Mr Belville in Shield's Rosina (text by Mrs Brooke) in 1782–83, in which Mrs Bannister also appeared: his song "Her mouth, when a smile" stuck in his personal repertoire. In 1783 he was Captain Fitzroy in Shield's The Poor Soldier. In 1784 Robin Hood (text: MacNally) gave Mrs Bannister an air "The Nightingale" with oboe obbligato for Parke jnr., and to Charles Bannister the song "As burns the charger" with trumpet accompaniment. Bannister and 'Jack' Johnstone's duet "How sweet in the woodlands" was richly encored. Parke recalled Bannister singing in Shield's Fontainbleau, or, Our Way in France in 1784, and how he and Johnstone sang duets at a dinner held by Shield soon afterwards. Bannister was also in first performances of Shield's The Farmer (1787), The Highland Reel (1788) The Crusade and The Czar (both 1790), and The Woodman (1791), in the latter with both Johnstone and Incledon.

At Covent Garden a new comic opera by Hook, The Fair Peruvian, in March 1786, featured Bannister opposite the excellent Mrs Billington, who became suddenly ill during the performance. A different play being offered, Bannister, by winning a laugh, managed to placate a turbulent audience. Bannister was identified with many songs which were never bettered than in his performance of them. 'Among them may be named: "Her mouth which a smile", in Rosina; "While happy in my native land", in The Election; "Brave Admiral Benbow"; "To Anacreon in Heaven"; "When Bibo went down to the regions below"; and above all, and never to be equalled or forgotten, "Stand to your guns, my Hearts of Oak!" In this song, his diminuendo while giving the command, "Reserve your fire" – and, "not yet, nor yet," followed by the tremendous burst of his powerful voice, in the word "Fire!" produced an electrifying and appalling effect.'

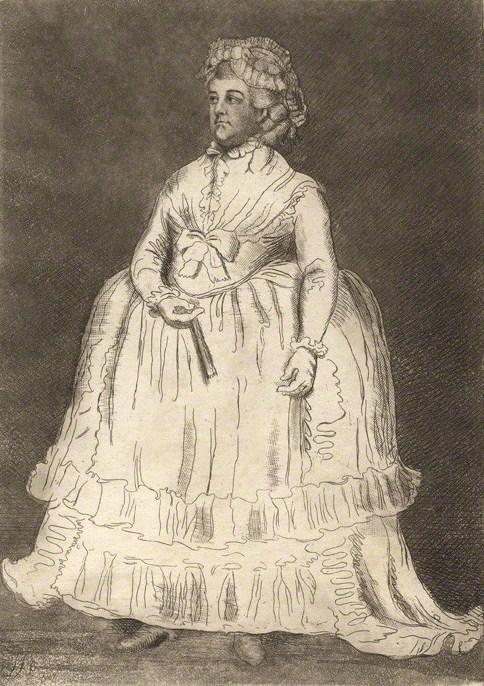
Charles Bannister as Polly Peachum

== In travesty ==
He was said to have 'one of the most extensive falsettos ever heard'. Garrick took Felice Giardini to hear Bannister's imitations of Tenducci and Champneys, and the composer observed that the mimicry was perfect, but the fault was that the mimic was better than the performers themselves. Michael Kelly refers to his appearance as Polly in a travesty of The Beggar's Opera at the Little Theatre in the Haymarket in 1781, in which he 'gave her tender airs with all the power of his deep and sonorous bass voice.' He brought it off not by mimicking feminine intonation or mincing gait, antics or 'superadded drolleries', but by the ridiculous incongruity of his deep voice and muscular frame, by an occasional display of ankle, and by the perfect judgement with which he sang Polly's songs. This was heard with great disgust by the visiting Italian male soprano Ferdinando Mazzanti, who did not realize it was a burlesque production.

== The Drama ==
He was received with such favour that David Garrick engaged him for Drury Lane. Kelly also mentions his 'admirable' appearance as Hecate in a production of Macbeth, 21 March 1794, at the opening of the New Drury Lane Theatre, in a cast led by John Kemble and Mrs Siddons, the Malcolm played by Charles Kemble in his first public appearance in London. As Hecate, Bannister was a successor to the celebrated bass Richard Leveridge (who had composed the Macbeth music about a century before and performed the role for some forty years). The Tempest gave Bannister a famous role as Caliban: 'Combining, as he did, a deep and sonorous voice both in speaking and singing, a large and vigorous person, and great force in the management of all his advantages, Charles Bannister was an exact and stupendous representative of this hag-born monster; no contemporary or successor has given so perfect a delineation. It is impossible to exceed the vigour with which he ejaculated his curses, the humility with which he worshipped the "brave god who carried the bottle", or the appalling revelry with which he made the stage tremble under him, when he shouted "Freedom! hey-day! liberty! freedom!" and thundered out his song,"Ban, ban, Ca-Caliban, Has a new master, get a new man".' 'With Charles Bannister, Shakspeare's monster died.'

== Character ==
Charles Bannister was much celebrated as a wit. He possessed, 'in high perfection, the faculty of repartee, unimpaired by any display of spleen or malevolence: his hits were therefore always well received. He was, at this time, eminently in favour with the public, upon whom his truly English style of singing and acting had made a powerful impression; he was greatly esteemed in all convivial and social circles, where his never-failing good humour and versatile talent occasioned his company to be generally courted, and among whom his affability, candour and plain integrity procured him the title of "Honest Charles Bannister".' He was, however, not very good at organizing his monetary affairs.

George Garrick was always very anxious to please his brother David, and whenever he came into the theatre he invariably asked, "Has my brother wanted me?" It so befell that George died very soon after his brother's funeral, and when the news came someone observed that this was extraordinary. "Not at all," said Charles Bannister, "His brother wanted him". Another example: 'Bannister repeats – or has invented – a very witty thing said by Jack Ketch as he was tying the halter. A culprit asked him "if he had any commands to the other world." "Why," said Jack, "not much – I'll – only -" (added he, as he adjusted the knot under his left ear) "just – trouble you – WITH A LINE".' The theatrical memoirs of the period are laced with examples of Bannister's quips and rejoinders: he seems to have been unstoppable.

According to The Epicure's Almanack, Bannister's wit earned him free room and board for life at the One Tun Tavern on Jermyn Street:

"This is one of the meritorious houses which have risen progressively from the obscurity of a chop-house to the importance of a tavern. If report may be credited, it owes its first rise to an accidental circumstance. The late Charles Bannister, of facetious memory, having, for some time, occasionally used the house, and by his wit and inexhaustible humour, attracted a crowd of company, the honest host thought fit to fix this magnet by crying quits for bed and board as long as Mr. Bannister continued his guest. The terms we believe were accepted, and the contract terminated only with the life of the comedian."

He and William Shield, Charles Incledon, Charles Dignum, 'Jack' Johnstone, Charles Ashley and William Parke (oboeist) in 1793 formed themselves into 'The Glee Club', a set which met on Sunday evenings during the season at the Garrick's Head Coffee House in Bow Street, once a fortnight, for singing among themselves and dining together. A project to erect a bust to Dr Thomas Arne, which this group proposed to fund by charitable performances, was vetoed by the management of Covent Garden.

Bannister died on 26 October 1804, after a period of illness which had kept him from the stage. In his last weeks there were several benefit performances for him, for which the managers of both principal theatres allowed their leading actors to participate without charge. 'In Ways and Means, Honest Thieves and The Rival Soldiers he had, therefore, beside his son, (Joseph) Munden, (Jack) Johnstone, (George) Bartley, (Samuel) Simmons, Mrs. Gibbs and Mrs. Davenport.' The National Portrait Gallery in London has various portraits of Charles Bannister.

His son, John Bannister, was also a famous actor and manager.
