= Jane Poitier =

British singer and dancer

- Born: 8 June 1736; St Martin in the Fields
- Died: after 1786
- Known for: Acting and singing
- Spouse(s): Joseph Vernon (annulled); Mr Thompson
- Partner: Charles Bannister

Jane Poitier (8 June 1736 - after 1786) was a British singer and dancer. She started out as a dancer but became a singer of main parts. She was known for appearing saucily dressed. She was an innocent party in a marriage where the clergy involved were transported for fourteen years.

== Life ==
Poitier was born in St Martin in the Fields in 1736. Her parents were Clermonde and Michael Poitier. Her father was a professional dancer and by the age of five she and her brother were getting reviews for their precocious dancing in Paris.

She came to national attention after she married a fellow singer, Joseph Vernon. They married at the Savoy Chapel without reading marriage banns. John Wilkinson, the incumbent of the Savoy Chapel, thought that the terms of the Marriage Act 1753, aimed at clandestine marriages, did not apply to his church as it was a royal peculiar. He ignored the act and continued to issue marriage licenses and to conduct marriages. Poitier and Vernon's marriage was the test case taken to court by the authorities.

The prosecution case against the clergy of the Chapel was taken seriously. Wilkinson was sentenced in 1756 to 14 years' transportation. He died, the following year, en route to British North America. The curate John Grierson, who had carried out the marriage, received the same sentence: Vernon had testified at the trial, and consequentially hissed off the stage. He was hissed off in the October and when he appeared again in the following January he was hissed off the stage again. The unpopular Vernon moved to Dublin, where he had further success as an actor. She used the name of Vernon, but in 1762 her "husband" returned and Poitier returned to using her former name. She caused scandal that year when she shocked the royal family in their Covent Garden box with a very low cut gown. She balanced this by tying a shoe on stage and the stalls noticed that she not wearing underwear.

In 1772 the Theatrical Biography said that the bass singer Charles Bannister who was also known as a comedian who worked in the same summer company as her from 1770 to 1774 was her lover.

Her death is not known but she was singing at Bermondsey Spa Gardens in 1786.
