= Joseph Vernon =

English actor and singer

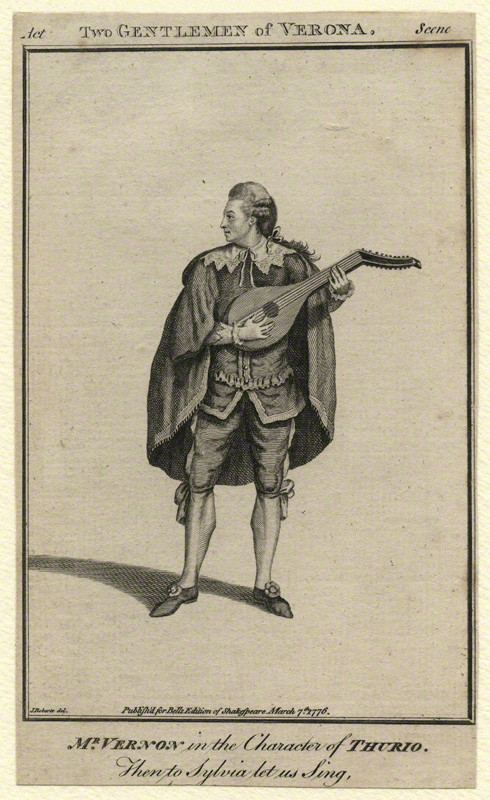
Joseph Vernon, in character as Thurio in The Two Gentlemen of Verona, 1776 engraving

Joseph Vernon (c. 1738–1782) was an English actor and singer. From his days as a boy soprano, he had a successful career on the London stage, interrupted only by the aftermath of an underage wedding to a colleague.

== Early life ==
Born at Coventry around 1738, Vernon was illegitimate. He studied in London under William Savage in the choir of St Paul's Cathedral. As a boy he had a fine soprano voice, and on 23 February 1751 he sang at Drury Lane Theatre in Thomas Arne's Alfred. On 22 May he took part in Queen Mab, the pantomime by Henry Woodward; on 20 September in the funeral procession in Romeo and Juliet; and on 19 November in The Shepherd's Lottery, an opera by William Boyce. In the early part of 1754 he sang tenor parts and acted comedy at Drury Lane.

== Scandal and exile in Dublin ==
In 1755 Vernon married Jane Poitier, a singer at Drury Lane at the Savoy Chapel. John Wilkinson, the incumbent of the Savoy Chapel, thought that the terms of the Marriage Act 1753, aimed at clandestine marriages, did not apply to his extra-parochial church, and continued to issue licenses and to solemnise marriages. Among these technically irregular weddings, Vernon's happened to be the test case taken to court by the authorities. According to Tate Wilkinson Joseph and Jane, who had been acting as "Mrs. Vernon", were happy enough to be parted.

On the other hand, the fallout of the prosecution case against the clergy of the Chapel was serious. Wilkinson was sentenced in 1756 to 14 years transportation to British North America, and died in 1757 on the way. The curate John Grierson, who had carried out the marriage, received the same sentence: Vernon had testified at the trial, and was then hissed on stage. The unpopular Vernon moved to Dublin, where he had further success as an actor.

== Return to Drury Lane ==
Back at Drury Lane in 1762, Vernon was given parts by David Garrick. He combined polished singing and a natural style of acting in Shakespeare. He was also assigned some characters in comedy and farce: Colonel Bully in The Provoked Wife; Master Stephen in Every Man in his Humour; Sir John Loverule in The Devil to Pay, a ballad opera by Charles Coffey, and Sharp in The Lying Valet by Garrick. According to James Boaden, Vernon's voice in maturity was of poor quality. Nonetheless, he continued to take singing parts in opera and interludes. The song in Act III of The School for Scandal was written by Thomas Linley for him. He took the title role in Selima and Azor, Linley's first opera.

== Last years ==
Vernon's last performances were Artabanes in Artaxerxes, First Bacchanal in Comus, and Truemore in The Lord of the Manor by Jackson of Exeter, 1780. Until 6 October 1781 he appeared in these and his older parts. He died on 19 March 1782 at Lambeth, and the administration of his effects was granted to Margaret Vernon, his widow.

== Works ==
Vernon compiled around 1782 The New London and Country Songster, or a Banquet of Vocal Music. He composed songs and ballads, including New Songs in the Pantomime of the Witches, the epilogue in Twelfth Night, and a song in the Two Gentlemen of Verona.
