= Savoy Chapel =

Anglican church in London

King's Chapel of the Savoy
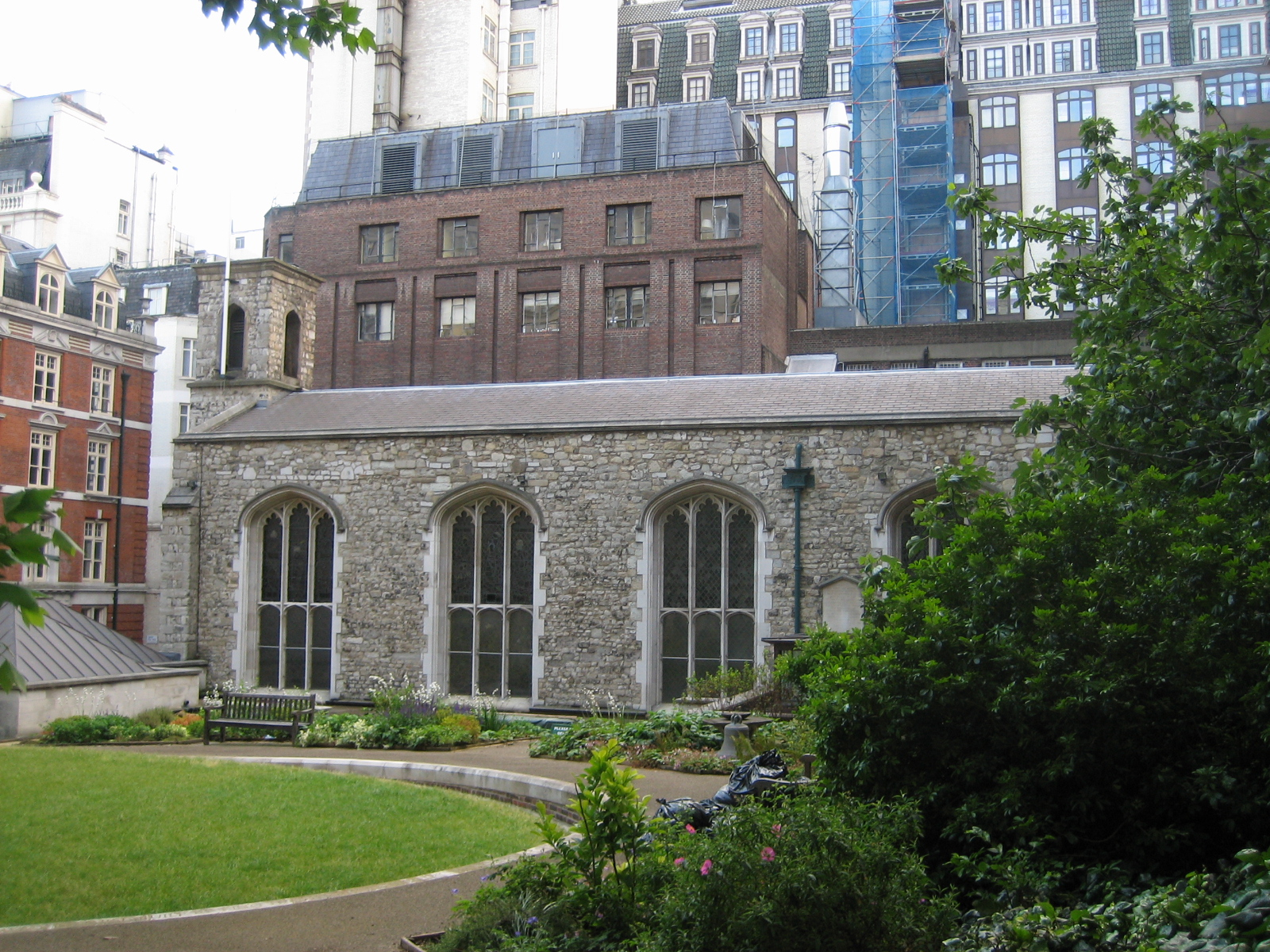
- View of the associated green and the chapel's east side, from Savoy Street

- Location within Greater London
- 51.5105°N 0.1199°W
- OS grid reference: TQ 30568 80743
- Location: Liberty of the Savoy, near Temple, London
- Country: England
- Denomination: Church of England
- Previous denomination: Lutheran; Catholic
- Website: royalchapelsavoy.org

History
- Status: Royal Peculiar

Architecture
- Functional status: Active
- Architect: Richard Griffiths Architects (renovations)
- Style: Tudor; Perpendicular
- Completed: 1512

Specifications
- Length: Nave: 200 ft (61 m)
- Materials: Stone

Administration
- Province: Canterbury
- Diocese: London (location)

Listed Building – Grade II*
- Official name: Savoy Chapel (King's Chapel of the Savoy)
- Designated: 24 February 1958
- Reference no.: 1264731

The King's Chapel of St John the Baptist in the Precinct of the Savoy, also known as the King's Chapel of the Savoy (called The Queen's Chapel during much of modern history in the reigns of Victoria and Elizabeth II), is a church in the City of Westminster, London. Facing it are 111 Strand, the Savoy Hotel, the Institution of Engineering and Technology and – across the green to its side – the east side of Savoy Street. The chapel is designated as a Grade II* listed building.

The chapel sits on the site of the Savoy Palace, once owned by the prince John of Gaunt, that was destroyed in the Peasants' Revolt of 1381. Gaunt's Duchy of Lancaster, the owner of the site of the palace, eventually came into the hands of the monarch. Work was begun on the chapel in 1502 under Henry VII and it received its first charter to operate as the chapel of a hospital foundation in 1512 to look after 100 poor and needy men of London. The hospital had fallen into ruin by the late 18th century; only the chapel survived the consequent demolition, which as to the hospital's eastern end was ceded for an approach to Waterloo Bridge.

The chapel is still owned by the Duchy of Lancaster and as such is a Royal Peculiar – outside the jurisdiction of a diocese, but under that of the reigning monarch. It is the chapel of the Royal Victorian Order, whose full gathering takes place at St George's Chapel, Windsor Castle, to accommodate those numbers. In 2016, the church was brought under the Chapel Royal for ecclesiastical purposes.

== History ==
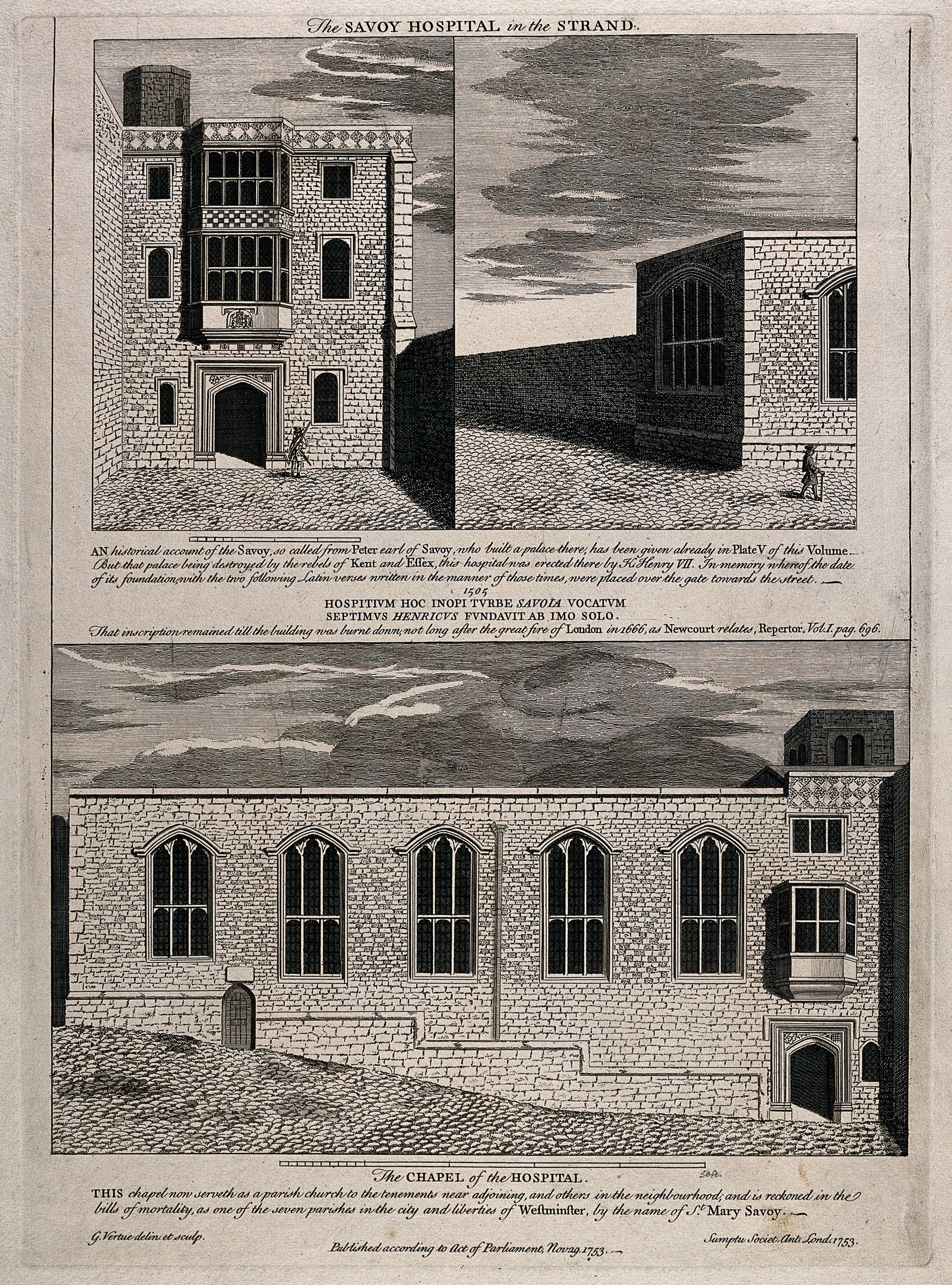
Part of the old Savoy Hospital (top) and the 'Church of St Mary Savoy' (bottom) in 1753

The chapel, originally Roman Catholic, was founded as part of Peter of Savoy's palace which was destroyed during the Peasants' Revolt of 1381. The present chapel building commenced in the 1490s (being completed in 1512) by Henry VII as a side chapel off the Savoy Hospital's 200-foot (61 m) long nave (the nave was secular rather than sacred, held 100 beds and was demolished in the 19th century).

The Savoy Chapel has hosted various other congregations, most notably that of St Mary-le-Strand whilst it had no church building of its own (1549–1714). Also the German Lutheran congregation of Westminster (now at Sandwich Street and Thanet Street, near St Pancras) was granted royal permission to worship in the chapel when it separated from Holy Trinity (the City of London Lutheran congregation now at St Mary-at-Hill). The new congregation's first pastor, Irenaeus Crusius (previously an associate at Holy Trinity), dedicated the chapel on the 19th Sunday after Trinity 1694 as the Marienkirche or the German Church of St Mary-le-Savoy. Archibald Cameron of Lochiel, the last Jacobite leader to be executed for treason, was buried there in 1753.

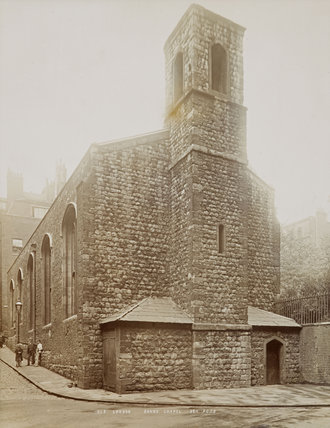
The Savoy Chapel c. 1890

An Anglican place of worship, the chapel was noted in the 18th and 19th centuries as a place where marriages without banns might occur outside of the usual parameters of ecclesiastical law of that time. In 1755 Joseph Vernon married Jane Poitier here and the curate and vicar were transported for fourteen years for carrying out an unlicensed wedding. The Rev. Henry White was the chaplain of Savoy Chapel from 1860 to 1890 and might have set a record for officiating at the marriages of actors and actresses. The Savoy Chapel was widely known during the incumbency of the Rev Hugh Chapman as a location where divorced persons were permitted to marry or to have their civil marriages blessed. Notable weddings included that of Consuelo, Duchess of Marlborough, and Lt Col Jacques Balsan in 1921 and Edith Stuyvesant Vanderbilt and Senator Peter Goelet Gerry in 1925. Chapman's successor as Chaplain, the Rev Cyril Cresswell, immediately brought an end to the marriage of divorced persons in the chapel.

In 1912, it was the scene of a suffragette wedding between Victor Duval and Una Dugdale. The wedding was attended by leading suffragettes and the wedding caused much debate because the bride refused to say "and obey", despite the intervention of the Archbishop of Canterbury.

In 1939, it was announced by the office of the Duchy of Lancaster that the Savoy Chapel would be known as The King's Chapel of the Savoy.

Many of the chapel's stained glass windows were destroyed in the London Blitz during the Second World War. However, a triptych stained glass memorial window survives which depicts a procession of angelic musicians. It is dedicated to the memory of Richard D'Oyly Carte (who was married at the chapel in 1888 and built the nearby Savoy Theatre and Savoy Hotel) and was unveiled by Sir Henry Irving in 1902; after their deaths, the names of Rupert D'Oyly Carte and Dame Bridget D'Oyly Carte were added.

== Present ==
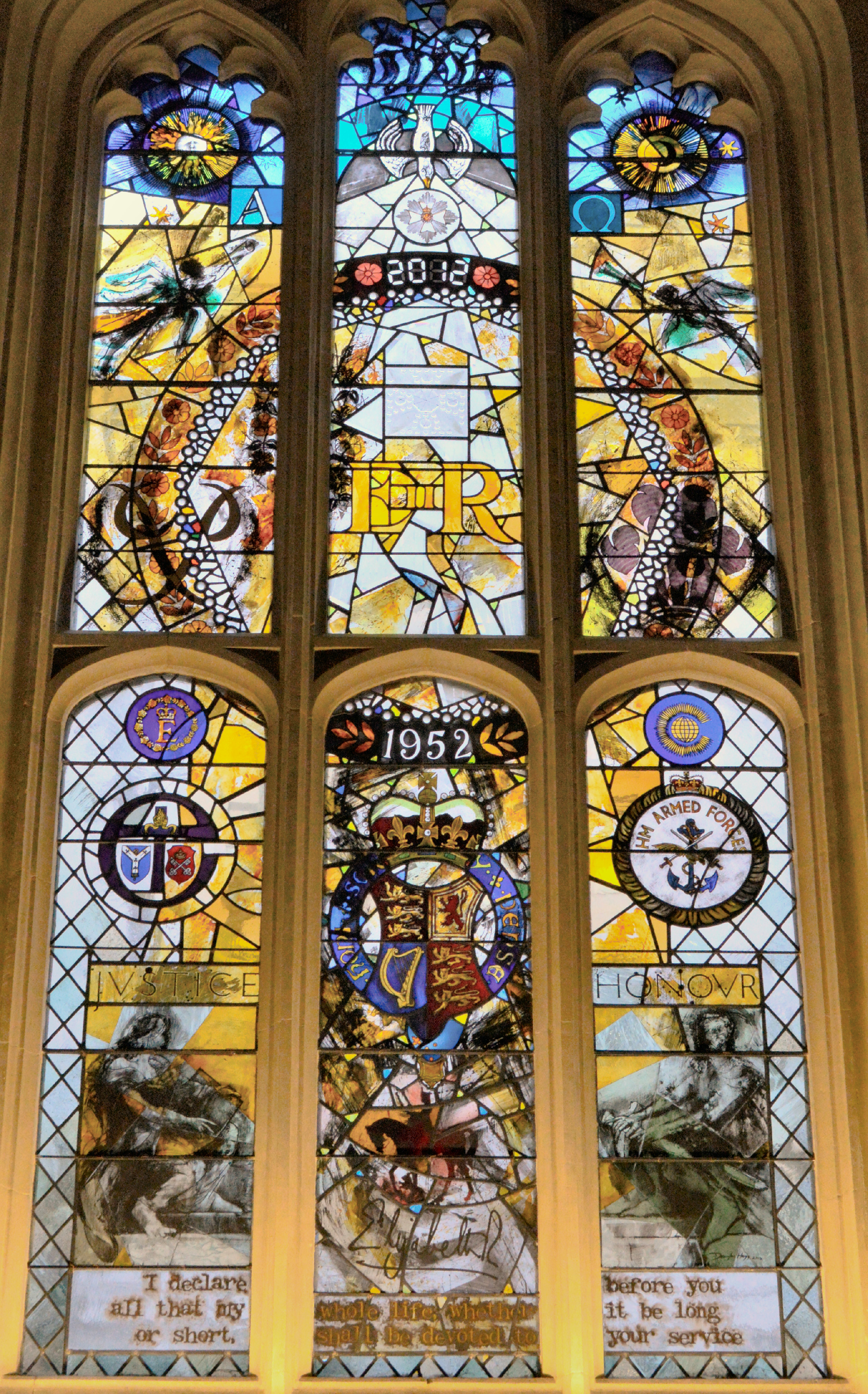
Diamond Jubilee window

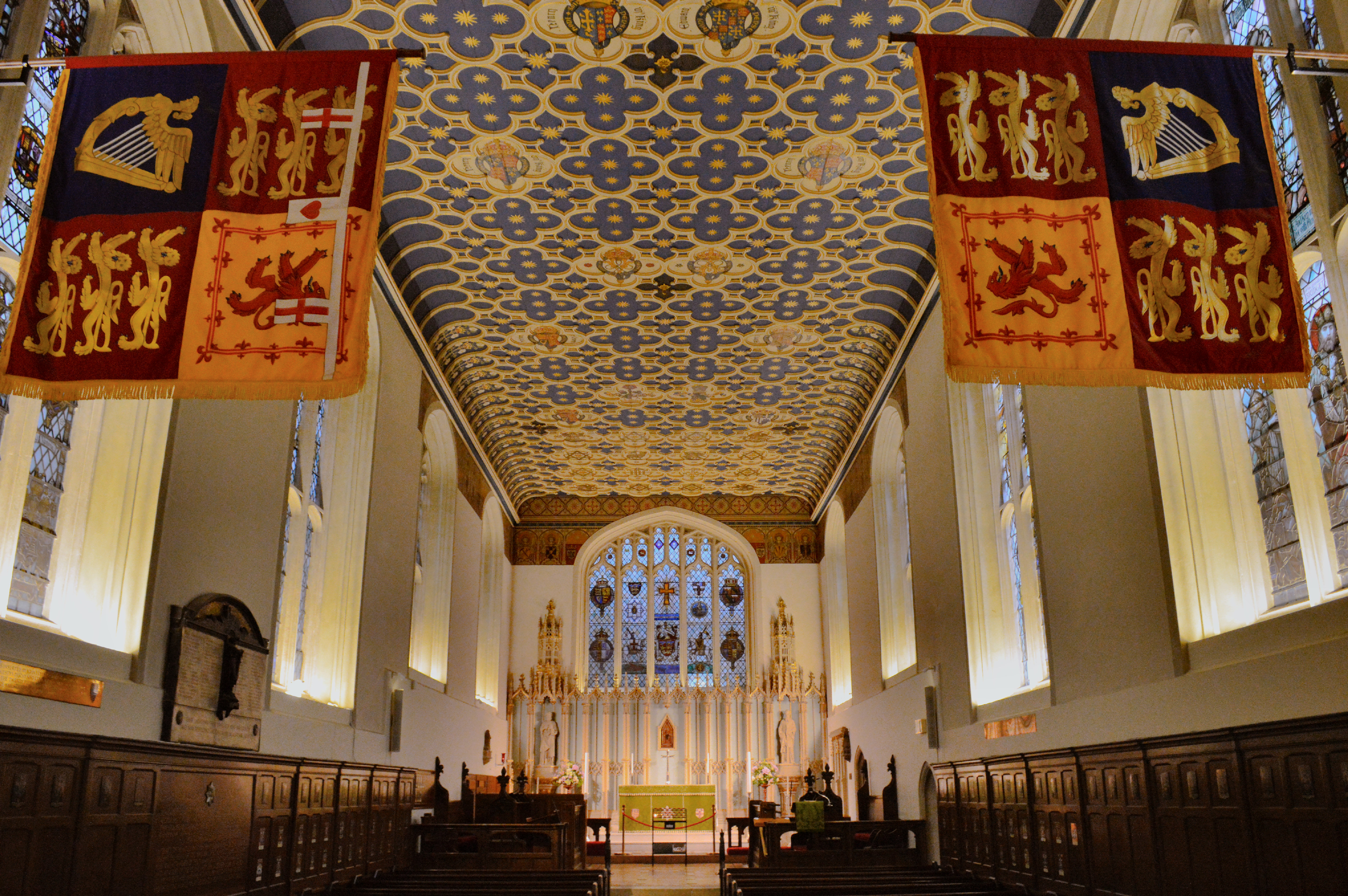
Savoy Chapel nave in 2020. The banners are those of the Sovereign (right) and of the Grand Master (left) of the Royal Victorian Order as they were then in office.

The chapel has been Crown property for centuries as part of the Savoy Hospital estate, and remains under the aegis of the monarch as part of the Duchy of Lancaster and thereby is a Royal Peculiar. It was inaugurated as a Chapel Royal in November 2016. The chaplain is appointed by the Duchy (and since 1937 as ex-officio chaplain of the Royal Victorian Order) and effectively it is the "parish church" of the Savoy Estate, the Duchy of Lancaster's principal London landholding. Armorial plates commemorating GCVOs past and present are displayed throughout the chapel; the Royal Victorian Order's present Honorary Genealogist is David White, Somerset Herald.

Most of the chapel's costs and maintenance are met by the Duchy of Lancaster, with recent works including landscaping of its garden in honour of the Golden Jubilee of Queen Elizabeth II in 2002 and restoration of the chapel ceiling in 1999. The chapel was further refurbished and a new stained-glass window commemorating the Diamond Jubilee of Queen Elizabeth II was unveiled by The Queen in November 2012.

== Music ==
=== Organ ===
The Chapel possesses a three-manual pipe organ, presented by Queen Elizabeth II, constructed to the specifications of the previous Master of the Music, William Cole and manufactured by J. W. Walker & Sons Ltd. The organ casework was designed by Arthur Bedford Knapp-Fisher (1888–1965). It was dedicated on 27 October 1965 at a service attended by the Queen to commemorate the 700th anniversary of the Duchy of Lancaster.

=== Organists ===
The current Master of the Music is Philip Berg (since 1995); the sub-organist is Justin Luke (since 2002). Previous Masters of the Music include Henry Bromley Derry (from c. 1913 to 1954) and William Cole (from 1954 to 1994).

=== Choir ===
The choir is rooted in the English cathedral tradition, and consists of up to 21 boy choristers (aged ten upwards) and six professional gentlemen. The trebles are drawn exclusively from St Olave's Grammar School in Orpington. Each year up to four prospective year-six pupils are selected to sing as trebles in the choir (after passing an academic and vocal test), with their place at St Olave's confirmed for the following year. Some choristers also join in year 7, during their first year at St Olave's. Choristers are expected to stay in the choir until their voices change and are required attend rehearsals three times a week at school and once a week at the chapel itself. The boy trebles, who have entered through the test in year 6, are known as Wakeham choristers in recognition of the 49 years of association that Michael Wakeham had with the Choir. The choir sings weekly Sunday morning services of either Eucharist or Matins, as well as those on Christmas and Easter Day. They also sing for various weddings, carol services and royal events throughout the year.

London Choir School provided all the choristers to Savoy Chapel between 1915 and 1952.

== In popular culture ==
The Savoy Chapel is mentioned in Evelyn Waugh's 1946 novel Brideshead Revisited where the venue for the marriage of Julia Flyte and Rex Mottram is discussed: "Oh, Charles, what a squalid wedding! The Savoy Chapel was the place where divorced couples got married in those days—a poky little place not at all what Rex had intended. I wanted just to slip into a registry office one morning and get the thing over with a couple of char-women as witnesses, but nothing else would do but Rex had to have bridesmaids and orange blossom and the Wedding March. It was gruesome." Bob Dylan stood at the chapel's south-west corner for the promotional film of his song "Subterranean Homesick Blues," with the narrow street Savoy Steps in the background.
