= Henry White (priest, born 1833) =

Priest and chaplain

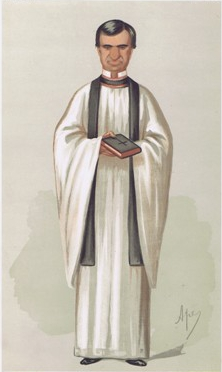
"Prayers". Caricature of Henry White by Spy in Vanity Fair in December 1874

Rev. Henry White (1833 – 7 October 1890, London) was a priest of the Church of England and the chaplain of the Queen's Chapel of the Savoy.

After education at King's College London and Worcester College, Oxford, Henry White was ordained deacon in 1859 and priest in 1860 by the then Archbishop of Canterbury John Bird Sumner. White's first curacy was at Dover, but in 1860 Queen Victoria appointed him to the chaplaincy of the Chapel Royal, Savoy, where he ministered until his death at age 56. He was appointed Hon. Chaplain-in-Ordinary to the Queen in 1870 and Chaplain-in-Ordinary to the Queen in 1873. From 1869 to 1874 White was Chaplain to the House of Commons and was reappointed in 1889.

Mr. White is the Alban Butler of the Anglican Church, although he has not formulated his peculiar knowledge into bulky volumes, but he knows, mentally, all that these chroniclers of the Saints have left on closely written pages and in unedited manuscript. It would be a rare occurrence if Mr. White were to pencil a sermon without introducing the names of a galaxy of the Fathers of the Church, Ambrose, Augustine, Basil, Cyril, and Bonaventure seeming to be especial favourites of the Chaplain of the Savoy.

Mr. White was in great request as an officiant at marriages, and the kind of confidential manner in which he addressed brides and bridegrooms was very impressive. ... He had a great many acquaintances among members of the theatrical profession, and in music, the drama, and literature he took an intelligent interest. He was very fond of travelling, and always threw off his clerical attire when off duty.

On Sunday 11 October 1891 the Henry White Memorial Window by Clayton and Bell was unveiled at the Royal Chapel, Savoy.
