= Leonard McNally =

Irish barrister, playwright, and spy (1752–1820)

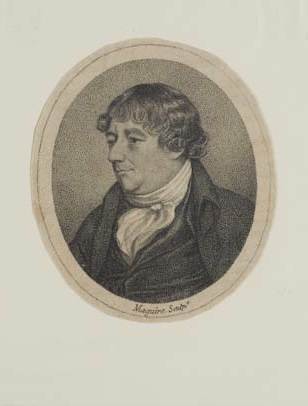
- Leo. MacNally Esq.
- Born: 27 September 1752; Dublin, Kingdom of Ireland
- Died: 13 February 1820 (aged 68); Dublin, United Kingdom
- Burial place: Donnybrook, County Dublin, Ireland
- Spouses: Mary O'Brien (m. 1783; d. 1786) Frances l'Anson (m. 1787; d. 1795) Louisa Edgeworth (m. 1799)

Leonard McNally or MacNally (27 September 1752 – 13 February 1820) was an Irish barrister, playwright, lyricist, founding member of the United Irishmen and spy for the British Government within Irish republican circles.

He was a successful lawyer in late 18th and early 19th century Dublin, and wrote a law book that was crucial in the development of the "beyond reasonable doubt" standard in criminal trials. However, during his time, he was best known for his popular comic operas and plays, together with his most enduring work, the romantic song "The Lass of Richmond Hill". He is now mainly remembered as a very important informer for the British government within the Irish revolutionary society, the United Irishmen and played a major role in the defeat of the Irish Rebellion of 1798. In return for payments from the government, McNally would betray his United Irishmen colleagues to the authorities and then, as defence counsel at their trial, secretly collaborate with the prosecution to secure a conviction. His notable republican clients included Napper Tandy, Wolfe Tone, Robert Emmet and Lord Edward FitzGerald.

== Early life ==
McNally was born in Dublin in 1752, the son of a merchant and wine importer. He was raised by his mother with the support of his uncle. McNally was born into a Roman Catholic family, but at some point in the 1760s he converted to the Church of Ireland. He was passionate about theatre, entirely self-educated and initially became a merchant in Bordeaux like his father.

However, in 1774 he went to London to study law at the Middle Temple but returned to Dublin to be called to the Irish bar in 1776. After returning to London in the late 1770s he qualified as a barrister in England, as well, in 1783. He practised for a short time in London, and, while there, supplemented his income by writing plays and editing The Public Ledger.

== Career ==
=== Radical lawyer ===
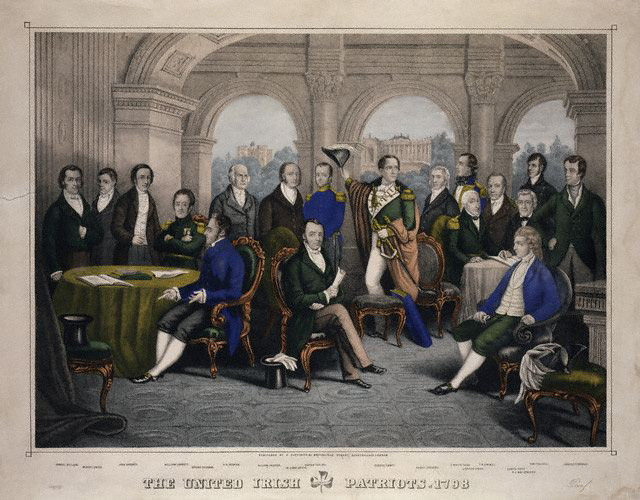
The leadership of the United Irishmen

Returning to Ireland, McNally developed a successful career as a barrister in Dublin. He developed an expertise in the law of evidence and, in 1802, published what became a much-used textbook, The Rules of Evidence on Pleas of the Crown. The text played a crucial role in defining and publicising the beyond reasonable doubt standard for criminal trials.

Not long after returning to Ireland, he became involved in radical politics, having already, in 1782, published a pamphlet in support of the Irish cause. He became Dublin's leading radical lawyer of the day. In 1792, he represented Napper Tandy, a radical member of the Irish Parliament, in a legal dispute over parliamentary privilege. In the early 1790s, McNally became a founder member of the United Irishmen, a clandestine society which soon developed into a revolutionary Irish republican organisation. He ranked high in its leadership and acted as the organisation's chief lawyer, representing many United Irishmen in court. This included defending Wolfe Tone and Robert Emmet, the leaders of the 1798 and 1803 rebellions respectively, at their trials for treason. In 1793, McNally was wounded in a duel with Sir Jonah Barrington, who had insulted the United Irishmen. Barrington subsequently described McNally as "a good-natured, hospitable, talented and dirty fellow". John O'Keeffe described McNally as having "a handsome, expressive countenance and alive sparkling eyes".

=== Informer and government agent ===
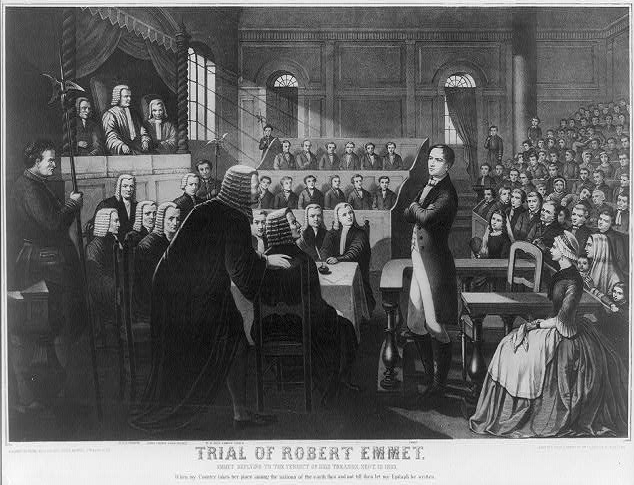
A 19th century depiction of Robert Emmet's trial

After his death in 1820, it emerged that McNally had for many years been an informant for the government, and one of the most successful British spies in Irish republican circles that there has ever been. When, in 1794, a United Irishmen plot to seek aid from Revolutionary France was uncovered by the British government, McNally turned informer to save himself, although, subsequently, he also received payment for his services. McNally was paid an annual pension in respect of his work as an informer of £300 a year, from 1794 until his death in 1820.

From 1794, McNally systematically informed on his United Irishmen colleagues, who often gathered at his house for meetings. It was McNally that betrayed Lord Edward FitzGerald, one of the leaders of the 1798 rebellion, as well as Robert Emmet in 1803. A significant factor in the failure of the 1798 rebellion was the efficacious intelligence provided to the government by its agents. McNally was considered to be one of the most damaging informers.

The United Irishmen represented by McNally at their trials were invariably convicted and McNally was paid by the crown for passing the secrets of their defence to the prosecution. During the trial of Emmet, McNally provided details of the defence's strategy to the crown and conducted his client's case in a way that would assist the prosecution. For example, three days before the trial he assured the authorities that Emmet "does not intend to call a single witness, nor to trouble any witness for the Crown with a cross-examination, unless they misrepresent facts… He will not controvert the charge by calling a single witness". For his assistance to the prosecution in Emmet's case, he was paid a bonus of £200, on top of his pension, half of which was paid five days before the trial.

After McNally's death, his activities as a government agent became generally known when his heir attempted to continue to collect his pension of £300 per year. He is still remembered with opprobrium by Irish nationalists. In 1997, the Sinn Féin newspaper, An Phoblacht in an article on McNally, described him as "undoubtedly one of the most treacherous informers of Irish history".

=== Playwright and lyricist ===
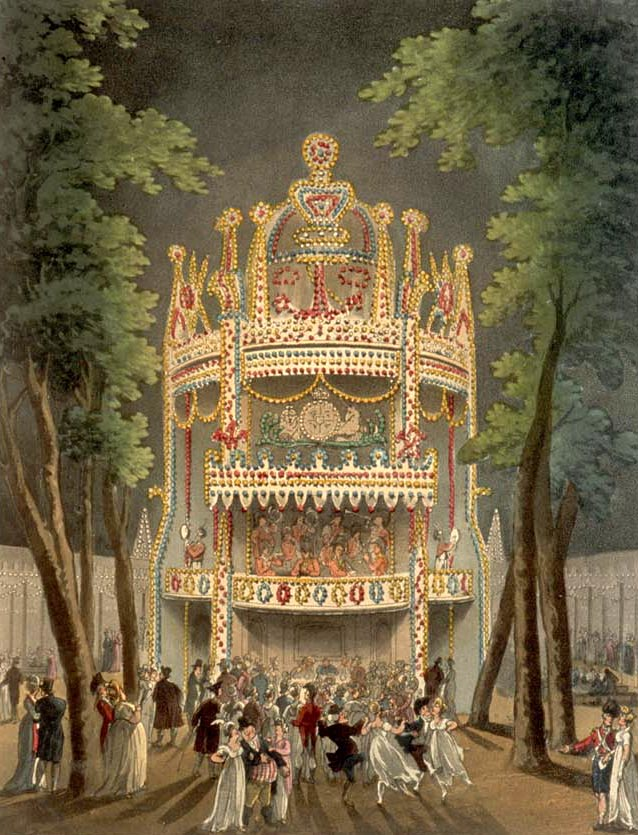
Vauxhall Gardens, where McNally's song, The Lass of Richmond Hill, was first performed in 1789.

McNally was a successful dramatist and wrote a number of well-constructed but derivative comedies, as well as comic operas. His first dramatic work was The Ruling Passion, a comic opera written in 1771, and he is known to have authored at least twelve plays between 1779 and 1796 as well as other comic operas. His works include The Apotheosis of Punch (1779), a satire on the Irish playwright Richard Brinsley Sheridan, Tristram Shandy (1783), which was an adaptation of Lawrence Sterne's novel, Robin Hood (1784), Fashionable Levities (1785), Richard Cœur de Lion (1786), and Critic Upon Critic (1788).

He also wrote a number of songs and operettas for Covent Garden. One of his songs, Sweet Lass of Richmond Hill, became very well-known and popular following its first public performance at Vauxhall Gardens in London in 1789. It was said to be a favourite of George III and popularised the romantic metaphor "a rose without a thorn", a phrase which McNally had used in the song.

== Personal life and family ==
Nothing is known of McNally's first wife Mary O'Brien, other than that she died in 1786. In London in 1787, McNally eloped with Frances I'Anson, as her father William I'Anson a solicitor, disapproved of McNally. Frances, and her family's estate, Hill House in Richmond, Yorkshire, was the subject of a song with lyrics by McNally and composed by James Hook, Sweet Lass of Richmond Hill. In 1795, Frances died during child birth at age 29 and was survived by only one daughter. In 1799, McNally married his third wife Louisa Edgeworth, the daughter of a clergyman from County Longford, and with his third wife he had at least three sons.

When his son, who had the same professions, died on 13 February 1820, it was widely reported to have been McNally. The son was buried in Donnybrook, Dublin on 17 February 1820, and McNally sent a letter on 6 March 1820 (from 20 Cuffe Street, Dublin) to the Proprietor of 'Saunders's Newsletter' seeking damages for the severe injury caused by the circulation of his death. In June 1820, McNally was on his deathbed, and although he had been a Protestant for most of his adult life, he sought absolution from a Roman Catholic priest, and was also buried in Donnybrook on 8 June 1820.

== Bibliography ==
The most extensive modern study on McNally is:

- Bartlett, Thomas (2001). "The life and opinions of Leonard MacNally". In Morgan, Hiram (ed.). Information, media & power through the ages. University College Dublin Press. pp. 113–136. ISBN 978-1900621625.

See also

- Chisholm, Hugh, ed. (1911). "MacNally, Leonard" . Encyclopædia Britannica. Vol. 17 (11th ed.). Cambridge University Press. p. 265.
- Rigg, James McMullen (1893). "MacNally, Leonard" . In Lee, Sidney (ed.). Dictionary of National Biography. Vol. 35. London: Smith, Elder & Co.
- Evans, Mihail Dafydd. "Macnally, Leonard (1752–1820)". Oxford Dictionary of National Biography (online ed.). Oxford University Press. doi:10.1093/ref:odnb/17707. (Subscription or UK public library membership required.)
