= Clutter (surname) =

Clutter is a surname. Notable people with the surname include:

- Clutter family, victims of the 1959 Clutter family murders
- Bill Clutter, American private investigator, wrongful conviction advocate, and author
- Mary Clutter, American plant biologist
