= The Lass of Richmond Hill =

18th-century song

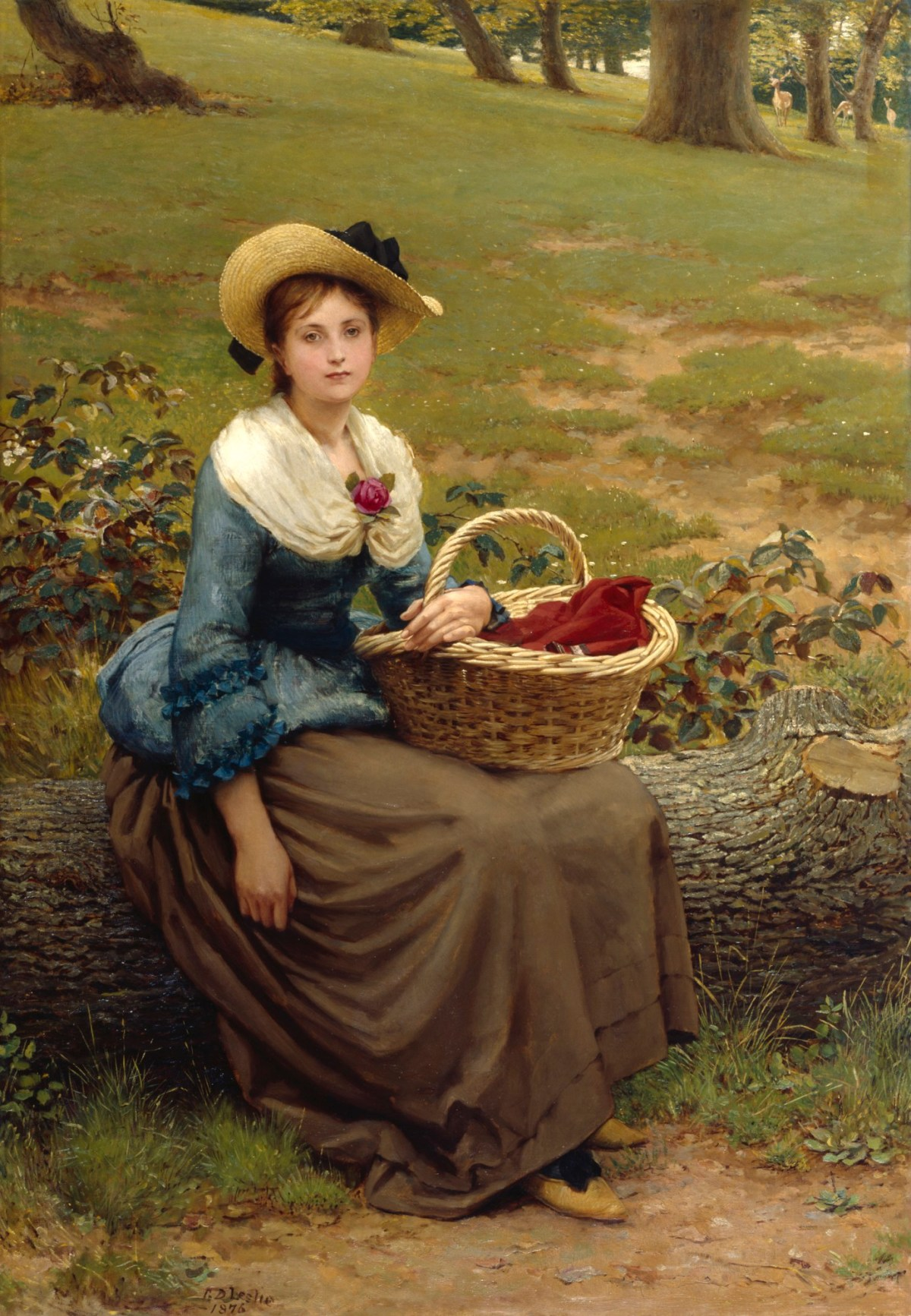
The Lass of Richmond Hill, the 1877 painting by George Dunlop Leslie inspired by the song

"The Lass of Richmond Hill", also known as "The Sweet Lass of Richmond Hill", is a song written by Leonard McNally with music composed by James Hook, and was first publicly performed in 1789. It was said to be a favourite of George III and, at one time, was thought to have been written by his son, George IV. It is a love ballad which popularized the poetic phrase "a rose without a thorn" as a romantic metaphor. Associated with the English town of Richmond in North Yorkshire, it is now often mistakenly considered to be a traditional folk song, and has been assigned the number 1246 on the Roud Folk Song Index. The music is also used as a military march by the British army.

== Lyric ==
The words were written by Leonard McNally (1752–1820), who was a Dublin barrister, playwright, a leader of the United Irishmen (a clandestine republican Irish revolutionary society), but also a double agent for the British Government. McNally would betray his United Irishmen colleagues to the authorities and then, as defence counsel at their trial, secretly collaborate with the prosecution to secure a conviction. He wrote a number of songs and operettas, including for Covent Garden.

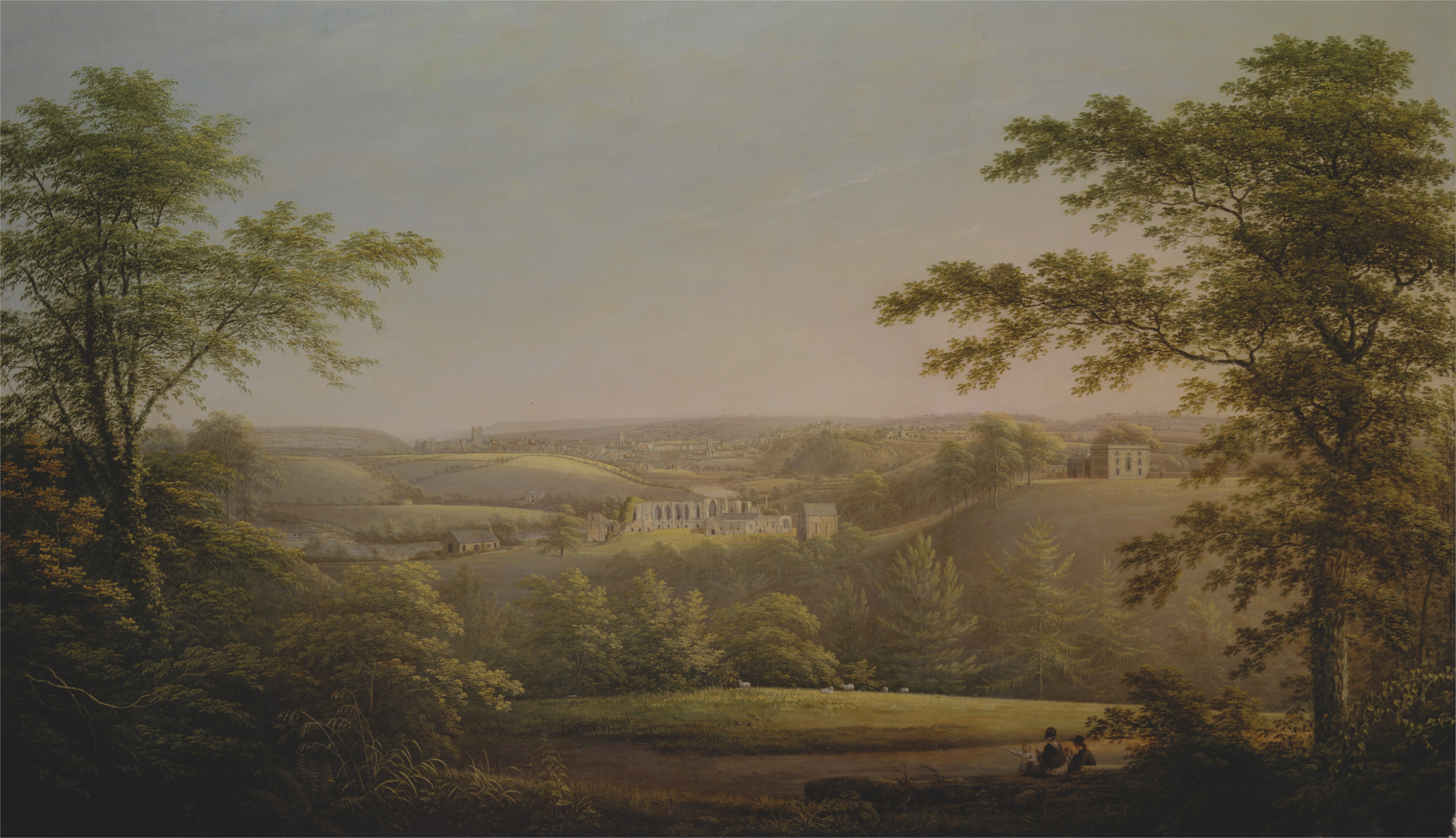
The Yorkshire countryside around Richmond, with the town in the background. c.1800. Painting by George Cuitt.

The "lass" referred to is Frances I'Anson, whom Leonard McNally married in 1787. Her family owned a property in Richmond, Yorkshire called Hill House, hence she was the "lass of Richmond Hill". (Lass is a Scottish or Northern English dialect word for "girl" or "young woman", derived from Old Norse.) Frances's father disapproved of McNally and the couple had to elope in order to marry. She died in childbirth five years after getting married; she was 29.

McNally's authorship was periodically disputed and other origins for the song were claimed over the years. These claims included that it was written by a Rosa Smith, who may have been a poet from Richmond, Surrey near London, and that it was about herself; that it was the work of another songwriter called Upton; and that the Prince of Wales (who later became the Prince Regent and then George IV) was the author. It was also thought that the Prince of Wales's mistress, Maria Fitzherbert ("Mrs Fitzherbert") was the subject of the song. All of these claims were unfounded.

The song is a ballad of praise of and expression of love for the "lass". It contains two verses with eight lines each and a chorus of four lines repeated after each verse. The first verse begins with the notable lines:

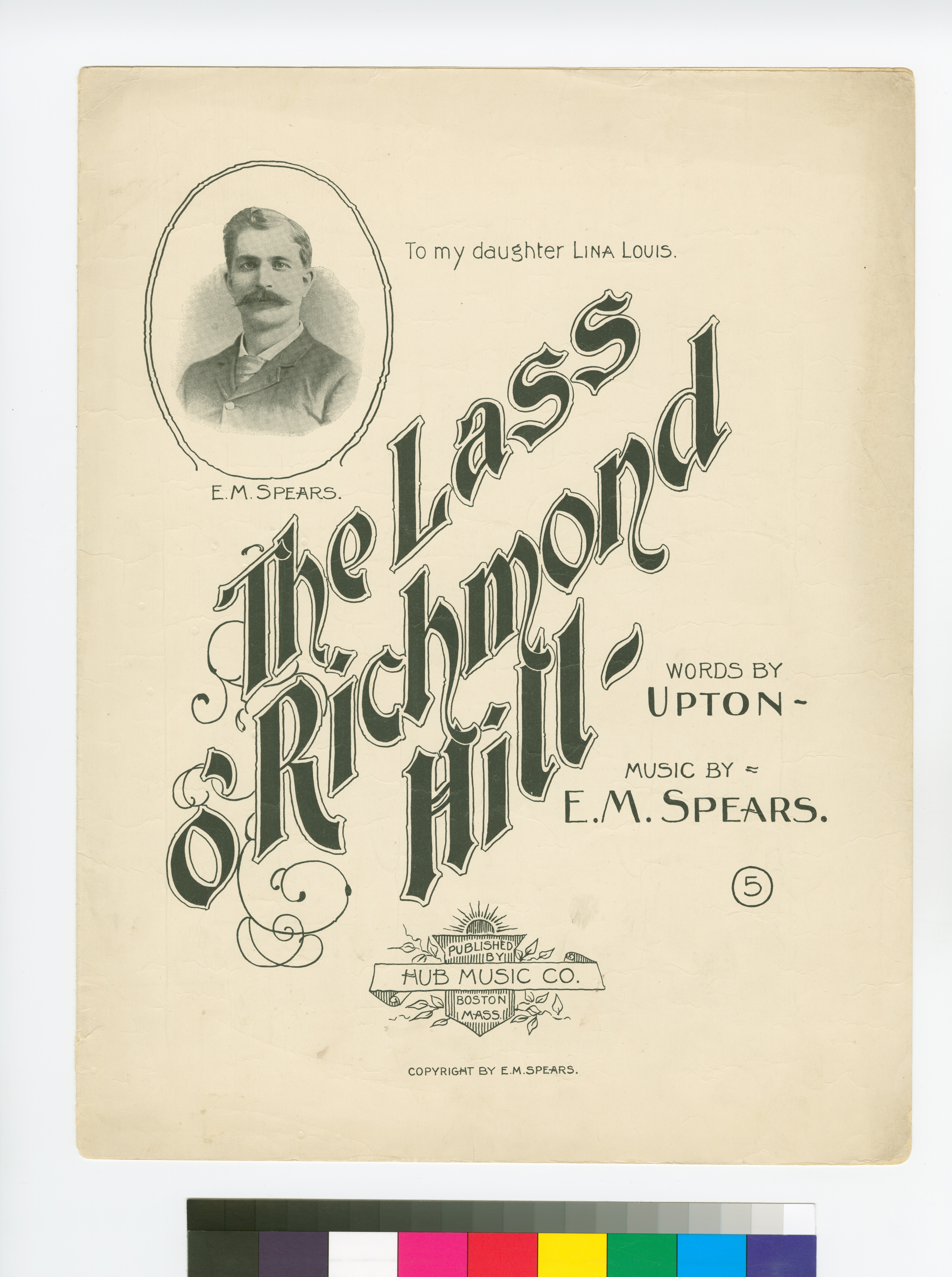
A version of the song published in the United States, 1900, incorrectly attributing it to "Upton".

On Richmond Hill there lives a lass,
More bright than May-day morn,
Whose charms all other maids' surpass,
A rose without a thorn.

The chorus is:

Sweet lass of Richmond Hill,
Sweet lass of Richmond Hill,
I'd crowns resign to call thee mine,
Sweet lass of Richmond Hill.

According to the musicologist and conductor Peter Holman, "a way of celebrating national identity was to place a love-story in a picturesque British rural setting. The most famous song of this type is James Hook's The Lass of Richmond Hill." The song was seen as so quintessentially English that authorship by an Irishman, that is, by McNally, was, as mentioned earlier, periodically challenged.

== Music ==
The music was composed by James Hook (1746–1827), a composer and organist at Vauxhall Gardens from 1774 to 1820. Hook composed over 2,000 songs, the best known of which is "The Lass of Richmond Hill".

The music epitomises Hook's charming but sanitised folk-song style using a Scottish pastoral idiom, and is often mistakenly believed to be a genuine traditional folk song, and has been assigned the number 1246 on the Roud Folk Song Index. Indeed, it has become a Scottish country dance.

== History and cultural references to the song ==
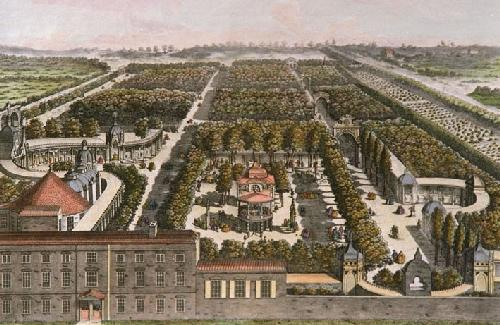
A prospect of Vauxhall Gardens, where the song was first performed publicly in 1789

The song was first performed publicly by Charles Incledon at Vauxhall Gardens in 1789, although McNally appears to have written the words long before that. It became one of the most popular songs of the time, and was said to be a favourite of George III. The song remains popular, and, for example, is played by the BBC's classical music station, Radio 3.

As well as becoming a Scottish country dance, the music has been used as a military march by the British army and is the Regimental march of the Women's Royal Army Corps and the Middlesex Yeomanry. It was also the march of the 107th Regiment of Foot (Bengal Light Infantry), a predecessor of the Royal Sussex Regiment.

The song, or its title, has been the subject of a wide variety of cultural references and allusions:

- The romantic metaphor "a rose without a thorn" was popularized by the song. It was subsequently much used, a recent example being by the singer-songwriter Nick Drake in his song "Time has told me".
- An early work of the Austrian composer Johann Nepomuk Hummel, entitled "The Lass of Richmond Hill" (Opus No. 2), is a variation for the piano and was published in 1791.
- Sweet Lass of Richmond Hill was the title of a 1970 historical novel about Mrs Fitzherbert by Eleanor Hibbert under the pen name "Jean Plaidy".
- The Lass of Richmond Hill was an 1877 painting by George Dunlop Leslie.
- According to a popular story, Richmond Hill, Ontario gained its name from the nostalgic insistence of the town's first school teacher, who was from Richmond in England, that it should be named after the song.
- "Lass of Richmond Hill" is a pub in Richmond in London, the naming of which reflects earlier confusion between which of the two Richmonds the song concerned.
- A 1957 BBC film, directed by Rudolph Cartier, about Mrs Fitzherbert was called The Lass of Richmond Hill.
- In Dickens' David Copperfield, Uriah Heep references the ballad thus: "I call her mine, you see, Master Copperfield. There's a song that says, "I'd crowns resign, to call her mine!" I hope to do it, one of these days."
