= Francis Clater =

British farrier and writer

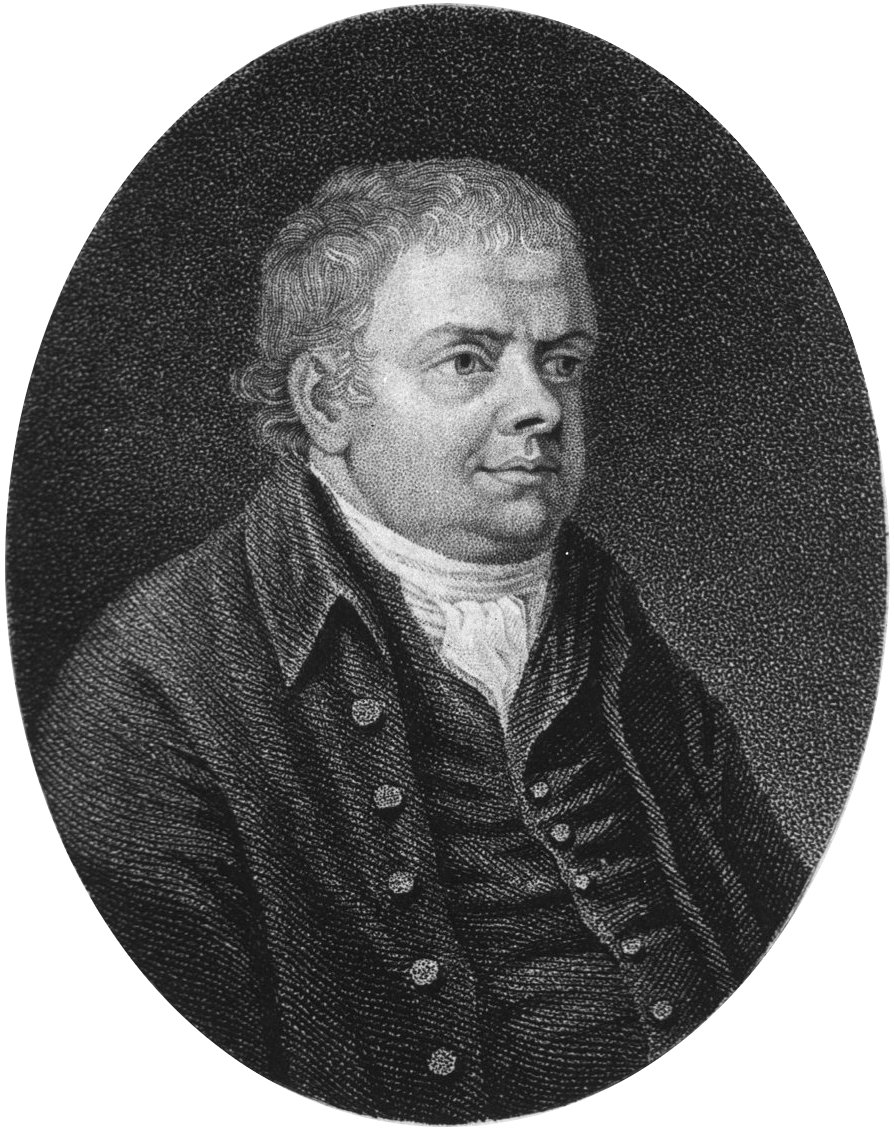

Francis Clater (1756–1823), was a British farrier and writer.

Clater wrote 'Every Man his own Cattle Doctor' (1810) and 'Every Man his own Farrier.' In the preface to the last-named work, which was published at Newark-on-Trent in 1783, when the writer was twenty-six, Clater describes himself as 'farrier, late of Newark,' and states that he served a regular apprenticeship and one year as journeyman to 'the late W. Frost, farrier, of Nottingham, and being his nephew, succeeded to all the secrets of his profession.'

The work was published at the desire of the numerous gentlemen and farmers who were Clater's employers, and appears to have roused the hostility of farriers generally. The writer insists chiefly on careful diagnosis of individual cases, and the use of pure drugs. Clater afterwards resided for many years at East Retford, where he practised as a chemist and druggist, as well as a cattle doctor, and, according to the inscription on a small memorial tablet set up in the methodist chapel in Newgate Street in that town, was much respected, and there died, on 29 May 1823, in the sixty-seventh year of his age.

The publication of his works marked a stage in veterinary progress, and their lasting popularity may be judged from the fact that, at the hands of the writer's son, John Clater, and subsequent editors, the former went through over twelve, and the latter over thirty editions. In the later ones — as the edition of 'Every Man his own Farrier' by Mayhew, published in 1850, and of the 'Cattle Doctor' by Armytage, published in 1870 — much exploded conjecture has been omitted, and the text almost entirely rewritten.
