= James Hook (composer) =

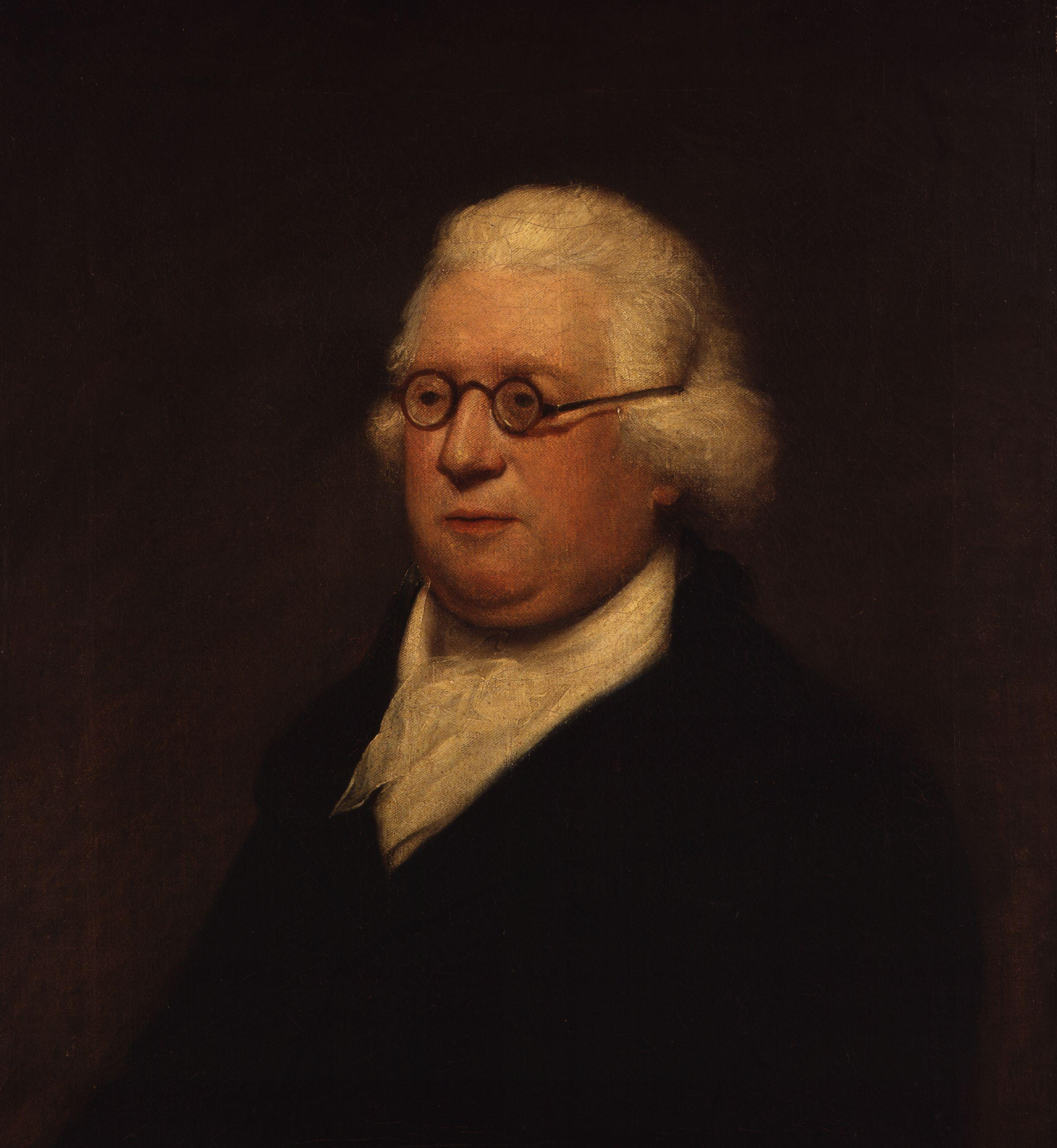

Background information
- Born: 3 June 1746; Norwich, England
- Died: 1827 (aged 80–81) Boulogne
- Occupations: Composer and organist
- Instruments: Organ, harpsichord, fortepiano
- Years active: 1756–1820

James Hook (3 June 1746 – 1827) was an English composer and organist and a friend of Joseph Haydn and Muzio Clementi.

== Life and musical career ==
He was born in Norwich, the son of James Hook, a razor-grinder and cutler. He displayed a remarkable musical talent at an early age, playing the harpsichord by the age of four and performing concertos in public at age six. He began performing regularly by the time he was 10 years old, including benefit concerts. He held many jobs to earn money, including teaching, composing, transcribing music and tuning keyboard instruments.

Sometime between June 1763 and February 1764 Hook moved to London. There he became the organist at White Conduit House, Pentonville, one of the tea gardens that were popular in 18th-century London. He worked as an organist, teacher and composer, and gained a reputation for composing vocal music. He married the artist and writer Elizabeth Jane Madden on 29 May 1766, at St. Pancras Old Church. They had two sons, James (1772–1828) and Theodore Edward (1788–1841).

Hook was appointed organist and composer to Marylebone Gardens in 1768. In addition to his performances as an organist, and occasionally on the harpsichord, he was now invited to perform concertos between the main works in the theatres, and his short musical entertainments and comic operas were being produced for the pleasure gardens and in the London theatres.

He was appointed organist of St Johns Horselydown, Bermondsey, in 1776, and frequently played concerts on newly built organs, both in London and in nearby counties, often playing his own compositions. He was highly successful as a teacher of organ and harpsichord. Hook remained at Marylebone Gardens until the end of the 1773 season, and a year later was engaged in a similar position at Vauxhall Gardens. Hook had a pupil then named Margaret Thornton and 1778 when she was singing Hook's songs in Vauxhall Gardens. She sang his songs there each summer until 1780. Thornton returned to Vauxhall as Margeret Martyr and Hook worked there until 1820.

Throughout these years he composed operas and other musical works, most of which were produced at Drury Lane and Covent Garden Theatres. He frequently collaborated with family members. His wife Elizabeth wrote the libretto for the opera The Double Disguise (1784). His son James provided librettos for Jack of Newbury (1795) and Diamond Cut Diamond (1797), while Thomas Edward composed librettos for at least eight operas.

On 18 October 1805 Hook's first wife, Elizabeth Jane Madden, died. A year later, on 4 November 1806, he married his second wife, Harriet Horncastle James. It was at this time that he produced his best work, Tekeli, or the Siege of Montgatz, the life and adventure of Imre Thököly.

In 1820 he unexpectedly left his position at Vauxhall, after almost a half century of service, and he died seven years later in Boulogne.

== Works ==
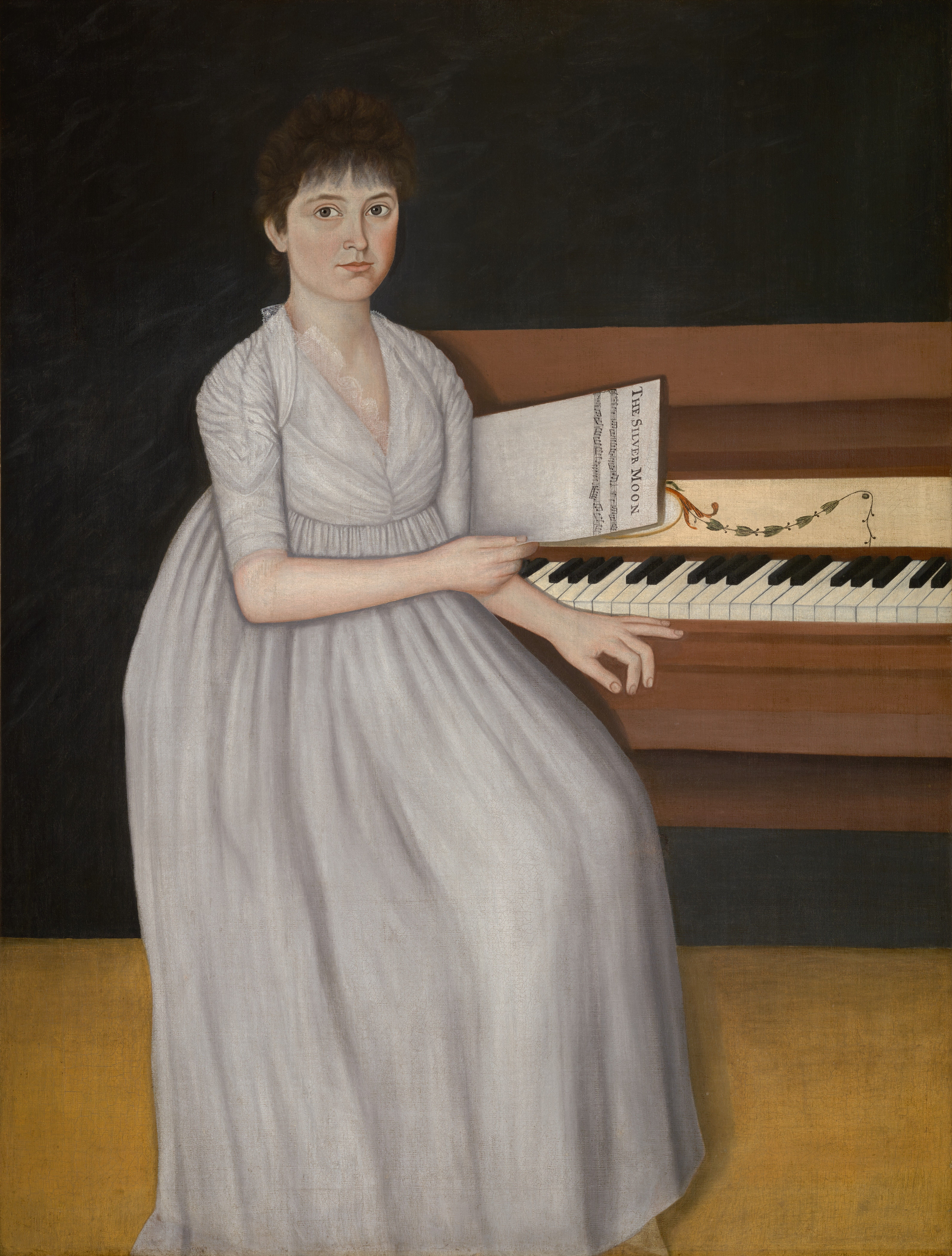
Portrait of Sarah Prince by John Brewster, Jr. (ca. 1801). She is holding a copy of the sheet music for Hook's song "The Silver Moon" (1794).

Stage works

- Trick Upon Trick (pantomime), July 1772, Op. 3
- Cupid's Revenge (pastoral farce), 12 June 1772, Op. 8
- The Lady of the Manor (comic opera), 23 November 1778, Op. 20
- Too Civil by Half (farce), 5 November 1782, Op. 25
- The Double Disguise (farce), 8 March 1784, Op. 32
- The Fair Peruvian (comic opera), 18 March 1786, Op. 45
- The Feast of Anacreon (serenata), 24 May 1788, Op. 53
- Look ere you Leap (serenata), 2 June 1792, Op. 69
- Jack of Newbury (comic opera with masque), 6 May 1795, Op. 80
- Diamond Cut Diamond, or Venetian Revels (comic opera), 23 May 1797, Op. 89
- The Wreath of Loyalty, or British Volunteer (serenata), 31 July 1799, Op. 94
- Wilmore Castle (comic opera), 21 October 1800, Op. 96
- The Soldier's Return or What Can Beauty Do? (comic opera), 23 April 1805, Op. 108
- The Invisible Girl (operatic farce), 28 April 1806, Op. 112
- Catch him who Can (farce), 12 June 1806, Op. 113
- Tekeli, or the Siege of Montgatz (melodrama), 24 November 1806, Op. 114
- The Fortress (melodrama), 16 July 1807, Op. 117
- Music Mad (comic sketch), 27 August 1807, Op. 119
- The Siege of St Quintin, or Spanish Heroism (drama), 10 November 1808, Op. 122
- Killing no Murder (farce), 21 August 1809, Op. 129
- Safe and Sound (comic opera), 28 August 1809, Op. 130
- Sharp and Flat (operatic farce), 4 August 1813, Op. 140

Large vocal works

- The Ascension, oratorio, Covent Garden, 20 March, 1776

Chamber music

- Six Sonatas For Violoncello and Piano, 1783
- Six Solos for Flute and Harpsichord, ca.1774
- Six Sonatas For flute (or violin) and Piano, Op. 54
- Six duets for 2 cellos, Op. 58
- Six Trios for Three Flutes, ca.1795, Op. 83
- Six Trios for Three Flutes, Op. 133

Keyboard sonatas

- Six Familiar Sonatas, 1798

Concerti

- Works for the clarinet, organ, fortepiano, etc.

Songs

- Over 2,000 Songs, most notably The Lass of Richmond Hill
- “The Glorious First of June”

Rhymes

- Christmas Box
- Christmas box, Volume 2 (For Juvenile Amusement. Set to music by Mr. Hook.)

Pedagogical works

- Guida di musica, Being a Complete Book of Instructions for Beginners on the Harpsichord or Piano Forte … to which is added 24 Progressive Lessons (c1785), Op. 37
- Guida di musica, Second Part, Consisting of Several Hundred Examples of Fingering … and *Six Exercises … to which is added, a Short … Method of learning Thoro' bass … (?1794), Op. 75
- The Preceptor for the Piano-Forte, Organ or harpsichord … Favorite Airs … a Collection of Progressive Lessons … [and] Two Celebrated Lessons (?1795)
- New Guida di musica, Being a Compleat Book of Instructions for Beginners on the Harpsichord or Piano Forte … to which is added 24 Progressive Lessons (1796), Op. 81
