= 1786 in literature =

This article contains information about the literary events and publications of 1786.

== Events ==
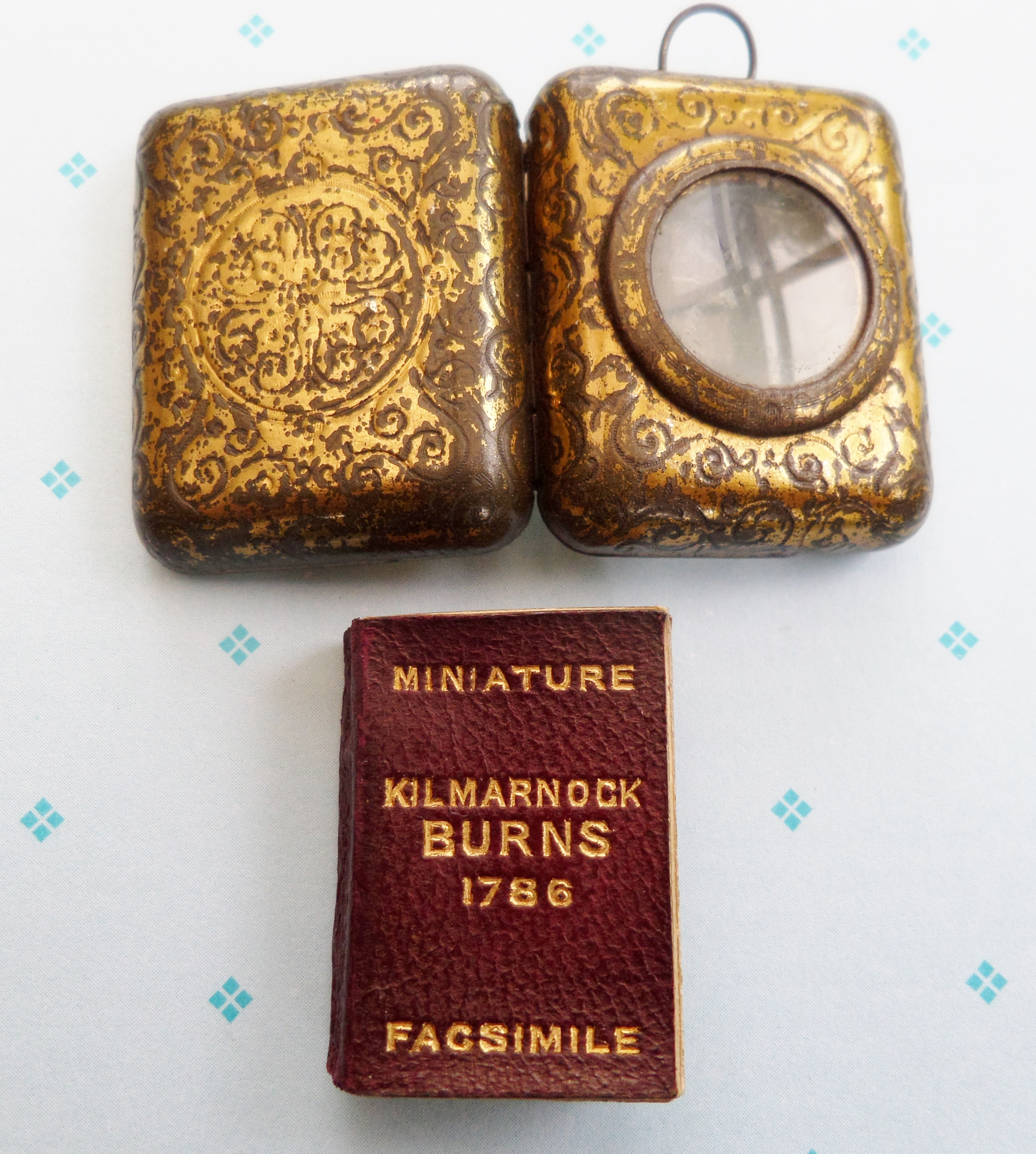
The miniature facsimile edition of Poems, Chiefly in the Scottish Dialect.

- January 19 – Franziska Stading plays the female lead in Gustav Vasa (with libretto personally overseen by King Gustav III of Sweden) at the Royal Swedish Opera.
- July 31 – Scottish poet Robert Burns' Poems, Chiefly in the Scottish Dialect is published by John Wilson in Kilmarnock in 612 copies (the text having been submitted to him on July 13). The volume proves so popular that Burns abandons his plans to emigrate to Jamaica on September 1 for a post as a bookkeeper on a slave plantation and on November 27–28 journeys on a borrowed pony from Mossgiel Farm for his first visit to Edinburgh. Two weeks later he extemporises his "Address to a Haggis", which is first published on December 20 in the Caledonian Mercury.
- October 5 – Death of French official Jean-Baptiste Marie de Piquet, Marquess of Méjanes; his book collection is bequeathed to form the basis of the Bibliothèque Méjanes at Aix-en-Provence.
- September 3–December – Johann Wolfgang von Goethe undertakes his Italian Journey (published 1817).
- November – The Boydell Shakespeare Gallery is inaugurated in London.

== New books ==
=== Fiction ===
- William Thomas Beckford – Vathek
- James Boswell – Dorado, a Spanish Tale (published anonymously)
- Harriet Lee – The Errors of Innocence
- Isabelle de Montolieu (as "le traducteur de Werther") – Caroline de Lichtfield, ou Mémoires extraits des papiers d'une famille prussienne
- Johann Karl August Musäus – Volksmärchen der Deutschen (fourth volume)
- André-Robert Andréa de Nerciat – Le Diable au Corps
- Friedrich Schiller – The Ghost-Seer (Der Geisterseher, publication commences)

=== Children ===
- Mrs. Trimmer
  - Fabulous Histories
  - A Description of a Set of Prints of Scripture History
- Rudolf Erich Raspe (published anonymously)
  - Singular Travels, Campaigns, Voyages, and Sporting Adventures of Baron Munnikhouson, commonly pronounced Munchausen (2nd ed.)
  - Translated into German from English by Gottfried August Bürger – The Surprising Adventures of Baron Munchhausen

=== Drama ===
- Tituš Brezovački – Sveti Aleksij
- John Burgoyne – The Heiress and Richard Coeur de Lion
- George Colman the Elder – Tit for Tat
- Hannah Cowley – A School for Greybeards
- John Delap – The Captives
- Germaine de Staël – Sophie
- Johann Wolfgang von Goethe – Iphigenia in Tauris (verse version)
- Elizabeth Inchbald – The Widow's Vow
- James Johnstone – The Disbanded Officer
- John O'Keeffe
  - Love in a Camp
  - The Siege of Curzola
- Frederick Pilon – He Would Be a Soldier
- Frederic Reynolds – Eloisa

=== Poetry ===
- Robert Burns – Poems, Chiefly in the Scottish Dialect
- Helen Maria Williams – Poems (on religious and political subjects)

=== Non-fiction ===
- Thomas Clarkson – An Essay of the Slavery and Commerce of the Human Species, Particularly the African (translation of a 1784 Latin essay competition entry)
- John Gilchrist – A Dictionary English and Hindoostanee. To which Is Prefixed a Grammar of the Hindoostanee Language (begins publication)
- William Herschel – Catalogue of One Thousand New Nebulae and Clusters of Stars
- Immanuel Kant – Metaphysische Anfangsgründe der Naturwissenschaft
- Richard Payne Knight – An Account of the Remains of the Worship of Priapus... (later A Discourse on the Worship of Priapus...)
- Friedrich Schiller – Der Verbrecher aus verlorener Ehre
- Emanuel Swedenborg – Divine Love and Wisdom (translated from Latin into French by Antoine-Joseph Pernety)
- Hester Thrale – Anecdotes of the Late Samuel Johnson
- John Horne Tooke – 'Epea Pteroenta' – The Diversions of Purley (Winged Words, part 2 in 1805)

== Births ==
- February 3 – Wilhelm Gesenius, German philologist and theologian (died 1842)
- February 11 – James Cowles Prichard, English ethnologist and psychiatrist
- February 24 – Wilhelm Grimm, German philologist and folklorist (died 1859)
- May 10 – Esther Copley, English children's writer and tractarian (died 1851)
- May 12 – Jean-François Barrière, French historian (died 1868)
- June 20 – Marceline Desbordes-Valmore, French poet (died 1859)
- June 26 – Sunthorn Phu, Thai poet (died 1855)
- August 25 – James Silk Buckingham, English journalist and travel writer (died 1855)
- October 23 – Barron Field, English-born Australian poet (died 1846)
- December 6 – Caroline Anne Southey (Caroline Anne Bowles), English poet (died 1854)
- unknown date
  - Helena Charlotta Åkerhielm, Swedish dramatist and translator (died 1828)
  - Eaton Stannard Barrett, Irish satirical poet and novelist (died 1820)
  - Caroline Cornwallis, English feminist writer (d. 1858)

== Deaths ==
- January 4 – Moses Mendelssohn, German philosopher of the Haskalah or Jewish enlightenment (born 1729).
- January 19 – John Duncombe, English writer and cleric (born 1729)
- March 11 – Jacobus Bellamy, Dutch poet (born 1757)
- April 13 – Jan Tomáš Kuzník, Czech musician and poet (born 1716)
- May 4 – Johann Kaspar Füssli, artist, writer and publisher (born 1743)
- August 15 – Thomas Tyrwhitt, English classicist and critic (born 1730)
- November 30 – Thomas Thistlewood, English-born Jamaican diarist (born 1721)
- December 26 – Gasparo Gozzi, Italian dramatist and critic (born 1713)
