= Margaret Kennedy (singer) =

British singer and actress

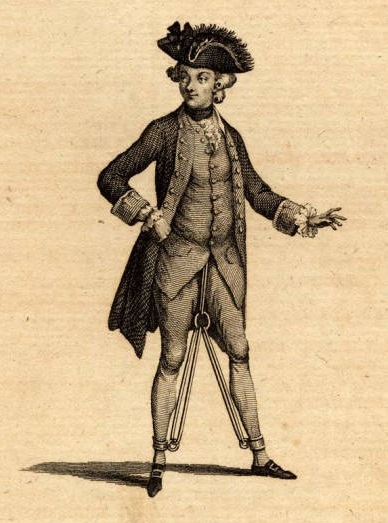
- Kennedy as Captain Macheath in the 1777 London production of The Beggar's Opera
- Born: Margaret Doyle
- Died: 23 January 1793; Bayswater, London
- Other names: Margaret Farrell
- Occupations: Contralto singer; Actress
- Years active: 1776–1790

Margaret Kennedy (née Doyle; died 23 January 1793) was a contralto singer and actress. She was best known for her performances in male roles, especially in the operas of Thomas Arne.

== Early career (1776–1779) ==
Kennedy was born with the name Margaret Doyle, but the place and date of her birth are not known. She had Irish ancestry, and she may have been born in Ireland or possibly in London.

Kennedy married a Mr. Farrell in August 1774, before she made her singing debut, and she appeared under the name "Mrs Farrell" in her early career. She may have studied music with Gaetano Quilici. She was discovered by Thomas Arne while performing as a singer at an inn in St Giles, London. She studied under Arne and sang at the Haymarket Theatre in three concerts organised by Arne for his pupils in 1775, appearing in another pupils' concert in early 1776. She appeared in Arne's Comus at Covent Garden in March 1776.

She was a principal singer at the Royal Opera House from 6 December 1776 in Arne's opera Caractacus. Her performances were praised by The Morning Post, particularly a duet with Leoni. Her contralto pitch and relatively heavy build suited her for breeches roles, and she played the title role in Arne's Artaxerxes on 25 January 1777, Belford in Thomas Hull's Love Finds the Way, Colin in Charles Dibdin's Rose and Colin, and most notably Captain Macheath in John Gay's The Beggar's Opera where in 1777 she was the first person to sing "A-Hunting We Will Go", a song written by Arne for that performance. Her debut performance in The Beggar's Opera was greeted by protests because a woman was playing the role of a lead character.

She sang at Ranelagh Gardens in 1777 and 1778, in the theatre, and at festivals in Manchester, Oxford, and Winchester.

== Mid-career (1779–1789) ==
After the death of her first husband, she married the Irish physician Morgan Hugh Kennedy on 24 January 1779. She subsequently appeared as "Mrs Kennedy".

After 1779, Kennedy performed as Young Meadows in Love in a Village and Don Carlos in Richard Brinsley Sheridan's The Duenna. She completed her career at Covent Garden. While there, she performed in many roles, including Don Alfonso in Thomas Arnold's The Castle of Andalusia, Patrick in John O'Keeffe's The Poor Soldier and Mrs Casey in his Fontainebleau, Margaret and then Allen-a-Dale in William Shield's Robin Hood, as well as parts in Shield's Rosina and Omai, and also in Henry Fielding's Tom Thumb, William Kenrick's Lady of the Manor, and Dibdin's The Islanders. Kennedy also sang at concerts in Vauxhall Gardens from 1781 to 1785, in the Drury Lane oratorios (1778–84), and in the Handel commemorations of 1784, 1786, and 1791.

She retired from public performance in 1789, appearing for the last time on the theatre stage in the role of William in Shield's Rosina on 2 April 1789.

== Later life (1790s–death) ==
Kennedy's health declined and she died in Bayswater in January 1793, where her husband was practising at a lying-in hospital. She was buried at St Anne's Church, Soho, on 3 February 1793.
