= She Stoops to Conquer (1910 film) =

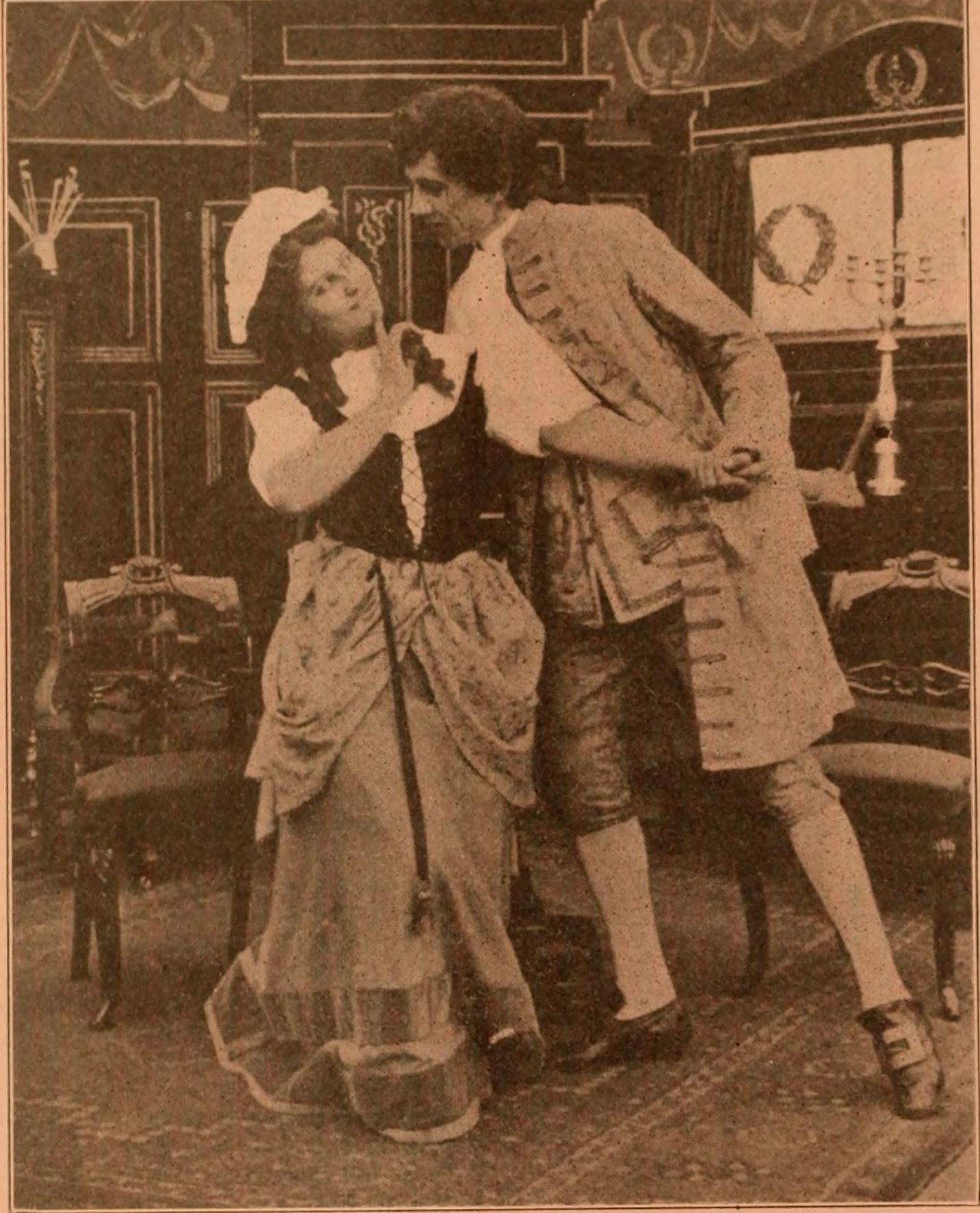
- A surviving film still
- Produced by: Thanhouser Company
- Release date: August 19, 1910
- Country: United States
- Languages: Silent film English intertitles

She Stoops to Conquer is a 1910 American silent short drama produced by the Thanhouser Company. The film is an adaptation of Oliver Goldsmith's She Stoops to Conquer, possibly adapted by Lloyd Lonergan. The scenario removes a subplot in favor of following Marlow who is sent by his father to court the daughter of an old friend of his. He encounters Tony Lumpkin, who directs him to the Hardcastle mansion, tricking him into believing that Hardcastle's house is an inn. Hardcastle welcomes Marlow, but Marlow treats his host rudely, unaware of Hardcastle's identity. When the misunderstanding is rectified Marlow refuses to marry Hardcastle's daughter, for he has taken a liking to the maid servant. Caught in the act of having sex with the maid by his father, the woman is revealed to be Hardcastle's daughter and all ends well. The film was released on August 19, 1910, but it received mixed reviews by critics. The film is presumed lost.

== Plot ==
Though the film is presumed lost, a synopsis survives in The Moving Picture World from August 20, 1910. It states: "The play deals with the love affair of two young people, both of whose parents are anxious that they should wed. Young Marlow [is] sent by his father to court the daughter of an old friend, Mr. Hardcastle. Marlow has spent very little time in the company of the fairer sex, and as a consequence thereof is always shy and nervous in their presence. He, therefore, accepts his father's orders unwillingly and, accompanied by his friend, young Hastings, rides out to meet his future bride. On the road the travelers encounter Hardcastle's stepson, Tony Lumpkin, who in revenge for punishment his stepfather has inflicted, directs Marlow and his friend to the Hardcastle mansion, claiming that it is an inn where they will be well treated. In the meantime, great preparations are being made at the Hardcastle home for the reception of Hardcastle's old friend, and when Tony ushers in young Marlow, thinking Hardcastle merely the proprietor of an inn, he treats him with scant courtesy and orders him about, much to the older man's chagrin. Hardcastle is subjected to his daughter's extravagant costumes, and she appears on this memorable evening dressed in a simple dress and wearing the cap and apron that housewives in the neighborhood assume. This costume greatly pleases her father, but leads young Marlow further astray. He immediately jumps to the conclusion that she is a most attractive barmaid and loses his heart to her in short order. Upon the arrival of his father, Marlow learns his mistake as regards the inn question, but flatly refuses to marry Hardcastle's daughter, claiming that she is too grand for him, and citing his preference for the maid servant. While in the act of making love to the supposed barmaid he is discovered by his father, and, when told that this is the young lady his father had intended him to marry, he is overjoyed, as he feels sure that his bashful disposition would never have allowed him to woo and win her had he known her to be a lady of fashion."

== Cast ==
- Anna Rosemond in an unknown role.
- Frank H. Crane in an unknown role.

According to Hervé Dumont's Encyclopédie du film historique the role of Kate Hardcastle was played by Rosemond and the role of George Marlow was played by Crane. This information may have come from a surviving film still. One surviving film still was used in an advertisement by the Thanhouser Company.

== Production ==
The scenario is an adaptation of Oliver Goldsmith's She Stoops to Conquer and was not, by that time, not familiar to most theatergoers. The writer of the scenario is unknown, but it was most likely Lloyd Lonergan. He was an experienced newspaperman employed by The New York Evening World while writing scripts for the Thanhouser productions. The impetus to adapt the play for the film may have been inspired by a recent Broadway production as noted in one Thanhouser advertisement, "So revered is She Stoops to Conquer in the hearts of the American public that recently they saw it as an all-star Broadway production with Eleanor Robson as Kate and Kyrle Bellew as Marlow, and it scored an epoch-making success. The present producers don't claim it to be a Broadway production but they [do] know it's the best picture thing of its kind that has been released this far in the game." The advertisement also claims to be the first film adaptation of the play, which according to The Complete Index to Literary Sources in Film it is. She Stoops to Conquer would see numerous adaptations over the following decades, but the Thanhouser Company would also draw from Goldsmith's work with their first adaptation of The Vicar of Wakefield in 1910.

The film director is unknown, but it may have been Barry O'Neil. Film historian Q. David Bowers does not attribute a cameraman for this production, but at least two possible candidates exist. Blair Smith was the first cameraman of the Thanhouser company, but he was soon joined by Carl Louis Gregory who had years of experience as a still and motion picture photographer. The role of the cameraman was uncredited in 1910 productions. Though the roles of the actors are unknown, leading actress Anna Rosemond is credited with a role. One of the more prominent leading male actors was Frank H. Crane in another unknown role. It is likely that numerous other character roles and persons appeared in the film. Bowers states that most of the credits are fragmentary for 1910 Thanhouser productions. One of these uncredited roles could have been played by the other leading lady of the company, Violet Heming.

== Release and reception ==
The one reel comedy-drama, approximately 1000 feet long, was released on August 19, 1910. The film had a wide national release with known advertisements in Missouri, Texas, Minnesota, Washington D.C., and Kansas. The film was also shown by the Province Theatre of Vancouver, British Columbia, Canada.

The film received mixed reviews in trade publications. The Moving Picture World remarked that the play itself was not well-known, but that the plot was depicted adequately enough that it may encourage a re-perusal of the play. There was no fault found by the reviewer who stated, "The characters of Hardcastle, Kate and Marlow are admirably done and seem to correctly interpret the original. The staging and costuming are in harmony with the play and reproduce the scenery of the time depicted with accuracy. The usefulness of a work of this sort does not end with the presentation of the play itself. There is an educational value which includes the costuming and reproduction of the surroundings of the time. These are so unfamiliar now that they afford not a little addition to the interest and pleasure of such a film. The work has been done so well that the company deserves commendation for undertaking the task. It is not an easy manner to reproduce a play of this character, and when it is well done the company performing it deserves praise." The New York Dramatic Mirror disagreed on almost all points, "In numerous details the illusion is dispelled, for the scenery is manifestly not of the eighteenth century. No contemporary of Goldsmith ever rode in such a barouche as appears in this film, nor lived in such a house as Mr. Hardcastle. The final tableau is as artificial as set pieces which have gone out of style at funerals. With all of its imperfections there is considerable of virile comedy in the film." Though the Mirror reviewer stated that despite the elimination of the Hastings and Constance Neville subplot, the acting is clear enough that audiences do not need prior knowledge of the play to appreciate the film.

== See also ==
- List of American films of 1910
