= Adelaide O'Keeffe =

Irish amanuensis, poet and novelist (1776–1865)

- Born: 5 November 1776; Dublin
- Died: 4 September 1865 (aged 88); Brighton
- Occupations: amanuensis, poet and novelist
- Known for: poetry
- Parent: John O'Keeffe Mary Heaphy

Adelaide O'Keeffe (5 November 1776 – 4 September 1865) was an author and children's poet, and an amanuensis for her father, noted novelist and poet, John O’Keeffe. She was known for her children's poetry and published verse novel for children.

== Life ==
O'Keeffe was born in Dublin in 1776. Her father was the Irish Catholic playwright John O'Keeffe and her mother was the Protestant actress Mary Heaphy. Adelaide and her brother came under her father's care after her parents' marriage ended. As Donelle Ruwe writes in her study of O'Keeffe's life and works: "When Adelaide was six, her father lost his eyesight and discovered that his wife was having an affair with a Scottish actor named George Graham. Enraged, John O'Keeffe left Ireland forever, taking his children with him." Mary Heaphy later married Graham, for she felt that, as a Protestant, her first union with a Catholic was "not sufficiently binding to prevent a subsequent marriage." When Mary secretly visited the children, O'Keeffe was, in Adelaide's own words, "inflamed with jealousy" and sent both children to France. Seven year-old Adelaide went to a French convent, and there she stayed until the outbreak of the French revolution five years later. Twelve-year-old Adelaide returned to England, and she never again was far from her father. She served as his amanuensis, and she supported him through her earnings as a governess and an author for almost forty-five years until his death in 1833. As her father's amanuensis, Adelaide O'Keeffe would have recorded his work The Farmer in 1787; Wild Oats in 1791 and in 1795 The Wicklow Mountains.

O'Keeffe's first published work is the historical novel Llewellin: A Tale, and throughout her writing career, she would return to the historical fiction form, often seeking out narratives in which her heroes suffered the trauma of a disrupted childhood, often caused by the separation of the hero's parents, as is the case with her final novel The Broken Sword, or, A Soldier’s Honour: A Tale of the Allied Armies of 1757. O'Keeffe's second novel, Zenobia, Queen of Palmyra; a Narrative, Founded on History, is particularly interesting to scholars today, for it features a powerful queen from the Roman empire. Zenobia, as depicted by O'Keeffe, is taught multiple religions (and also teaches others, including her husband) as she converts from paganism, to Judaism, and finally to Christianity. As Donelle Ruwe suggests, although Zenobia's final conversion to Christianity is intended to prove that Christianity is the superior religion, the fact the same pedagogical lessons and approaches are used to sway her from one religion to another ultimately calls into question the very nature of religious belief. O'Keeffe's third novel, Dudley (1819), is set in contemporary times, and it, too, emphasizes discussions of education. It is modeled directly after Adèle et Théodore, ou Lettres sur l'éducation (1782) by Stéphanie Félicité, comtesse de Genlis (translated as Adelaide and Theodore). O'Keeffe's most famous prose work is a retelling of the first five books of the Bible, Patriarchal Times; or, The Land of Canaan: a Figurate History (1811).

Although O'Keeffe was a successful novelist, her greatest claim to literary fame was for her children's poetry. She was one of the three main contributors to the important two-volume collection, Original Poems for Infant Minds (1804, 1805) along with Ann Taylor and Jane Taylor. She followed this publication with Original Poems: Calculated to Improve the Mind of Youth and Allure it to Virtue (1808), The Old Grand-Papa, and Other Poems, for the Amusement of Youth (1812), National Characters Exhibited in Forty Geographical Poems (1818), A Trip to the Coast. Or Poems Descriptive of Various Interesting Objects on the Sea-Shore (1819), Mamma’s Present of Pictures and Poetry (1820), and Poems for Young Children (1848). Her poem "Prejudice" was included in the collection The Hermit and the Traveller (1816) along with poetry by Thomas Parnell and Oliver Goldsmith. In British Children's Poetry of the Romantic Era: Verse, Riddle, and Rhyme (2014), Donelle Ruwe discusses O'Keeffe's many contributions to children's poetry traditions, such as her creation of the children's verse-novel and her use of active learning techniques and innovative verse forms.

O'Keeffe died unmarried in 1865 in Brighton. For the last few years she had been sustained by grants from the Literary Fund.

== Legacy ==
O'Keeffe's poetry has been republished in facsimile form in the database, Irish Women Poets of the Romantic Period, with an introduction by Donelle Ruwe and under the guidance of series editor Stephen Behrendt (Alexander Street Press, 2008).

== Works ==
- Llewellin (1799)
- Patriarchal Times, or, The Land of Canaan (1811)
- Original Poems for Infant Minds by Ann Taylor, Jane Taylor and Adelaide O'Keeffe(1804, 1805)
- Original Poems Calculated to Improve the Mind of Youth (1808)
- The Old Grand-Papa, and Other Poems, for the Amusement of Youth (1812)
- Zenobia, Queen of Palmyra (1814)
- "Prejudice" in The Hermit and the Traveller (1816)
- National Characters Exhibited in Forty Geographical Poems (1818)
- Dudley (1819)
- A Trip to the Coast. Or Poems Descriptive of Various Interesting Objects on the Sea-Shore (1819)
- Mamma’s Present of Pictures and Poetry(1820)
- "Memoir" in O'Keeffe's Legacy to his Daughter (1834)
- Poems for Young Children (1848)
- The Broken Sword: a Tale (1854)
