= The Agreeable Surprise =

1781 comic opera

- Original language: English
- Written by: John O'Keeffe
- Genre: Comedy

Premiere
- Date: 3 September 1781
- Place: Haymarket Theatre

The Agreeable Surprise is a 1781 comic opera in two acts, with music composed by Samuel Arnold and the libretto by John O'Keeffe. It was first performed at the Theatre Royal, Haymarket (London), on 3 September 1781.

It was one of the most performed comic operas in London in the last quarter of the 18th century.

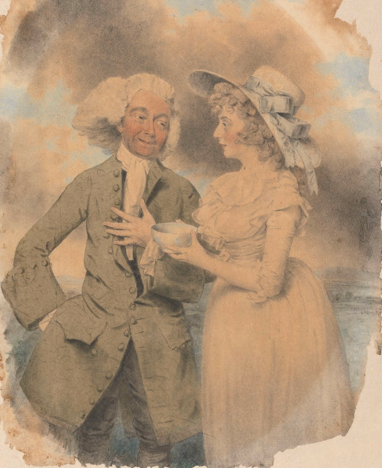
Lingo and Cowslip, painting by John Downman (1787)

== Plot ==
Wealthy Sir Felix Friendly has a son, Eugene. His poor friend Compton has a daughter, Laura. The two fathers have contrived with each other to switch their children, so that Eugene has been raised without wealth by Compton, and Laura has been raised with wealth as Sir Felix’s adopted orphan. The two children are not aware of the truth of their parentage. Compton is a privateer, and is also financially supported by wealthy Sir Felix.

Sir Felix thinks that this arrangement has benefitted Eugene and Laura: Eugene has learned modesty by growing up while imagining himself worthless, and he has avoided the foppery and dissipation that can come from the knowledge he is heir to a fortune. Laura has learned modesty, has cultivated good sense, and knows how to handle money and a life of wealth.

Eugene has made a romantic conquest of a stout and wealthy cheesemonger’s widow, who wants to marry him. But now Eugene and Laura have fallen in love with each other, though they understand that Eugene is poor. Sir Felix and his friend, Compton, secretly plan to reveal the truth and have Eugene and Laura marry each other. Sir Felix wants to keep Laura and Eugene in the dark about everything so that their surprise and joy will be greater.

Lingo is Sir Felix's new crazy butler that also teaches the Latin language — though his Latin is in truth atrocious and more a collection of Latin-sounding gibberish and malapropisms. The comic song Lingo sings of his love for the milkmaid, Cowsllip, is the most quoted part of the text―it is often printed as a poem and given the title "Amo Amas". It demonstrates Lingo's facility with Latin:

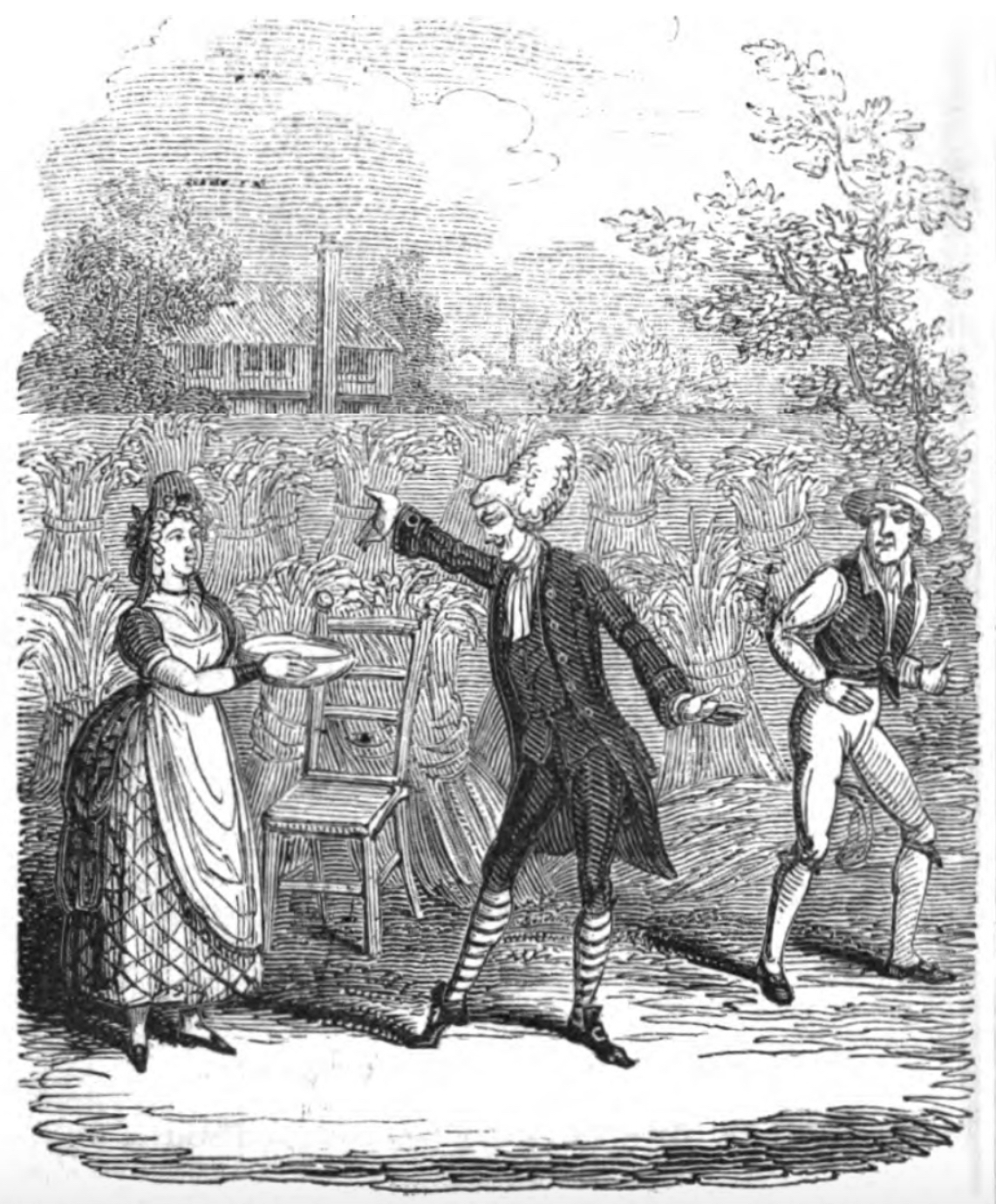
Lingo: "My sweet Cowslip, properly called Cowslip!"

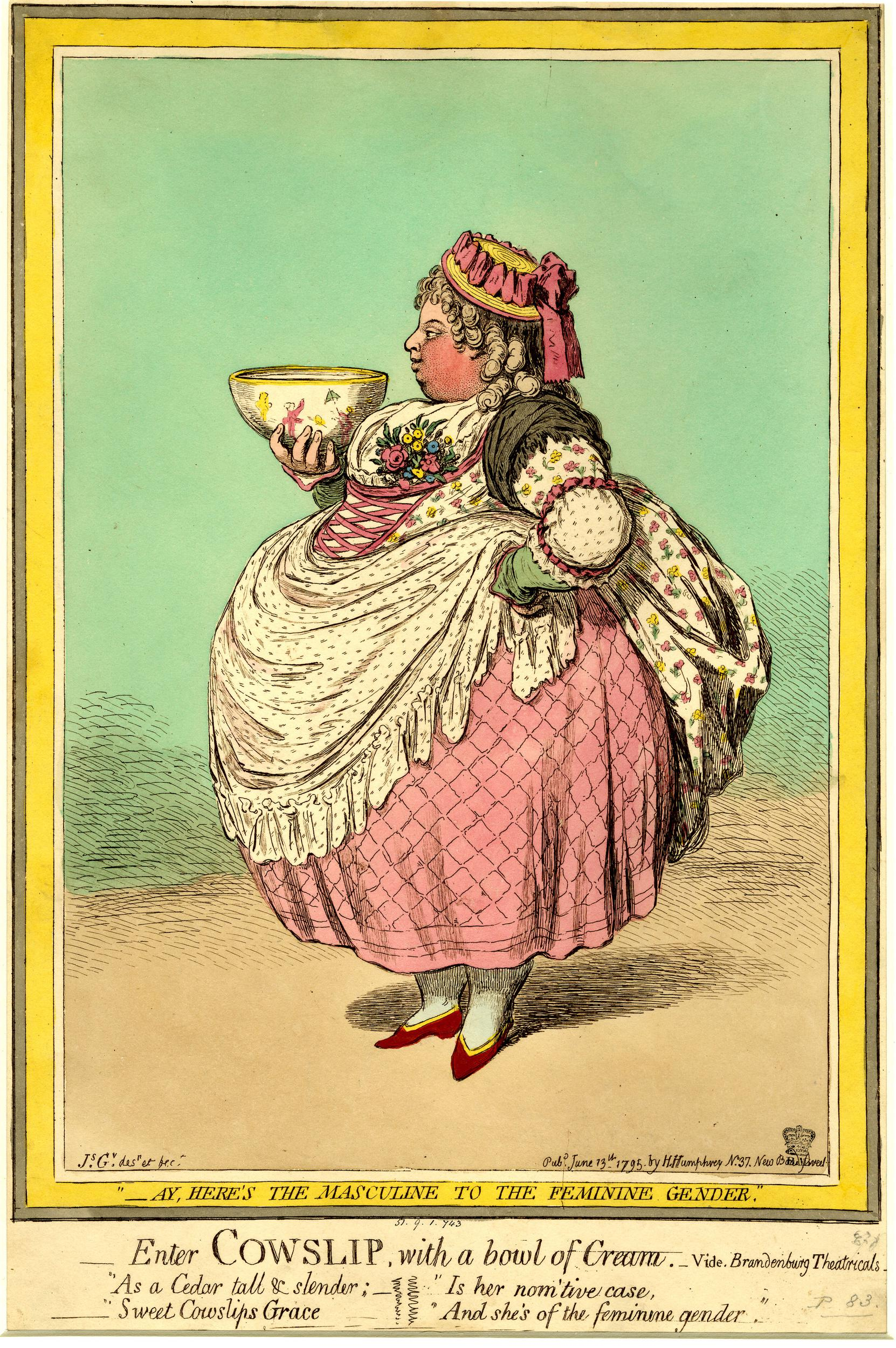
Enter Cowslip with a bowl of cream.

Amo, Amas, I love a lass
As a cedar tall and slender;
Sweet cowslip's grace is her nominative case,
And she's of the feminine gender.

Rorum, Corum, sunt divorum,
Harum, Scarum divo;
Tag-rag, merry-derry, periwig and hat-band
Hic hoc horum genitivo.

Can I decline a Nymph divine?
Her voice as a flute is dulcis.
Her oculus bright, her manus white,
And soft, when I tacto, her pulse is.

Rorum, Corum, sunt divorum,
Harum, Scarum divo;
Tag-rag, merry-derry, periwig and hat-band
Hic hoc horum genitivo.

Oh, how bella my puella,
I'll kiss secula seculorum.
If I've luck, sir, she's my uxor,
O dies benedictorum.

Rorum, Corum, sunt divorum,
Harum, Scarum divo;
Tag-rag, merry-derry, periwig and hat-band
Hic hoc horum genitivo.

Eugene is dutifully respectful of Laura to such an extent that it bothers her, and she has to tell him not to call her "madam". They both wish they were born happy and humble villagers.

Sir Felix announces to Laura that tonight he plans to marry her to his son. Eugene responds: "Son! Have you a son, sir?" Sir Felix says, "You’ll like him." This appears to be a disaster for the two lovers. Laura and Eugene both think that Laura is about to be married off to Sir Felix’s son — and neither realizes that Eugene is in fact that son. In a pair of asides, Laura says, "Till now I never felt the loss of a parent," and Eugene says, "Never till now did I regret the want of a fortune." Eugene, not able to bear the prospect of seeing Laura with another man, plans to travel far away.

In Act Two, Mrs. Cheshire, the widow of the cheesemonger, plans with her lawyer to prevent the wedding, by threatening to force Eugene to marry her instead, or else she will send him to prison if he can’t repay the money she has given him. Sir Felix Looks forward to observing how his son, Eugene, will handle this challenge: Love versus the law.

Meanwhile, Laura intends to run away with Eugene. But at the last moment Eugene persuades Laura that she should not disobey and dishonor Sir Felix's wishes by running away. So they return, and Laura can only hope that Sir Felix's "son" will not insist on marrying her when he learns she loves Eugene. In response, Sir Felix reveals that Eugene is indeed his only son. And Compton reveals to Laura that she is not an orphan, but his daughter. And the wedding will go forward. To make everyone happy, Sir Felix also arranges for the widow of the cheesemonger and her lawyer to marry each other.

== Bibliography ==
- Burling, William J.: Summer Theatre in London, 1661-1820, and the Rise of Haymarket Theatre (London: Associated University Presses, 2000)
- White, Eric Walter: A Register of First Performances of English Operas (London: Society for Theatre Research, 1983)
