= Wild Oats (play) =

1791 play

- Original language: English
- Written by: John O'Keeffe
- Genre: Comedy
- Setting: Hampshire, England, present day

Premiere
- Date: 16 April 1791
- Place: Theatre Royal, Covent Garden, London

Wild Oats is a comedy play by the Irish writer John O'Keeffe which premiered at the Theatre Royal, Covent Garden in 1791. O'Keefe's eyesight deteriorated so the play would have been dictated to his daughter Adelaide O'Keeffe. The original Covent Garden cast included John Quick as Sir George Thunder, William Thomas Lewis as Rover, Joseph George Holman as Harry, Richard Wilson as John Dory, Thomas Hull as Banks, William Cubitt as Gammon, Joseph Shepherd Munden as Ephraim Smooth, William Blanchard as Sim, James Thompson as Sailor, Charles Farley as Sailor, William Macready as Midg, Jane Pope as Lady Amaranth and Mary Wells as Jane. The Irish premiere took place at the Crow Street Theatre in Dublin on 5 December 1791.

== Plot ==
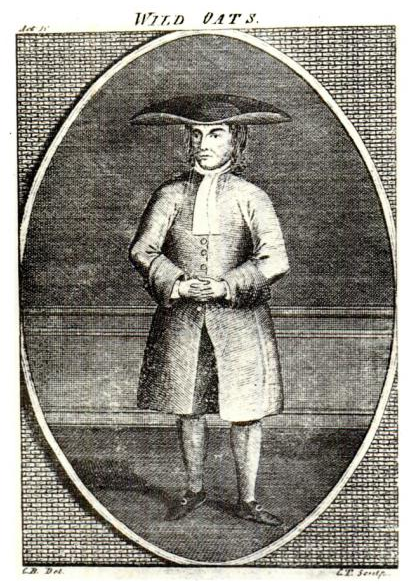
John Henry in role of Ephraim Smooth in American production of Wild Oats

The naval captain Sir George Thunder and his valet and bosun John Dory arrive at an unknown country house on their hunt for deserters. They soon discover that it is the home of Thunder's niece Lady Amaranth, who has been left a legacy on the condition that she live as a Quaker – with another Quaker, Ephraim Smooth, on hand to make sure she sticks to this. Hearing his son Harry has left the naval academy at Portsmouth, he sends John to bring him back to woo Amaranth. Harry has been playing truant with a travelling theatre troupe, where he has made friends with another actor called Jack Rover. However, he decides to leave the troupe and return to the academy.

Rover arrives near Amaranth's house in a storm and seeks shelter with the miserly Farmer Gammon. Gammon refuses and instead he takes shelter with his neighbour Banks and his sister Amelia. Gammon is trying to impoverish Banks to encourage Amelia to marry him and the following morning Rover pays off a debt Banks owes Gammon. Rover then sets off for the London coach, but realising he has no money left, instead takes employment with a new troupe. He then meets Dory, who mistakes him for Harry, then meets Amaranth, with the two falling in love. He and the troupe then end up performing at Amaranth's house, with Amaranth playing Rosalind to Rover's Orlando in As You Like It.

Sir George Thunder hears that 'Harry' (actually Rover) is already wooing Amaranth as hoped. He then meets with the real Harry, who is non-plussed and goes to meet Rover. They keep up the deception, even when Thunder arrives. Thunder then continues his pursuit of the deserters and is saved from them by Rover, who also ends up defending Amelia from Gammon's bailiffs. Amelia then goes to Amaranth to explain how she and Banks became poor – years ago, a young naval officer tried to trick her into a sham marriage. However, her brother Banks was then a naval chaplain and performed the ceremony, making it valid. She had a child but the officer then left her – she ended up travelling to the East Indies and then back to England.

Ephraim is angered at the play being put on, but tries to use it as a cover to woo Amaranth's new handmaid, Gammon's daughter Jane. Overhearing this, Amaranth denounces Ephraim's hypocrisy, renounces her Quakerism and reveals her love for 'Harry'. Rover reveals his true identity and it is revealed that George was the naval officer and Rover their son. However, this invalidates George's second marriage and makes Harry illegitimate, but Rover makes over the Thunder family estate to Harry, asserting that Amaranath and her fortune are enough for him.

== Production history ==
It was revived successfully by the Royal Shakespeare Company in London in autumn 1976, with Alan Howard as Rover and a cast that also included Ben Cross, Joe Melia, Zoë Wanamaker and Jeremy Irons. This production led to many revivals at regional theatres across the UK, the US, and Canada. The Royal National revived it again in 1995 and had Alan Cox as Harry, Anton Lesser as Rover, Benjamin Whitrow as Ephraim, Sarah Woodward as Amaranth and James Bolam as George. In October 2012 it was the first main-house production at Bristol Old Vic after its restoration, re-set in the 1940s and with a cast including Sam Alexander, Kim Wall, Jo Herbert, Hugh Skinner and Isaac Stanmore.

== Bibliography ==
- Greene, John C. Theatre in Dublin, 1745-1820: A Calendar of Performances, Volume 6. Lexington Books, 2011.
