= Tony Lumpkin in Town =

1778 play by John O'Keeffe

- Original language: English
- Written by: John O'Keeffe
- Genre: Comedy
- Setting: London, present day

Premiere
- Date: 2 July 1778
- Place: Theatre Royal, Haymarket, London

Tony Lumpkin in Town is a 1778 Irish comedy play by John O'Keeffe. An afterpiece, it was intended as a sequel to the 1773 play She Stoops to Conquer by Oliver Goldsmith. It is centred on the character Tony Lumpkin. It ran successfully at the Theatre Royal, Haymarket in London. The original cast included William Parsons as Tony Lumpkin, Robert Palmer as Doctor Minum and Charles Bannister as Tim Tickle.

== Bibliography ==
- Hager, Alan. Encyclopedia of British Writers: 16th, 17th & 18th Centuries. Book Builders, 2005.
