= She Stoops to Conquer =

1773 play by Oliver Goldsmith

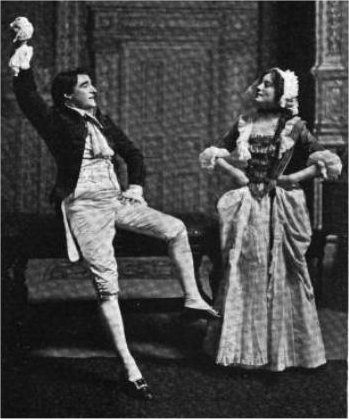
- Kyrle Bellew and Eleanor Robson in a scene from She Stoops to Conquer (1905)
- Original language: English
- Written by: Oliver Goldsmith
- Characters: Charles Marlow; Miss Kate Hardcastle; George Hastings; Tony Lumpkin; Mr. Hardcastle; Mrs. Hardcastle; Miss Constance Neville; Sir Charles Marlow
- Subject: Social commentary
- Genre: Comedy, comedy of manners, satire

Premiere
- Date: 1773
- Place: London, England

She Stoops to Conquer is a comedy play by Anglo-Irish writer Oliver Goldsmith. First performed in London in 1773, it is Goldsmith's best-known play and a cornerstone of both English literature and theatre classes in the English-speaking world. It is one of the few plays from the 18th century that has retained its popularity and is still regularly performed. Regarded as a classic of the period, the work has been adapted for films on numerous occasions, including in 1910, 1914, and 1923. The play is notable as the origin of the common phrase, "Ask me no questions and I'll tell you no lies."

The play was originally titled Mistakes of a Night and its events take place in one long night. The work revolves around Kate Hardcastle, who disguises herself as a barmaid to gain the attention of Charles Marlow, an attractive man who is nervous around upper-class women but confident and bold with those from the class system's lower levels. The plot involves a series of misunderstandings, deceptions and manipulations, primarily orchestrated by Kate, who pretends to be the barmaid to test Marlow's actual character. Ultimately, Marlow realises his mistake and falls in love with Kate's mannerisms, leading to their engagement. The work explores themes of social class, honesty, and the differences between appearances and true character. It is generally categorised in the comedy of manners genre, and satirises the idea of social classes and courtship rituals.

On its release, the play was praised by several critics, including Samuel Johnson and James Boswell, who regarded it as one of Goldsmith's finest literary achievements. The play remains important due to its contribution to the genre of English drama, its exploration of social themes during the Georgian era, and its enduring popularity among audiences. In 1778, Irish dramatist John O'Keeffe wrote a loose sequel, Tony Lumpkin in Town.

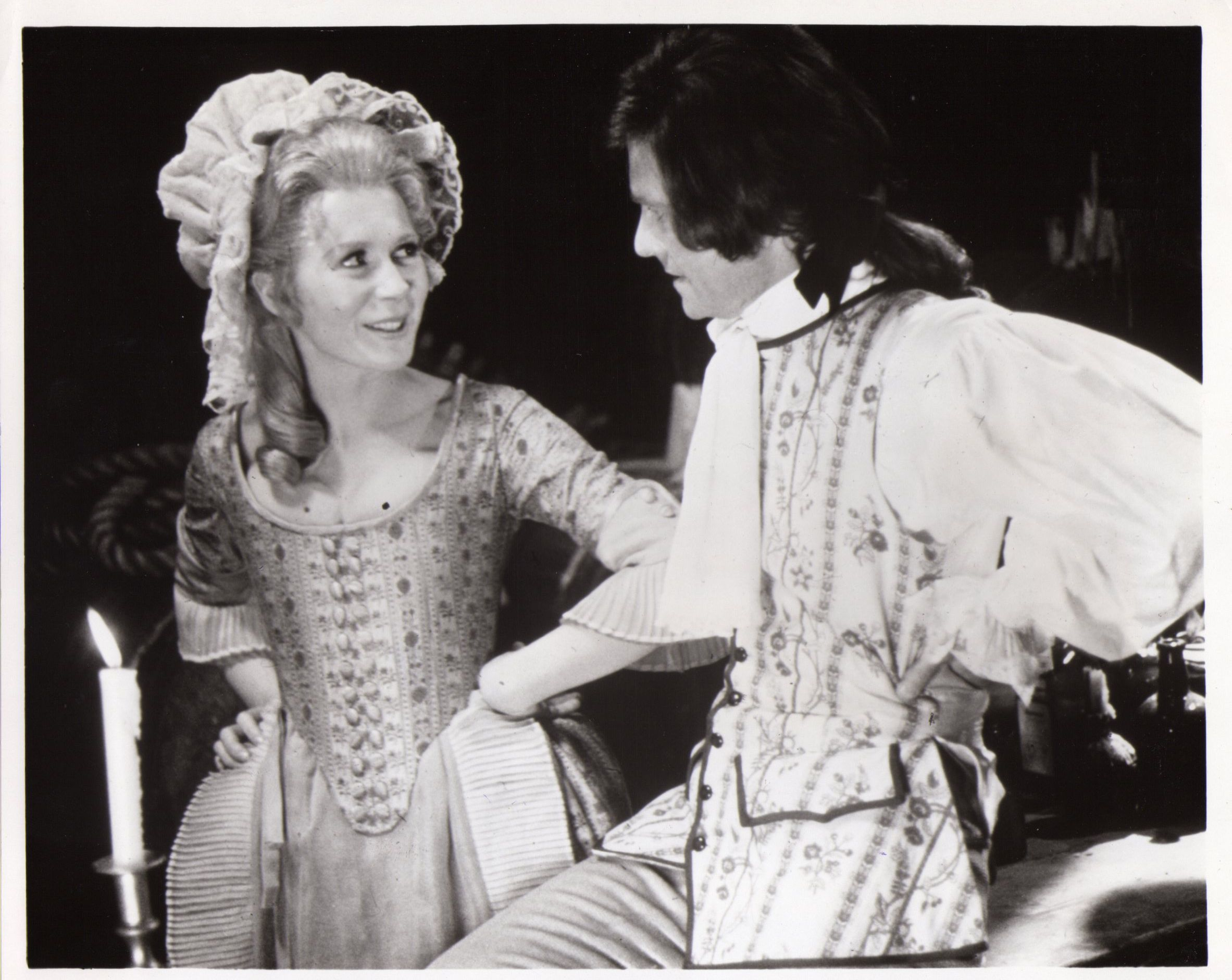
Juliet Mills and Tom Courtenay in a 1971 BBC production of the play.

== Plot ==
=== Act I ===
Act I begins at the Hardcastles' home in the countryside. Mrs. Hardcastle complains to her husband that they never leave their rural home to see the new things happening in the city. Hardcastle says he loves everything old, including his old wife. Mrs. Hardcastle says she was a young woman when she had her first husband's son, Tony, and he is not yet twenty-one; Hardcastle complains about Tony's immaturity and love of pranks. Tony enters on his way to a pub, and his mother follows him offstage, begging him to stay and spend time with them.

Hardcastle's daughter Kate enters. He remarks on her fashionable clothing, which he dislikes. Kate reminds him of their deal: she wears what she likes in the morning and dresses in the old-fashioned style he prefers at night. Hardcastle then reveals big news: his friend Sir Charles's son, Marlow, is coming to visit, and Hardcastle hopes Kate and Marlow will marry. Hardcastle says Marlow has a reputation for being handsome, intelligent and very modest. Kate likes all but the last part of this description and resolves to try to make a good impression on Marlow.

Hardcastle exits, leaving Kate to think over her visitor. She is joined by her cousin Constance, whom she tells about Marlow's impending visit. Constance tells her that she knows Marlow: he is the best friend of her suitor, Hastings. The odd thing about Marlow is that he is terribly shy around upper-class women, and therefore often seduces lower-class women instead. Mrs. Hardcastle wants Constance to marry her cousin, Tony, so that Constance's inherited jewels stay in the family. Constance tells Kate that she pretends to be willing to marry Tony so that Mrs. Hardcastle won't suspect she loves Hastings. Luckily for Constance, Tony doesn't want to marry Constance any more than she wants to marry him.

The scene changes to a bar, where Tony is drinking with a group of lower-class men. The bar's owner says that two fashionable-looking men have arrived who say they are looking for Mr. Hardcastle's house. Tony realizes that this must be Marlow and decides to trick Marlow into believing that Hardcastle's house is an inn.

=== Act II ===
Act II begins with Hardcastle trying to teach his servants how to behave in front of his guests. Soon after, Marlow and Hastings arrive at what they believe to be an inn. Hardcastle enters and tries to engage his guests in conversation, but the two young men ignore what he says, believing him to be a lowly innkeeper. Hardcastle is shocked by their rude, presumptuous treatment of him.

Marlow insists on being shown his room, so Hardcastle accompanies him. When Hastings is left alone, Constance enters. Upon hearing that Hastings believes he is in an inn, she guesses it is a trick of Tony. Hastings says that they should keep Marlow's mistake from him, because he will be embarrassed and leave immediately if he learns the truth. Hastings urges Constance to elope with him, but she is reluctant to lose her fortune: the jewels, which she will only inherit if she marries with her aunt's permission. She promises to run away with him once she has the jewels.

Marlow returns, complaining that Hardcastle will not leave him alone. Hastings tells Marlow that by coincidence, Constance and her cousin Kate are both at this inn. Marlow freezes in anxiety. Kate enters and tries to engage Marlow in conversation, but once Hastings and Constance leave Kate and Marlow alone, Marlow is too nervous to complete his sentences or even look at Kate's face. He ends the conversation abruptly and rushes off. Before exiting the stage, Kate reflects to herself that if he weren't so shy, she would be interested in him.

Tony and Constance enter, followed by Hastings and Mrs. Hardcastle. Constance makes a show of flirting with Tony for Mrs. Hardcastle, while he tries to repel her advances. Hastings chats with Mrs. Hardcastle and she points out Constance and Tony, saying that they are betrothed. Tony objects to this loudly. Hastings tells Mrs. Hardcastle that he will try to talk some sense into Tony, and Constance and Mrs. Hardcastle exit. Hastings reveals to Tony that he loves Constance and wants to elope with her. Tony is thrilled and promises to help the couple any way he can.

=== Act III ===
Act III begins with Hardcastle and Kate comparing their very different impressions of Marlow. He expresses shock at Marlow's boldness, while she finds him incredibly shy. Kate convinces her father that they should give Marlow another chance to see what his true character is.

Tony presents Hastings with a box containing Constance's jewels, which he stole from his mother's drawers. Constance and Mrs. Hardcastle enter, and Hastings exits. Constance tries to convince her aunt to let her try on her jewels, but Mrs. Hardcastle will not relent. Tony suggests that Mrs. Hardcastle tell Constance the jewels are missing, which she does, upsetting Constance deeply. Tony reassures Constance privately, telling her that he gave her jewels to Hastings, who is preparing for their elopement. Meanwhile, Mrs. Hardcastle has discovered the jewels are indeed missing. Tony teases his distressed mother, and the two of them exit.

Kate enters accompanied by her maid Pimple and wearing the old-fashioned dress her father prefers. She has learned about Tony's prank and laughs at Marlow's belief that he is in an inn. Pimple says that earlier today Marlow mistook Kate for the inn's barmaid. Kate says she will take advantage of the mistake, which will enable him to talk to her without such shyness. Pimple exits, and Marlow enters. Kate, pretending to be a maid, speaks to Marlow in the accent of a lower-class woman. Marlow finds her beautiful and immediately begins to flirt with her. He tries to kiss her, but Hardcastle walks into the room and sees them. Marlow flees the room, and Hardcastle tells Kate he is determined to throw Marlow out of his house. Kate persuades her father to give her time to prove to him that Marlow is not what he seems.

=== Act IV ===
Act IV begins with Constance and Hastings planning their elopement. Constance tells Hastings that she has heard Sir Charles will soon be arriving, and Hastings tells Constance that he has entrusted her box of jewels to Marlow to keep them safe. They both exit.

Marlow enters, congratulating himself on thinking to give the box of jewels to the landlady (i.e., Mrs. Hardcastle) to keep it safe. Hastings enters, and Marlow tells him he stashed the jewels securely with the landlady. Hastings conceals his disappointment that Mrs. Hardcastle has the jewels back and leaves.

Hardcastle enters and begins to argue with Marlow, whose servants have gotten drunk. Storming away, Hardcastle says he would never have predicted such rudeness from Sir Charles's son. Marlow is confused by this remark, but at that moment, Kate enters. Marlow, beginning to understand something is amiss, asks Kate where they are, and she tells him that they are at Mr. Hardcastle's house. Marlow is horrified at his error. Kate does not yet reveal her true identity, pretending instead to be a poor relation of the family. Marlow announces his departure, and Kate weeps at the news. He is touched to see how much she cares about him.

Tony and Constance discuss her plan to elope with Hastings, even without the jewels. Mrs. Hardcastle enters and the two cousins pretend to flirt so she won't suspect the planned elopement. A letter comes from Hastings addressed to Tony, but because Tony cannot read, his mother reads it to him. The letter reveals the plan for the elopement. Mrs. Hardcastle is furious and tells Constance she is sending her far away to Aunt Pedigree's house. Hastings enters and yells at Tony for giving away the secret. Marlow enters and yells at both Tony and Hastings for deceiving him about where he is. Constance is utterly distraught and begs Hastings to stay faithful to her even if they have to wait several years to marry. After Constance leaves, Tony tells Hastings to meet him in the garden in two hours, promising to make it all up to him.

=== Act V ===
In Act V, Hardcastle and the newly arrived Sir Charles laugh over Marlow's having mistaken the home for an inn. Hardcastle says that he saw Marlow take Kate's hand, and he thinks that they will marry. Marlow enters and formally apologizes to Hardcastle. Hardcastle says it doesn't matter, since Marlow and Kate will soon marry, but Marlow denies having feelings for Kate. When Hardcastle refuses to believe him, Marlow storms out. Kate enters and assures the two fathers that Marlow likes her. She tells the two fathers to hide behind a screen in half an hour to see proof of Marlow's feelings.

Out in the garden, Tony arrives and tells Hastings that he has driven his mother and Constance in a circle instead of taking them to Aunt Pedigree's house. Mrs. Hardcastle is terrified, thinking they are lost in dangerous territory. Hastings rushes off to find Constance. Elsewhere in the garden, Hastings tries to convince Constance to elope with him. She says she is too exhausted from the stress of the night to run off. Instead she wants to explain their situation to Hardcastle and hope that he can influence his wife to allow their marriage.

Inside the house, Hardcastle and Sir Charles hide behind a screen and watch Marlow and Kate talk. Kate no longer pretends to be a barmaid, but speaks in her normal voice. Marlow says he wishes he could stay with her, but he does not want to disappoint his family by marrying someone of lower birth. Kate tells him she has the same background as the woman he came to see. Marlow kneels before her, and the two fathers burst out from behind the screen, asking why he lied to them about his feelings for Kate. Marlow learns Kate's true identity and is embarrassed again at having been so deceived.

Mrs. Hardcastle and Tony enter (Mrs. Hardcastle having realized where she is). Mrs. Hardcastle says that Constance and Hastings have run off together, but she is consoled by the fact that she will get to keep Constance's jewels. At that moment, however, Hastings and Constance enter. Sir Charles recognizes Hastings and tells Hardcastle that he is a good man. Hardcastle asks Tony if he is really sure that he doesn't want to marry his cousin. Tony says he is sure, but that it doesn't matter, since he cannot formally refuse to marry Constance until he is twenty-one. Hardcastle then reveals that Mrs. Hardcastle has been hiding the fact that Tony is in fact already twenty-one. At this, Tony says he will not marry Constance, freeing her to marry Hastings and keep her fortune. Everyone except Mrs. Hardcastle is thrilled that the two young couples – Hastings and Constance, and Marlow and Kate – will marry.

== Productions ==
The original production premiered in London at Covent Garden Theatre on 15 March 1773 with Mary Bulkley as Constantia Hardcastle, and was immediately successful. In the nineteenth century, actor and comedian Lionel Brough debuted as Tony Lumpkin in 1869 and continued to play the character in 1777 performances, whilst an 1881 production of the play was socialite and actress Lillie Langtry's first big success.

In 1964, the play was staged by the Edinburgh Gateway Company, directed by Victor Carin. It was chosen by the Angles Theatre company to relaunch the Georgian Angles Theatre in 1978, about 130 years after it closed. An incident in a nearby house in Leverington may have been the basis of the play. Goldsmith is supposed to have visited his friends the Lumpkins at their home Parkfield, Leverington. Lumpkin moved to Wisbech later and this play was very popular in the local theatre.

Perhaps one of the most famous modern incarnations of She Stoops to Conquer was Peter Hall's version, staged in 1993 and starring Miriam Margolyes as Mrs. Hardcastle. The most famous TV production is the 1971 version featuring Ralph Richardson, Tom Courtenay, Juliet Mills, and Brian Cox, with Trevor Peacock as Tony Lumpkin. Courtenay, Mills, and Peacock also performed in this play at The Garrick Theatre, London, in 1969. The 1971 version was shot on location near Ross-on-Wye, Herefordshire, and is part of the BBC archive. This play was one of 13 BBC productions that formed the series of thirteen British and European plays called Classic Theatre, the Humanities in Drama. The series was funded in the U.S. by the National Endowment for the Humanities and used as a study aid on video tape by thousands of U.S. students.

In 2008 the play was again produced in Wisbech. The story goes that Oliver Goldsmith wrote the play while staying with the Lumpkin family at Park House in Leverington, near Wisbech and that he lampooned his friend, Nicholas Lumpkin, by turning him into his famous creation, Tony Lumpkin. The real Lumpkin moved to Wisbech after his money ran out.

== Type of comedy ==
When the play was first produced, it was discussed as an example of the revival of laughing comedy over the sentimental comedy seen as dominant on the English stage since the success of The Conscious Lovers, written by Sir Richard Steele in 1722. An essay published in a London magazine in 1773, entitled "An Essay on the Theatre; Or, A Comparison between Laughing And Sentimental Comedy", argued that sentimental comedy, a false form of comedy, had taken over the boards from the older and more truly comic laughing comedy.

Some theatre historians believe the essay was written by Goldsmith as a puff piece for She Stoops to Conquer as an exemplar of the "laughing comedy". Goldsmith's name was linked with that of Richard Brinsley Sheridan, author of The Rivals and The School for Scandal, as standard-bearers for the resurgent laughing comedy.

The play might also be seen as a comedy of manners in which the comedy arises from the gap between the standards of behaviour the characters regard as proper in polite society, and the more informal behaviours they are prepared to indulge or deploy in settings they deem less constrained by such standards. Kate's stooping and Marlow's nervousness are also examples of romantic comedy, as are Constance Neville's and George Hastings' love and plan to elope.

== Title ==
The title refers to Kate's ruse of pretending to be a barmaid to reach her goal. It originates in Act 3 of John Dryden's Amphitryon, which Goldsmith may have seen misquoted by Lord Chesterfield. In Chesterfield's version, the lines in question read: "The prostrate lover, when he lowest lies, But stoops to conquer, and but kneels to rise." In Dryden's original, the lines are: "The offending lover, when he lowest lies, Submits, to conquer; and but kneels to rise."

== Characters ==
- Charles Marlow – The central male character, who has set out to court the young attractive Kate Hardcastle. A well-educated man, "bred a scholar", Marlow is brash and rude to Mr. Hardcastle, owner of "Liberty Hall" (a reference to another site in London), whom Marlow believes to be an innkeeper. Marlow is sophisticated and has travelled the world. Around working-class women Marlow is a lecherous rogue, but around those of an upper-class card he is a nervous, bumbling fool.
- George Hastings – Friend of Charles Marlow and the admirer of Miss Constance Neville. Hastings is an educated man who cares deeply about Constance, with the intention of fleeing to France with her.
- Tony Lumpkin – Son of Mrs Hardcastle and stepson to Mr Hardcastle, Tony is a mischievous, uneducated playboy.
- Mr. Hardcastle – The father of Kate Hardcastle but he is mistaken by Marlow and Hastings as an innkeeper.
- Mrs. Hardcastle – Wife to Mr. Hardcastle and mother to Tony, Mrs. Hardcastle is a corrupt and eccentric character. She is an over-protective mother to Tony, whom she loves, but fails to tell him he's of age so that he is eligible to receive £1,500 a year.
- Miss Kate Hardcastle – Daughter to Mr. Hardcastle, and the play's stooping-to-conquer heroine.
- Miss Constance Neville – Niece of Mrs. Hardcastle, she is the woman whom Hastings intends to court.
- Sir Charles Marlow – An aristocratic gentleman and father of Charles Marlow; he follows his son, a few hours behind.

== Reception ==
Goldsmith's friend and contemporary Samuel Johnson greatly admired the play. James Boswell quoted him as saying, "I know of no comedy for many years that has so much exhilarated an audience that it has answered so much the great end of comedy – making an audience merry".

== Adaptations ==
There have been a number of film and television adaptations of the play over the years:

- She Stoops to Conquer, a 1910 silent movie starring Anna Rosemond
- She Stoops to Conquer, a 1914 silent movie directed by George Loane Tucker and starring Henry Ainley and Jane Gail
- She Stoops to Conquer, a 1923 silent movie directed by Edwin Greenwood
- She Stoops to Conquer, a 1939 adaptation for television starring Morris Harvey, Renee De Vaux and James Hayter
- She Stoops to Conquer, a 1971 BBC television production starring Tom Courtenay, Juliet Mills, Ralph Richardson, Thora Hird, Trevor Peacock and Brian Cox
- Ночь ошибок (A Night of Mistakes), Soviet television play directed by Mikhail Kozakov in 1974
- The Kissing Dance, a musical by Howard Goodall and Charles Hart: 1998, for the National Youth Music Theatre of Britain
- She Stoops to Conquer, a 2003 video presentation recorded live on stage in Bath, Somerset, England
- She Stoops to Conquer, a 2008 television adaptation directed by Tony Britten and starring Tim Bell, Simon Butteriss, Judi Daykin and Mark Dexter

The play was adapted as an opera by George Macfarren.
