= Omai (play) =

1785 play

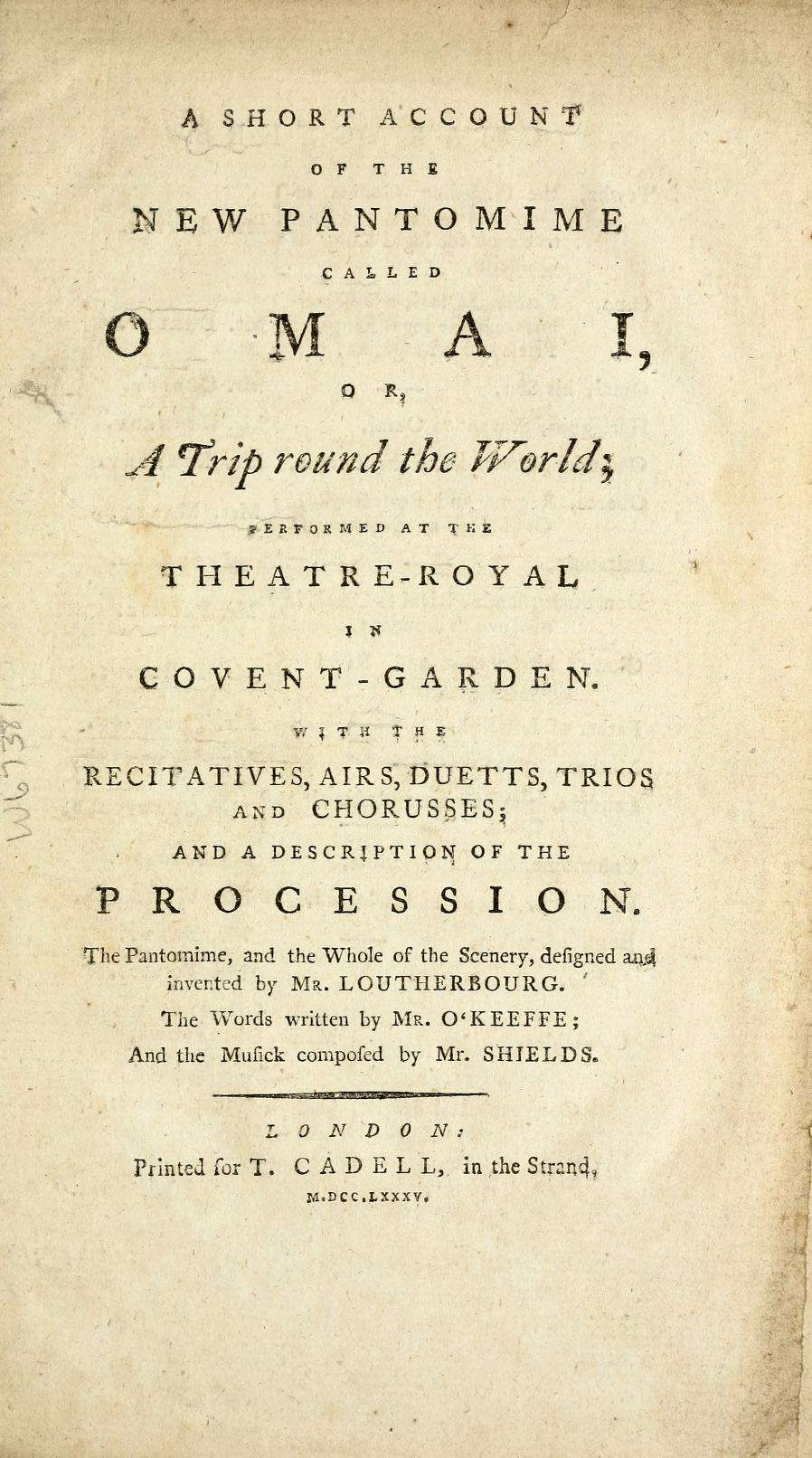
- Written by: John O'Keeffe
- Original language: English
- Genre: Comedy

Premiere
- Date premiered: 20 December 1785
- Place premiered: Covent Garden Theatre

Omai is a 1785 pantomime written by John O'Keeffe with music by William Shield. It depicts the voyage of Omai, a Tahitian royal, to marry Londina the fictional daughter of Britannia. It was loosely inspired by the real visit of Omai to Europe in the 1770s and the final voyage of the explorer Captain James Cook leading up to his dramatic death in 1779. Its full name is Omai: or, a trip round the world

== Production ==
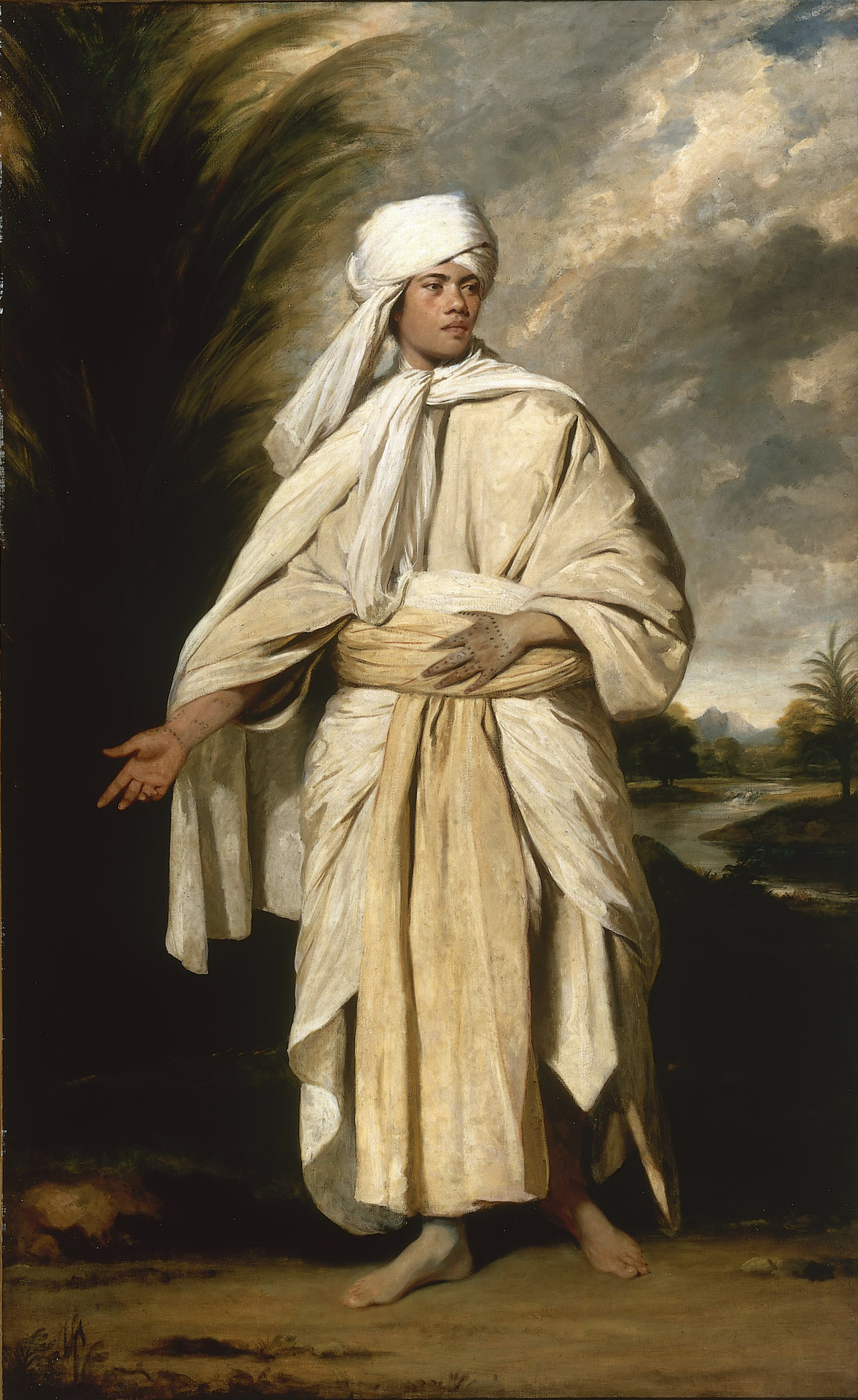
1776 Portrait of Omai by Joshua Reynolds.

The sets were designed by Philip James de Loutherbourg who took great care to try to make his depictions as authentic as possible by studying sketches made on all three of Cook's voyages and consulting with John Webber an artist who had sailed with Cook. The two artists had a complex working relationship, and there is still scholarly debate about attribution of some of the drawings done for the play, which although traditionally ascribed to Loutherbourg, may have also been done by Webber.

The play was produced a year and a half after official Admiralty records of Cook's final voyage were released and played a major part in the hero-isation of Cook. Although much of its material was intentionally whimsical and inaccurate, it helped shape Western views of the Pacific Ocean and its inhabitants. It was first performed at Covent Garden Theatre in December 1785 an afterpiece to Nicholas Rowe's Jane Shore.

== Synopsis ==
Omai, the heir to the throne of Tahiti, is due to marry Londina, the daughter of Britannia, which will symbolically join the two countries together. However Omai has a number of rivals, who wish to prevent the marriage and the union of the two countries. To escape them he and Londina embark on a voyage that takes them through various destinations visited by Cook including Kamchatka, Antarctica, New Zealand, Tonga and Hawaii.

== Bibliography ==
- Claydon, Tony & McBride, Ian. Protestantism and National Identity: Britain and Ireland 1650-1850. Cambridge University Press, 1998.
