= Tony Lumpkin =

Theatrical character in "She Stoops To Conquer"

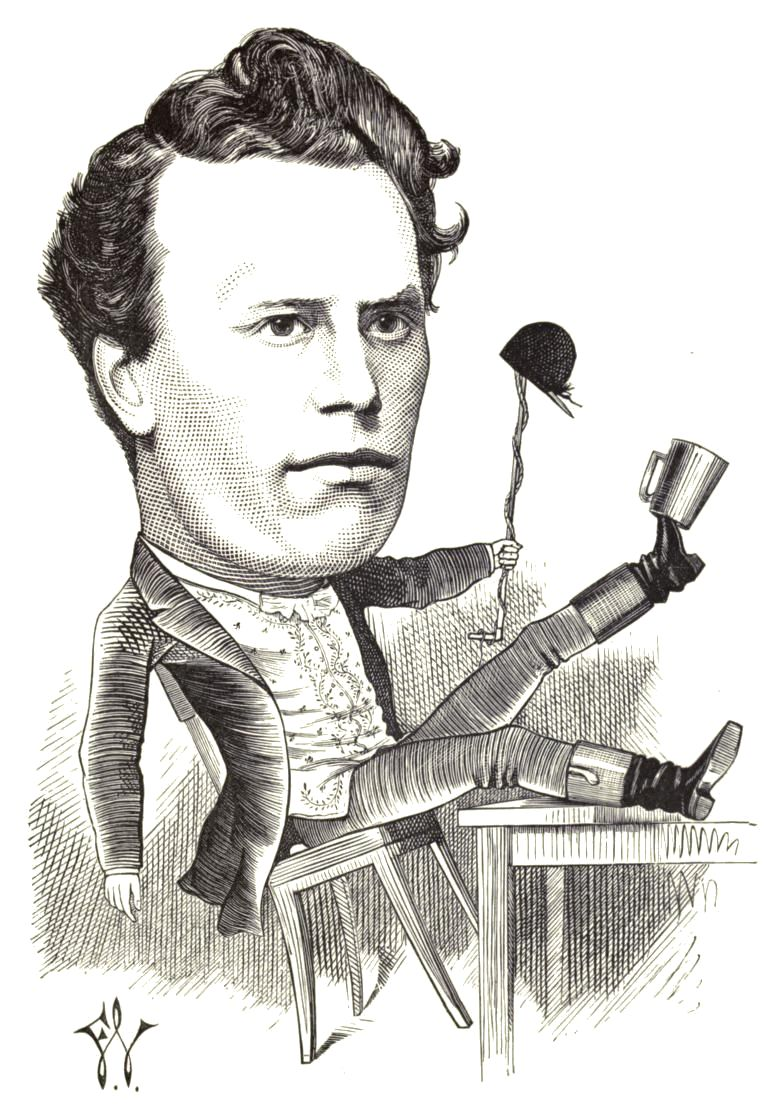
Lionel Brough portraying "Tony Lumpkin", as drawn by Frederick Waddy (1872)

Tony Lumpkin is a fictional character who first appeared in Oliver Goldsmith's play, She Stoops to Conquer. He may have been based on one of Goldsmith's friends. The story goes that Oliver Goldsmith wrote the play while staying with the Lumpkin family at Park House in Leverington, near Wisbech and that he lampooned his friend, Nicholas Lumpkin, by turning him into his famous creation, Tony Lumpkin.

Tony Lumpkin is the son of Mrs Hardcastle and stepson to Mr Hardcastle. It is as a result of his practical joking that the comic aspects of the play are set up. When he accidentally meets Charles Marlow and his friend Hastings, who are coming to see Tony's parents in order to put Marlow forward as a suitor to Tony's stepsister Kate, he deliberately misdirects them, causing them to believe that the house where they are bound is an inn and that the Hardcastles are its landlord and landlady.

Tony is promised in marriage to his cousin, Constance Neville, which he despises, and therefore he assists in her plans to elope with Hastings. Tony takes an interest in horses, "Bet Bouncer" and especially the alehouse, where he joyfully sings with members of the lower-classes. It is Tony's initial deception of Marlow, for a joke, which sets up the plot.

Reportedly the part was originally intended for the Irish actor William Hamilton but he was replaced by John Quick before the production. The character became so popular that he was later used in a 1778 afterpiece play, Tony Lumpkin in Town, by John O'Keeffe.

The play was still popular in England in the mid-nineteenth century, where it was being played by the likes of Lionel Brough. She Stoops to Conquer was chosen as the play to relaunch the Georgian Angles Theatre in Wisbech, the town where the real Lumpkin moved to from Leverington after spending all his money.
