= Mai (Ra'iatean man) =

Pacific Islander that visited European countries

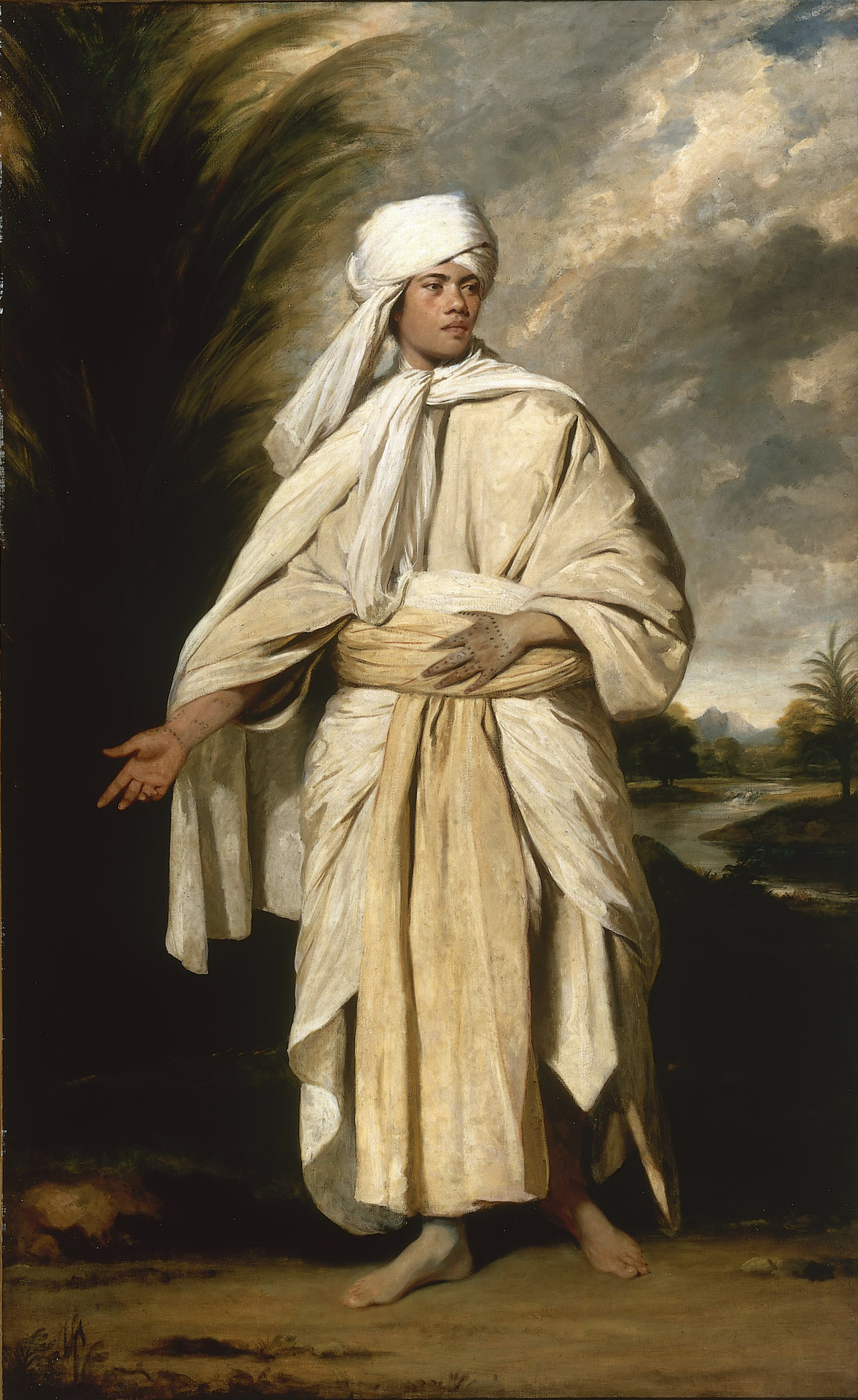
- Portrait of Omai, a South Sea Islander who travelled to Great Britain with the second expedition of Captain Cook – Sir Joshua Reynolds, 1776
- Born: Mai c. 1751; Ra'iatea, Society Islands, Polynesia
- Died: c. 1780 (aged 28–29); Huahine, Society Islands, Polynesia
- Known for: Being the second Pacific Islander to visit European countries, and the first to visit Great Britain.; Being painted by Joshua Reynolds among others.

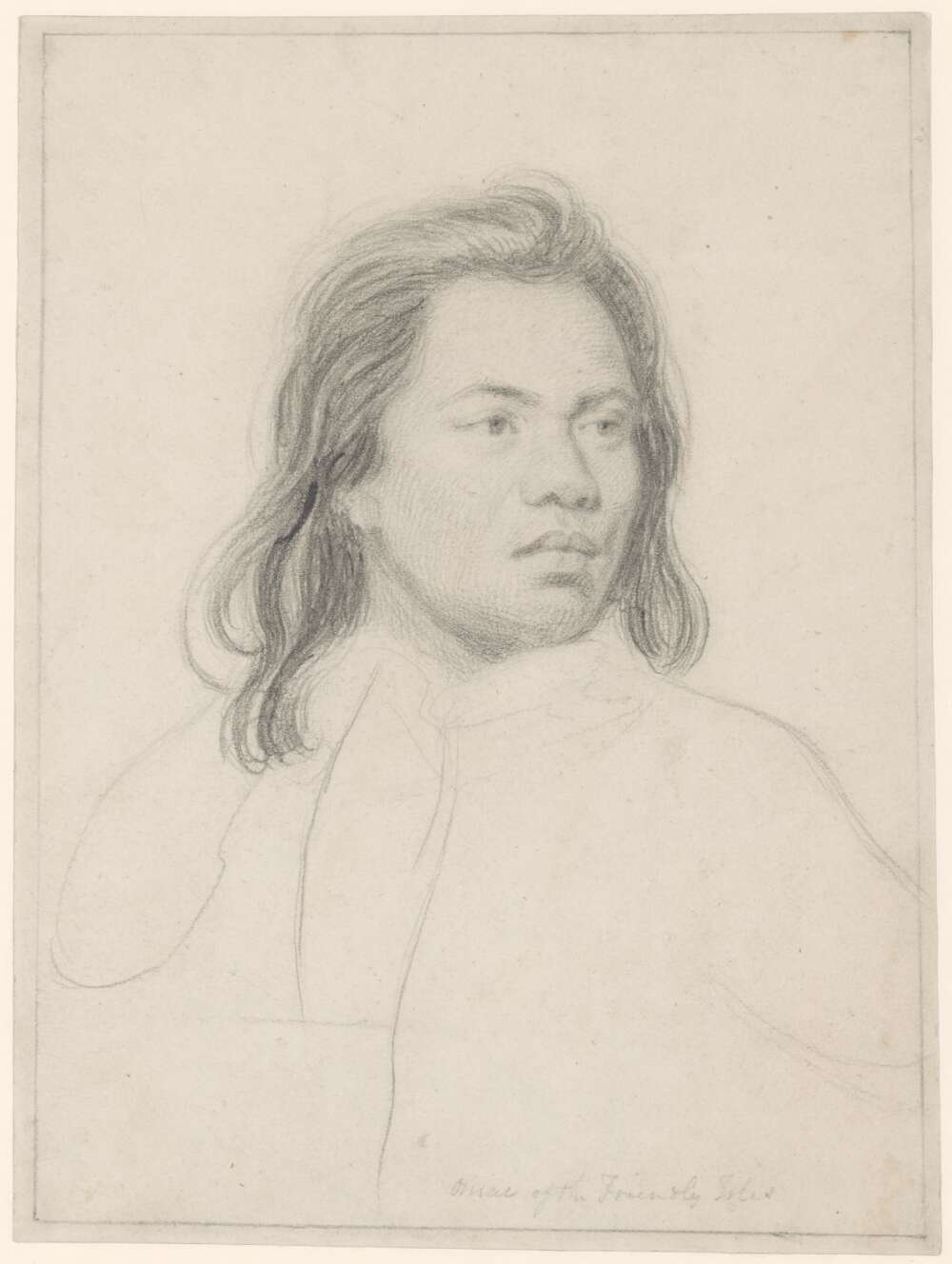
Omai of the Friendly Isles by Sir Joshua Reynolds, c.1774

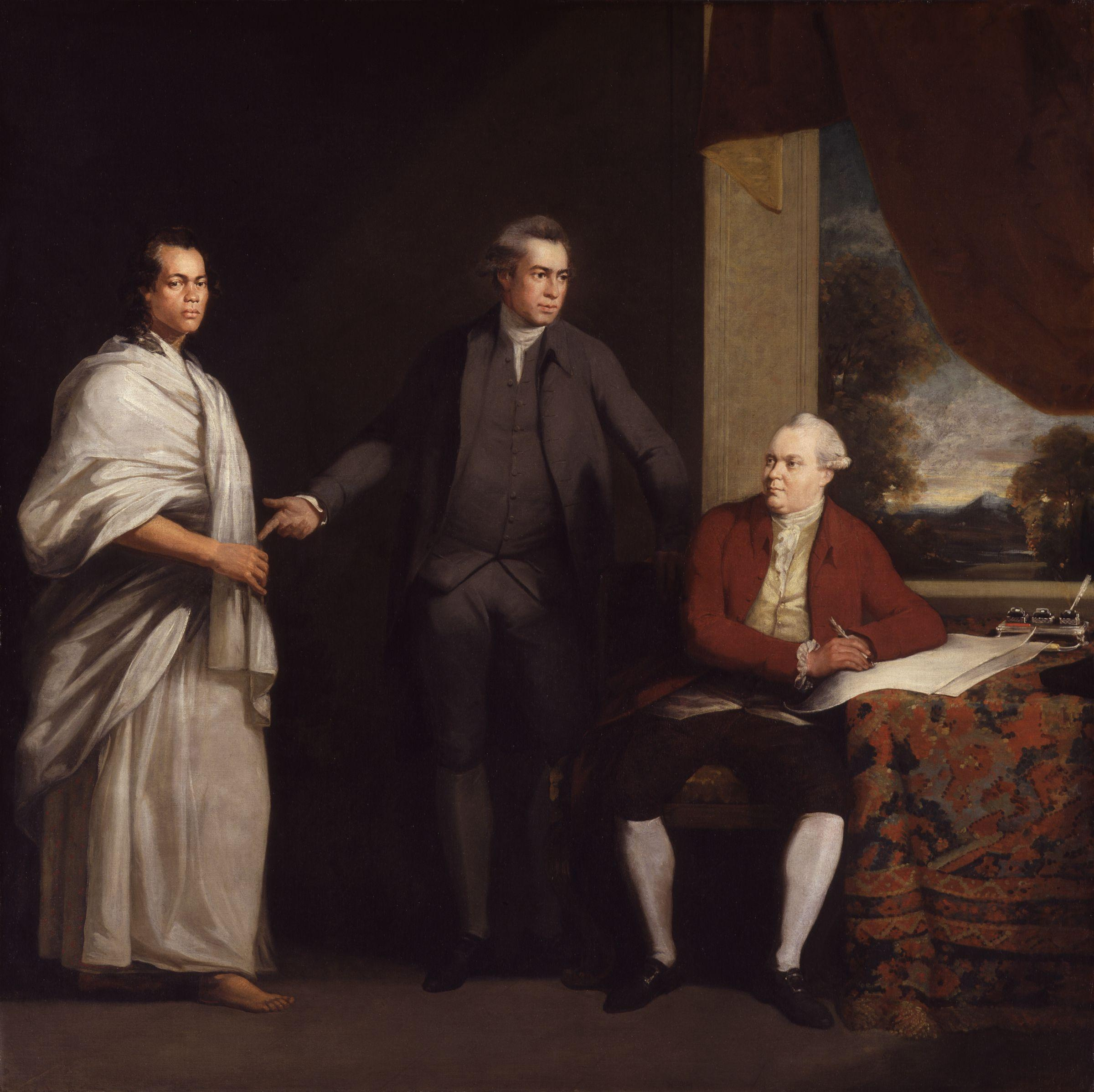
William Parry's painting Sir Joseph Banks with Omai and Dr Daniel Solander, circa 1775–76

Mai (c. 1751–1779), also known as Omai in European countries, (Note: Omai is a mistranslation of his name which became widely adopted in European countries. In the Tahitian language, O was an article meaning "it is", making it a redundancy.) was a young Ra'iatean man who became the first Pacific Islander to visit Great Britain, and the second to visit European countries, after Ahutoru, who was brought to Paris by Bougainville in 1768.

== Life ==
Mai, born c. 1751, described himself as a hoa, or 'attendant upon the king', the son of a Ra'iatea landowner. His father was killed by Puni's Bora Boran warriors. Fleeing to Tahiti, Ma'i was wounded in the encounter with the Dolphin in 1767. Mai then became an apprentice to a priest. Returning to Ra'iatea, he was captured and taken to Borabora. Narrowly escaping death there, he escaped to Huahine.

Mai met Samuel Wallis in 1767 and Captain James Cook in 1769 in Tahiti. In August 1773 he embarked from Huahine on the British ship HMS Adventure, commanded by Tobias Furneaux, which had previously touched at Tahiti as part of Cook's second voyage of discovery in the Pacific. Mai travelled to Europe on Adventure, arriving at London in October 1774 where he was introduced into British society by the naturalist Sir Joseph Banks (whom he had also met during Cook's first voyage). As further coincidence, Mai had as a boy served as a religious assistant to Tupaia, another Polynesian who Joseph Banks had sponsored and attempted to bring back to England on Cook's first voyage, but Tupaia had died en route back to England. Banks thus had a second opportunity to introduce a Polynesian to British society.

During his two-year stay in Great Britain, Mai became much admired within London high society. Renowned for his charm, quick wit and exotic good looks, he quickly became a favourite of the aristocratic elite. Banks regularly invited Mai to dine with the Royal Society and arranged meetings with notable celebrities, including Lord Sandwich, Dr Samuel Johnson, Frances Burney and Anna Seward, among others. Richard Holmes remarks that Mai's idiosyncratic behaviour and distinctive bow were widely celebrated. During a meeting with King George III at Kew, Mai is said to have delivered his bow then grasped the King's hand, declaring, "How do, King Tosh!", an attempt at pronouncing "George", though the King did not seem to mind.

He was painted by Sir Joshua Reynolds, among others. In Reynolds' Portrait of Omai, he is depicted in a version of ceremonial Tahitian dress: a form of dress that Mai may have in some ways aspired to because it was associated with Tahitian nobility and the priestly classes. In 2001, the portrait sold for "the second highest price ever paid for a British picture", according to the Antiques Trade Gazette. Mai's journey to England and subsequent return to Tahiti with Cook's third voyage in 1776 became the subject of a theatrical production, written and directed by the dramatist John O'Keefe, entitled Omai – A Voyage ‘round the World that was performed during the 1785 Christmas season at the Theatre Royal in Covent Garden.

Mai returned to Huahine in August 1777, where Cook built him a European-style house, and provided furniture, gunpowder weapons, a vineyard, and two Māori boys as servants. During the Bounty's visit to Tahiti in 1789, Captain Bligh was told that a couple years after Cook's departure in November 1777, Mai had died. According to Richard Connaughton, the "consensus" is that he died in 1780, within 30 months of Cook's departure while still only in his 20s, probably of natural causes, possibly from an infectious disease. Before he died, he used his gunpowder weapons to fight a major battle against a competing tribe, which was a victory.
