= The Shamrock =

Irish theatrical work

The Shamrock is a 1777 Irish play or pasticcio opera by John O'Keeffe. It was first staged on 15 April 1777 at Crow Street Theatre in Dublin. According to White (1983), it is unsure whether the work was performed as a straight play or as a pasticcio opera to music by William Shield, as in its altered version as an afterpiece for the London stage, The Poor Soldier (1783).

== Bibliography ==
- Brasmer, William & Osborne, William (eds.): The Poor Soldier (1783) (Madison, Wisconsin: A-R Editions, 1978)
