= The Poor Soldier =

1783 British opera

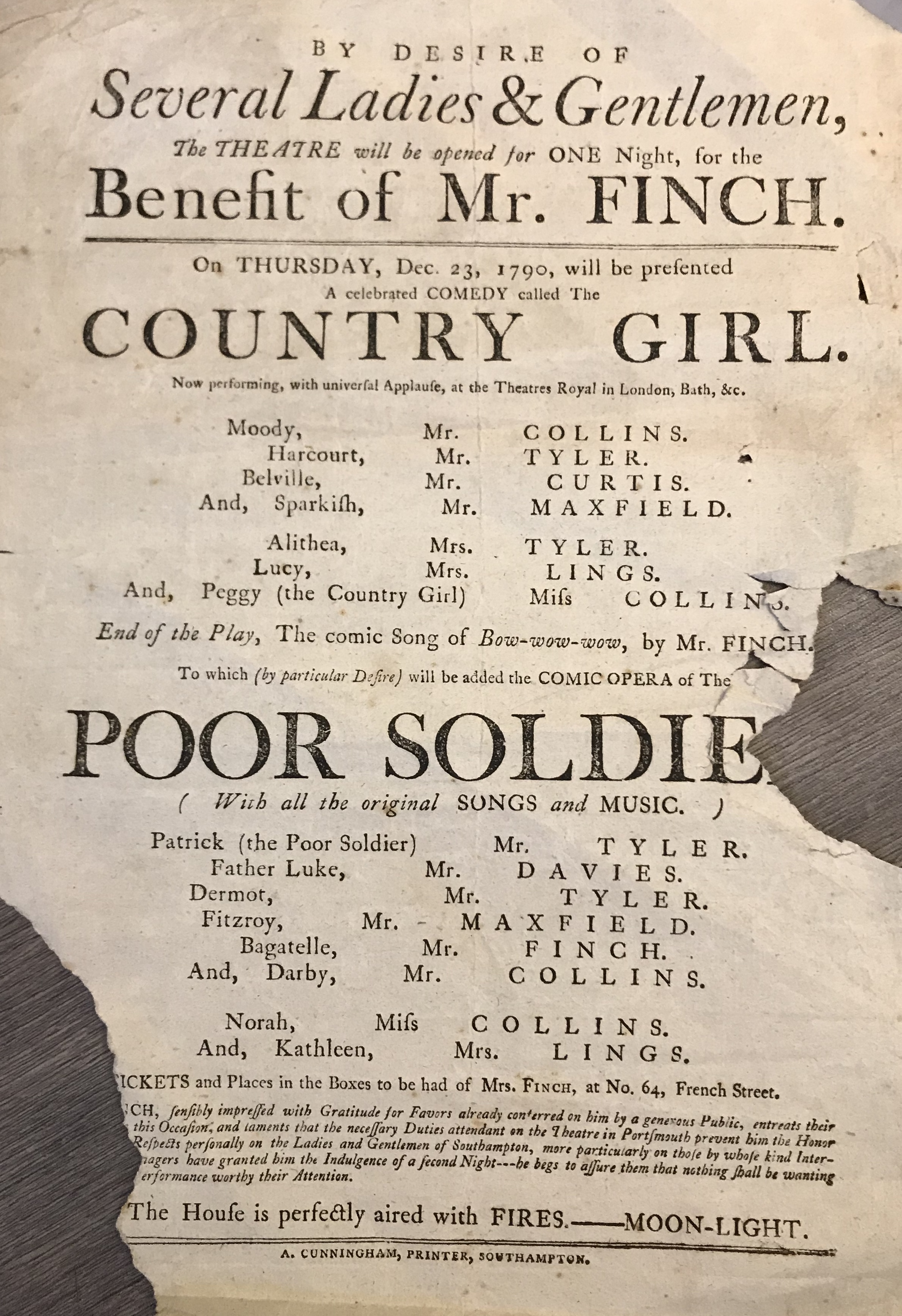
Playbill for a 1790 performance of the opera at Theatre Royal, Southampton

The Poor Soldier is a 1783 British pasticcio opera with music by William Shield and a text by John O'Keeffe. It was a comedy set around Irish soldiers returning home after fighting in the British army in the American War of Independence, which formally ended that year with the Peace of Paris. One of the redcoats must fight for the love of Norah with the urbane Captain Fitzroy. The events are set entirely in a small Irish village called Carton, a few miles from Dublin, although several versions refer to it only as "a country village".

The Poor Soldier was an altered version, as an afterpiece, of the earlier The Shamrock, or The Anniversary of St Patrick, first performed as a comic opera on 16 April 1777 at Crow Street Theatre, Dublin, followed by a London performance on 7 April 1783 at Covent Garden. The first performance of The Poor Soldier took place on 4 November 1783 at Covent Garden.

The work enjoyed widespread popularity in the newly independent United States, and was a favourite of George Washington.

The music by Shield was mostly based on Irish traditional tunes, which had been sung to Shield by the Irishman O'Keeffe, as in many other examples of the collaboration between Shield and O'Keeffe. One exception was the Scottish tune "Oh, whistle and I'll come to you, my lad", used for the song "Since love is the plan, I'll love if I can". The song "How Happy the Soldier" also featured in the opera.

In 1786, O'Keeffe wrote a sequel Love in a Camp, when the characters have joined the Prussian army.

== Bibliography ==
- Brasmer, William & Osborne, William (eds.): The Poor Soldier (1783) (Madison, Wisconsin: A-R Editions, 1978)
- Hager, Alan: Encyclopedia of British Writers: 16th, 17th & 18th Centuries (New York: Book Builders, 2005)
- McLucas, Anne Dhu: The Musical Ear: Oral Traditions in the USA (Farnham, Surrey: Ashgate, 2010)
- Richards, Jeffrey H.: Drama, Theatre and Identity in the American New Republic (Cambridge: Cambridge University Press, 2005)
- Shaffer, Jason: Performing Patriotism: National Identity in the Colonial and Revolutionary American Theater (Philadelphia: University of Pennsylvania Press, 2007)
