= Portrait of Omai =

Portrait by Sir Joshua Reynolds

Portrait of Mai (Omai)
- Portrait of Omai, Omai of the Friendly Isles
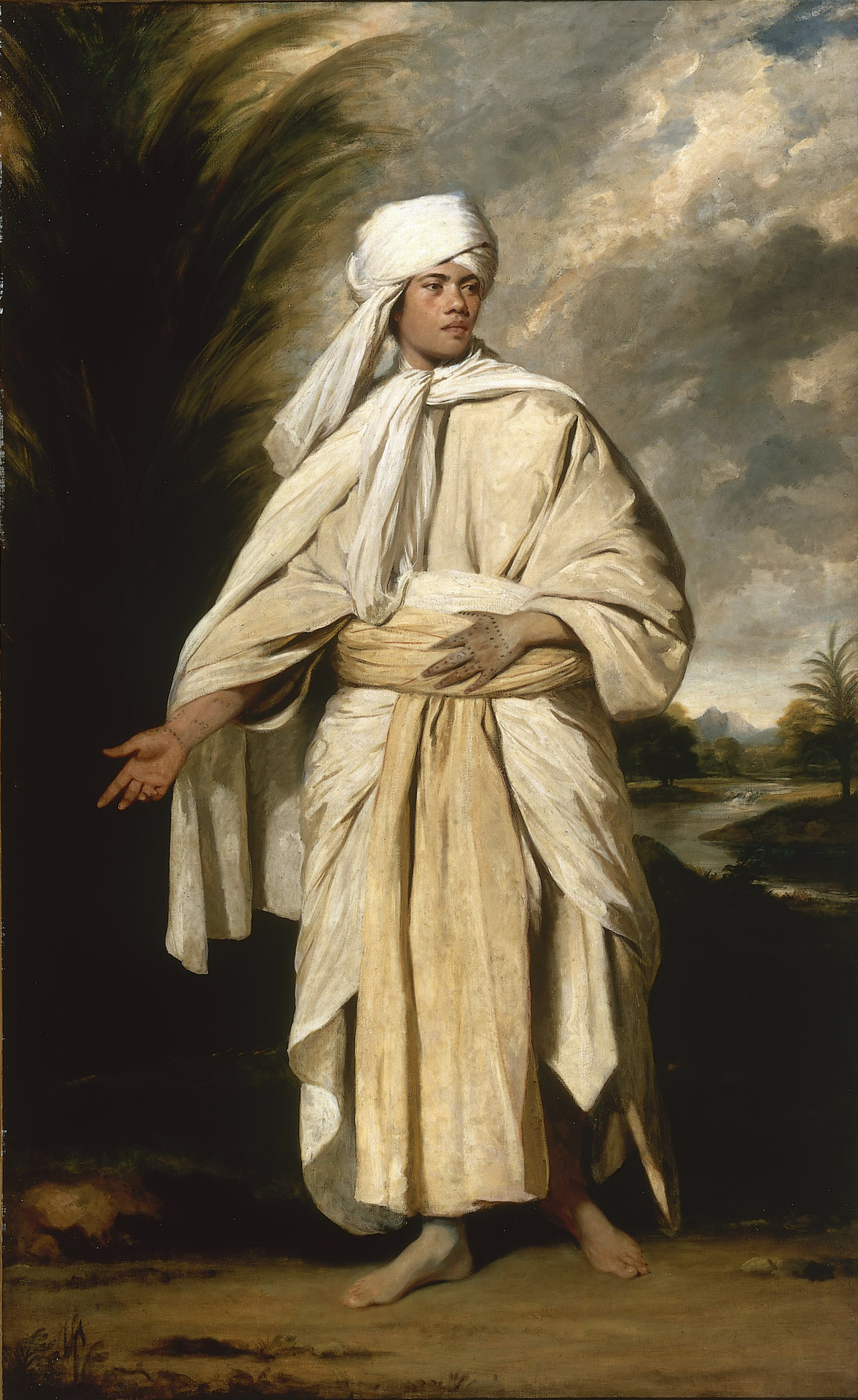
- Portrait of Mai (Omai) by Sir Joshua Reynolds, oil on canvas, c.1776
- Artist: Sir Joshua Reynolds
- Year: c. 1776
- Medium: Oil on canvas
- Subject: Omai
- Dimensions: 236 cm × 145.5 cm (93 in × 57.3 in)
- Location: National Portrait Gallery, London and The Getty Museum, Los Angeles
- Owner: National Portrait Gallery and The Getty Museum
- Accession: 25 April 2023

Portrait of Mai (Omai) (also known as Portrait of Omai, Omai of the Friendly Isles or simply Omai) is an oil-on-canvas portrait of Omai, a Polynesian visitor to the Kingdom of Great Britain, by Sir Joshua Reynolds, completed about 1776.

== Background ==
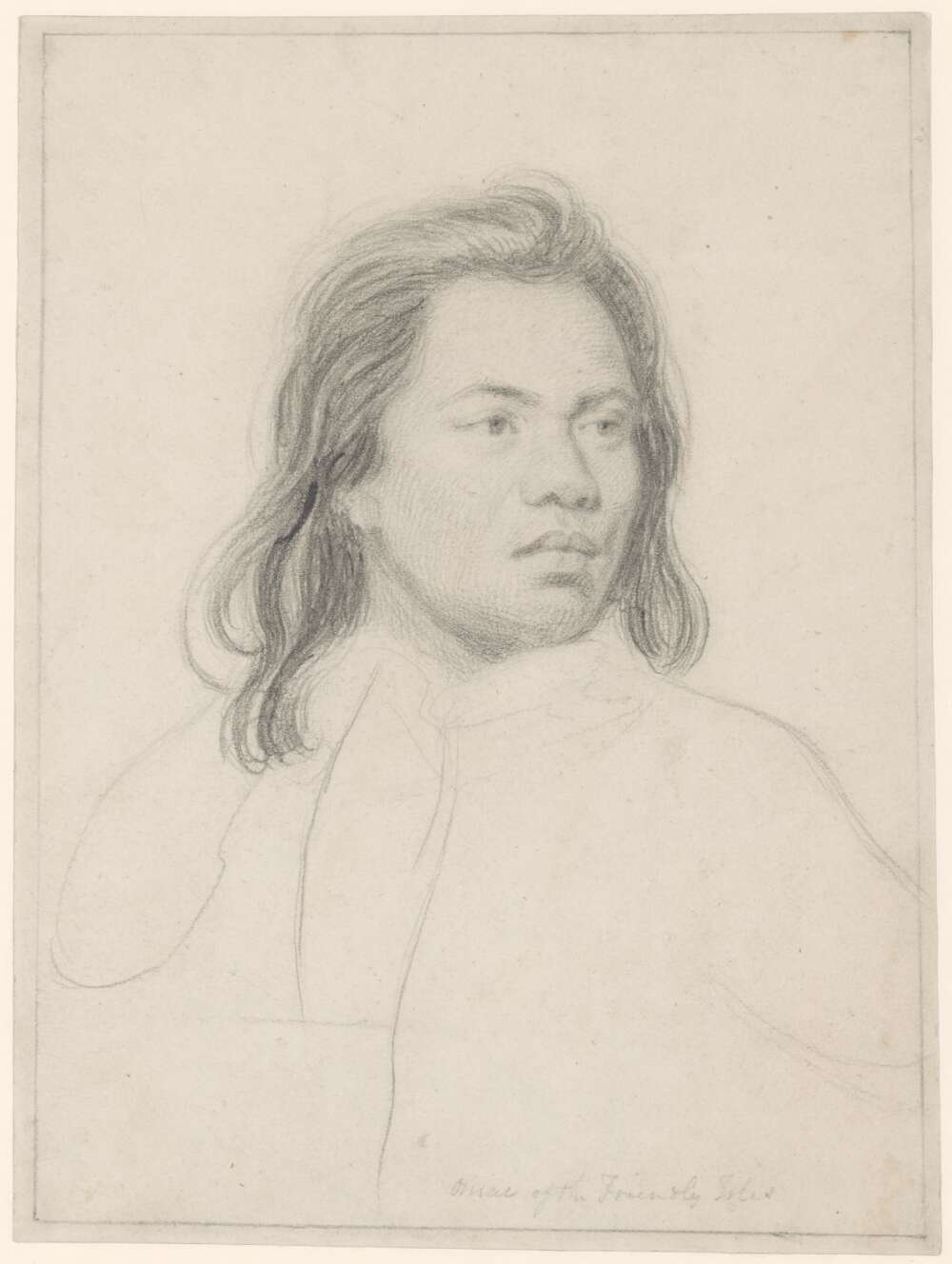
Sir Joshua Reynolds, Pencil sketch of Mai, Rex Nan Kivell Collection, National Library of Australia

Mai (known in English as Omai) left the Society Islands (specifically, Raiatea) with Commander Tobias Furneaux on his ship HMS Adventure. The Adventure had left Great Britain in 1772, accompanying Captain James Cook on his second voyage of discovery in the Pacific, and visited Tahiti and Huahine in 1773. After visiting New Zealand, Omai arrived in Great Britain on Furneaux's ship in July 1774.

Mai was admired by London society, staying with the President of the Royal Society Sir Joseph Banks and meeting King George III, Samuel Johnson, Frances Burney, and other English celebrities. He returned to the Pacific with Cook's third voyage in July 1776, arriving back on the island of Huahine in 1777. He stayed behind after Cook left in November 1777, and Mai died there in late 1779.

== Painting ==
Reynolds portrayed Mai as an exotic figure—an idealized depiction echoing Jean-Jacques Rousseau's concept of a noble savage. He stands barefoot, alone in a rural Arcadian landscape with unusual palm-like trees. Reynolds invokes a sense of receding space as Mai moves across the landscape, making a patrician gesture.

He is wearing flowing "oriental" white robes resembling a version of ceremonial Tahitian dress, associated with Tahitian nobility and the priestly classes. The sash around his waist is in a different pigment - slightly creamier compared to the tunic he's wearing, with light red edging. The cloth material is perhaps intended to be tapa cloth, a bark cloth associated with the different islands in Polynesia.

His adlocutio pose was inspired by the Apollo Belvedere; Reynolds first used the pose in 1752, after visiting Rome, in a portrait of Commodore Augustus Keppel. The pose emphasizes the ritual tattoos on his hands, while also making classical allusions. Tattoos were seen in the South Pacific, particularly in the Māori groups, and were customary for coming of age rites for the worship of a local god called ʻOro. It is considered the first portrait of a person of colour "painted with dignity, grandeur, and agency".

The work measures 90 × 57 inches (230 × 140 cm). It was painted in around 1775, and was one of 12 portraits exhibited by Reynolds at the Royal Academy's eighth exhibition in 1776, to great acclaim. It was praised as a good likeness of the subject. The other paintings exhibited by Reynolds in 1776 included a full-length portrait of Georgiana, Duchess of Devonshire in a similarly idyllic setting.

A pencil preparatory sketch is held by the National Library of Australia as part of the Rex Nan Kivell Collection, and Yale University Art Gallery has an oval oil sketch. The painting was reproduced as a mezzotint by Johann Jacobé, published by John Boydell in 1780.

== History ==
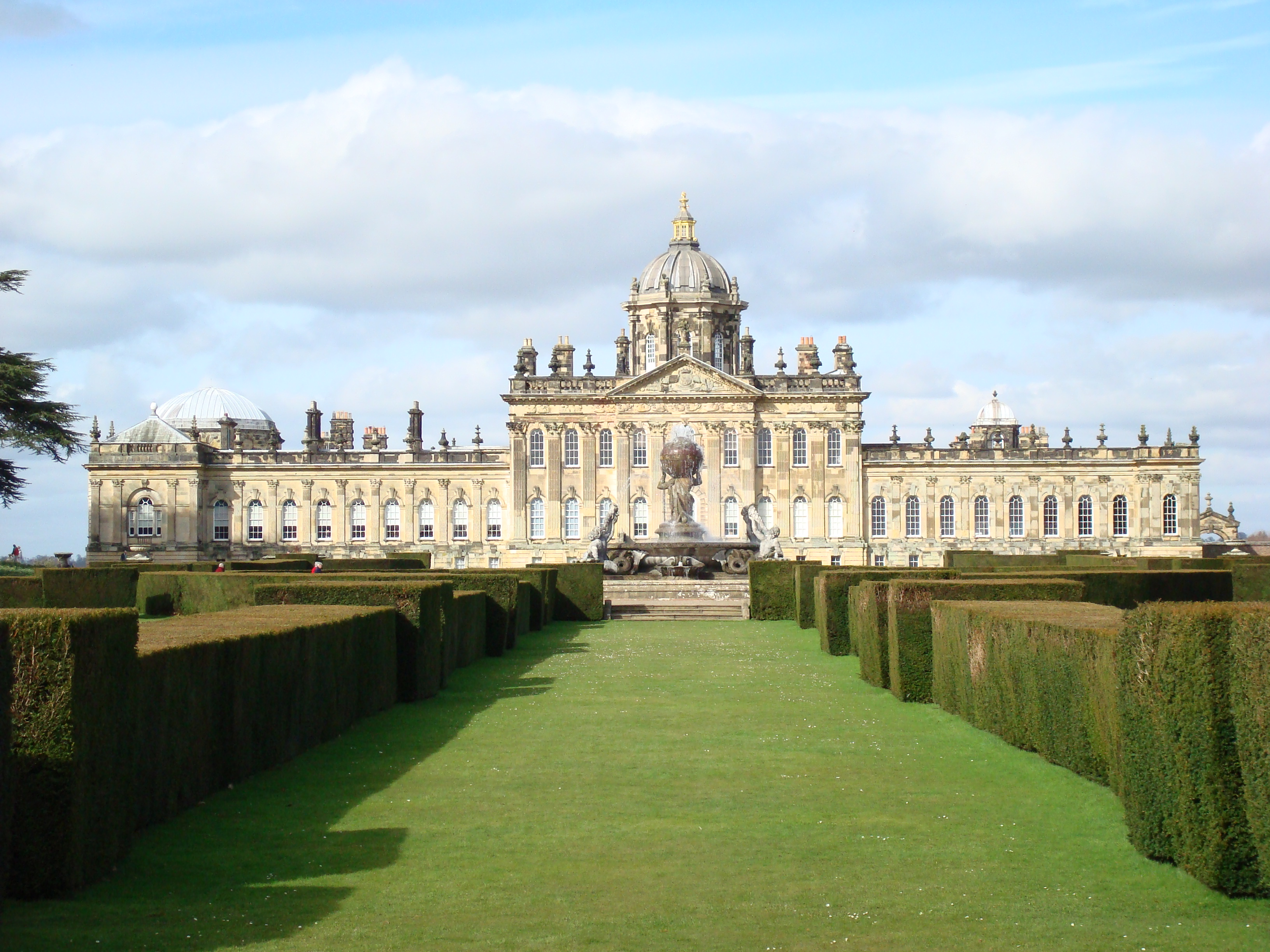
Castle Howard, the portrait's home for 200 years.

Reynolds was not commissioned to paint Mai's portrait, and the work remained in his studio until his death in 1792. It was auctioned by Greenwood's in April 1796, and acquired by the art dealer Michael Bryan for 100 guineas. Bryan sold it to art collector Frederick Howard, 5th Earl of Carlisle, and it was displayed in the Reynolds Room at Castle Howard for 200 years. It was not seen again at a public exhibition until it appeared at the Royal Academy in 1954.

=== Sale by the Howards ===
The painting was included in the estate of George Howard, Baron Howard of Henderskelfe when he died in November 1984. It was put on sale by his son, Simon Howard, to meet the costs of a divorce and to help with the running costs of the Castle Howard estate. Howard offered to sell the work to the Tate Gallery, but its suggested price of £5.5 million was rejected. Auctioned at Sotheby's in September 2001, the painting was bought by London art dealer Guy Morrison. The Antiques Trade Gazette suggested that Morrison had been subject to "auction fever", i.e. getting carried away and bidding more than his private client had authorized him to. The total sale price of £10.3 million (after fees and commission) was a record for a work by Reynolds and, at the time, the second highest amount paid for a painting by a British artist: the then record being set in 1990 of £10.7 million for John Constable's The Lock, this has since been substantially surpassed, including by further sale of The Lock in 2012 (£22.4 million).

=== Magnier acquisition ===
The painting was eventually acquired by Irish businessman John Magnier. In 2002, he applied to export the work but was refused an export licence by the Reviewing Committee on the Export of Works of Art while the Tate Gallery sought funding to acquire the work for its stated value of £12.5 million. The Gallery launched a campaign, supported by David Attenborough, to acquire the work. An anonymous donor offered to purchase it from Magnier and loan it to the gallery, but Magnier refused to sell. In the meantime he also refused to allow the painting to be displayed in public in the UK.

The painting remained in storage at Christie's until 2005 when it was included in a Reynolds exhibition at Tate Britain in 2005. The British government continued to refuse a permanent export licence, but a temporary export licence was granted in 2005 for 6½ years, and the painting went on display at the National Gallery of Ireland. In 2011, this licence was extended, but a further application for a second temporary export licence was refused in 2012, and the painting returned to the UK. It was briefly exhibited at a Reynolds exhibition at the Rijksmuseum in Amsterdam in 2018.

In 2014, the painting was the subject of a ruling by the Court of Appeal in a case bought by the custodians of Castle Howard against HM Revenue and Customs as its taxable status. The Court found in favour of the custodians, and against HMRC, upholding an earlier decision of the Upper Tribunal, and overturning the first instance decision of the First-tier Tribunal. The Court held that as the portrait had been displayed in a part of Castle Howard that was open to the public, it fell within the definition of "plant". As a result, it could be considered a "wasting asset" and so any proceeds of sale were exempt from capital gains tax. This tax loophole was closed by changes to taxation outlined in the 2015 Budget. An application to the Supreme Court for permission appeal was rejected in January 2015.

=== Acquisition by the National Portrait Gallery and the Getty Museum ===
In 2022 the portrait, now valued at £50 million, was at risk of leaving the UK once again and was again placed under a 12 month export bar. The rationale for the new valuation was unclear, being nearly five times the previous valuation of £10.7 million, and being untested at auction since. However, as the broadcaster and art dealer Philip Mould noted, such a valuation could be justified against a declining market in eighteenth century art thanks to the unusual diversity of the painting's subject; saying "it is hard to put a price on such a rare full-length portrait of a man of colour." Mould's brother, also an expert in British Old Masters, had been responsible for the new £50 million valuation.

The National Portrait Gallery (NPG) organized a funding campaign to purchase the painting, receiving backing from the Art Fund (£2.5 million – the largest single contribution the Fund had made in its 120 year existence), National Heritage Memorial Fund (NHMF) (£10 million), and over 1400 private donors. In an effort to secure more funding, the Gallery began discussions with the Getty Museum in Los Angeles for the possibility of a joint acquisition, with the painting being shared between the institutions. However, such an agreement could complicate promises of funding from the NHMF, who had allocated money on the basis of a sole UK purchase.

An open letter from leading academics in the field was published in the Financial Times in June 2022 in support of the retention of the portrait in the UK. This was followed by a similarly supportive column in The Guardian by the author and historian, and NPG trustee, Simon Sebag Montefiore in March 2023.

In March 2023, the export bar expired, with only about half the necessary funding secured, and negotiations with the Getty ongoing. It was then extended by three months, to June 2023, to allow negotiations between the NPG and the Getty to continue. The director of the NPG had approached the UK Government for a direct Treasury grant without success, however, the new chair of the NHMF signalled their support for continued efforts to maintain public access to the painting, even if it required a novel resolution.

On 31 March 2023, the NPG and the Getty announced a plan "to jointly acquire and share ownership" of the portrait, in "a new model of international collaboration". UK Arts Minister Stephen Parkinson, Baron Parkinson of Whitley Bay, said that the two museums are "closing in on finalising a deal" with the NPG still needing to raise under £1 million and the final technical intricacies of the deal to be ironed out.

On 25 April 2023, the two galleries confirmed their successful acquisition of the portrait which was renamed Portrait of Mai (Omai), to reflect the true name of the subject.

Possession of the portrait is expected to alternate between the NPG in London and the Getty in Los Angeles; the NPG made it the centrepiece of its post-refurbishment reopening in June 2023. In October 2025 the portrait travelled to the Fitzwilliam Museum, Cambridge, the second stage of a public programme and national tour called Journeys with Mai. It had first been exhibited from May to August 2025 at Cartwright Hall, Bradford and the third loan exhibition will be in 2026 at The Box, Plymouth.

The portrait will be displayed at the Getty for the first time in 2026 with the portrait exhibited in Los Angeles while the city hosts the 2028 Olympic Games.

== Gallery ==
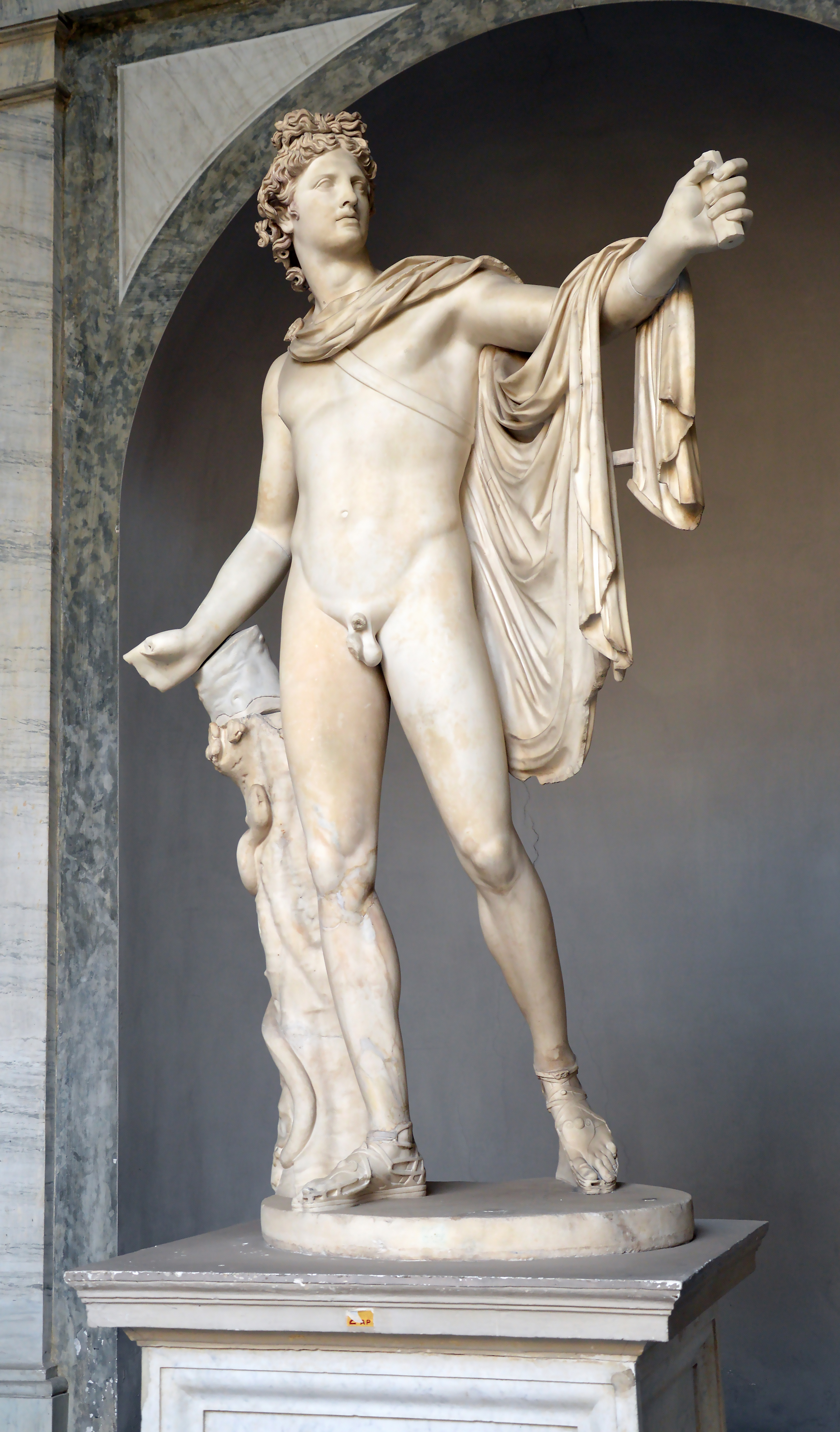
Apollo Belvedere, c. 120–140

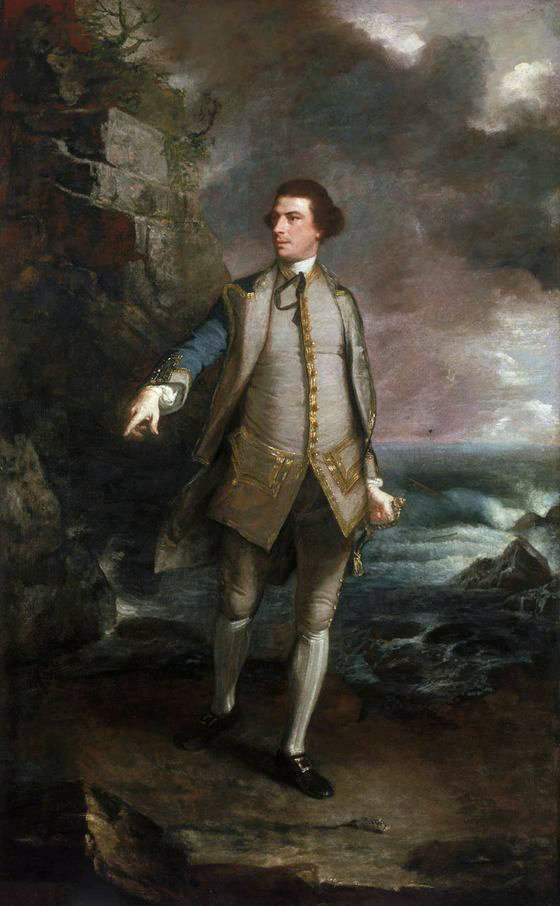
Sir Joshua Reynolds, Captain the Honourable Augustus Keppel, 1752–53, National Maritime Museum, Greenwich

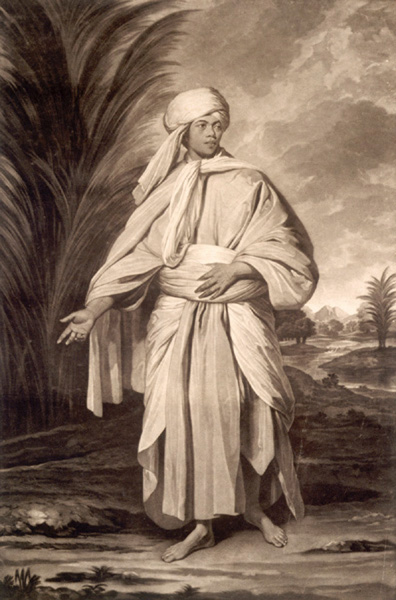
Johann Jacobé, mezzotint after Reynolds, Omai, a Native of the Island of Utietea, 1780

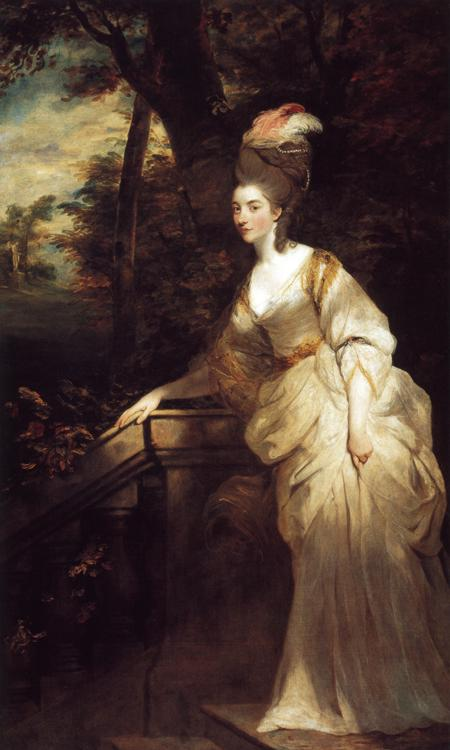
Sir Joshua Reynolds, Georgiana, Duchess of Devonshire, c.1775, Huntington Museum

Sir Joshua Reynolds Portrait of Philip Gell, full-length, in a purple embroidered French frock suit, holding a gun, a spaniel at his feet, in a landscape (94 x 58 in. / 238.7 x 147.3 cm)

== See also ==
- Pendant portraits of Maerten Soolmans and Oopjen Coppit – a matching pair of 1634 portraits by Rembrandt owned by the Rothschild family, acquired jointly by the Louvre Museum and the Rijksmuseum in 2015 for $160 million, .
- The Clock – a 2010 digital artwork by Christian Marclay, copies of which have been acquired (in some cases jointly) by various leading institutions including Tate Modern, the Centre Pompidou, and the National Gallery of Canada.
- Wang-y-tong – a Chinese visitor to late eighteenth century Britain, also painted by Reynolds
