= André-Robert Andréa de Nerciat =

French writer (1739–1800)

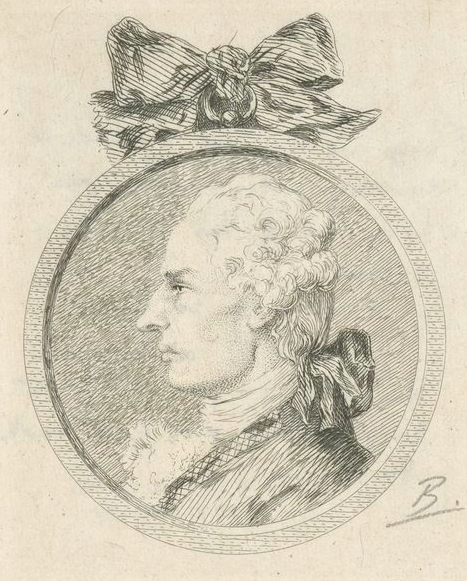
Andréa de Nerciat by Félix Bracquemond

André-Robert Andréa de Nerciat (17 April 1739 – 1800) was a French novelist, best known for his novel Le Diable au corps.

Nerciat was born at Dijon, the son of a royal official in Burgundy. He retired from the military in 1775 and worked as a writer of plays, verse, light music and pornographic novels, while also serving as a secret agent of the French government across Europe. He may also have worked as a double agent, as he was arrested by the French when they invaded Naples in 1798.
