= The Castle of Andalusia =

1782 comic opera

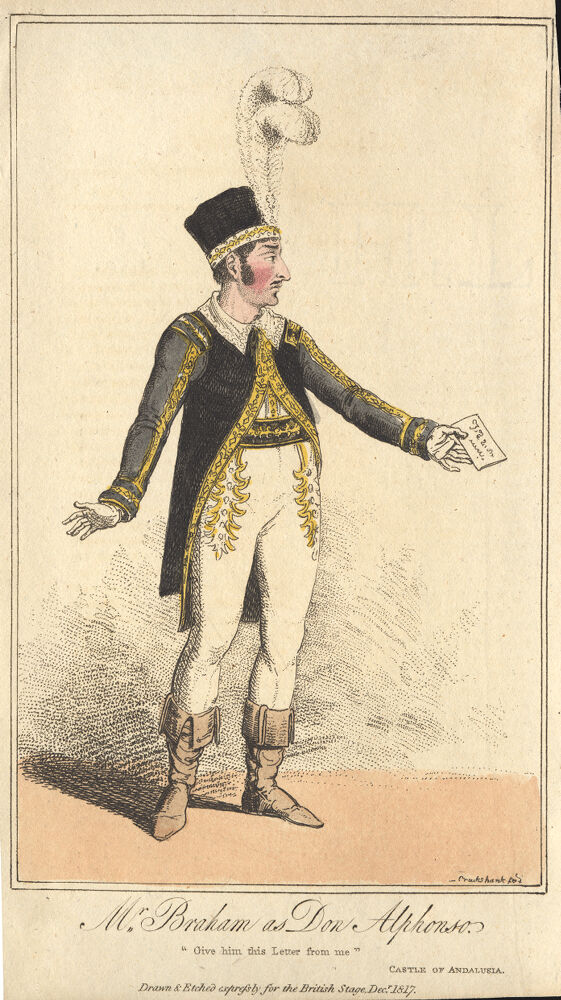
- John Braham as Don Alphonso, 1817
- Original language: English
- Written by: John O'Keeffe
- Genre: Comedy

Premiere
- Date: 2 November 1782
- Place: Covent Garden Theatre

The Castle of Andalusia is a 1782 comic opera by Samuel Arnold and a libretto by John O'Keeffe. It was a heavily rewritten version of the 1781 work The Banditti, which had been a failure.

After its first performance on 2 November 1782, the original run saw the work performed thirty-nine times, and it was revived on several occasions until 1817. It became a popular play for amateur dramatics and was performed by the Kilkenny players, including many of the elite, with the writer Thomas Moore appearing several times in the role of Spado.

== Bibliography ==
- Fenner, Theodore: Opera in London: Views of the Press, 1785-1830 (Carbondale, Illinois: Southern Illinois University Press, 1994)
- Kelly, Ronan: Bard of Erin: The Life of Thomas Moore (London: Penguin Books, 2009)
- White, Eric Walter: A Register of First Performances of English Operas (London: Society for Theatre Research, 1983)
