= Love in a Camp =

1786 British opera

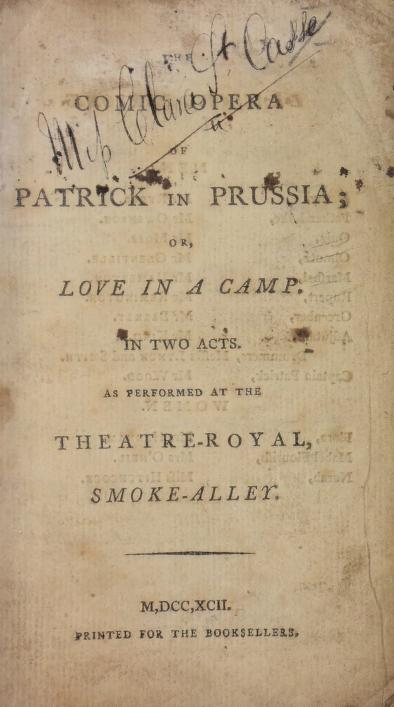
- 1792 version as performed at the Theatre Royal, Dublin.
- Written by: John O'Keeffe
- Original language: English
- Genre: Comedy

Premiere
- Date premiered: 17 February 1786
- Place premiered: Covent Garden Theatre

Patrick in Prussia, or Love in a Camp is a 1786 comic opera with music by William Shield and a libretto by John O'Keeffe. An afterpiece, it was a sequel to the 1783 hit The Poor Soldier with the characters now serving in the Prussian army.

The work in two acts was first performed on 17 February 1786 at the Covent Garden opera house, London.

== Bibliography ==
- Shaffer, Jason: Performing Patriotism: National Identity in the Colonial and Revolutionary American Theater (Philadelphia: University of Pennsylvania Press, 2007)
- White, Eric Walter: A Register of First Performances of English Operas (London: Society for Theatre Research, 1983)
