= The Farmer (opera) =

- Original language: English
- Written by: John O'Keeffe
- Genre: Comedy

Premiere
- Date: 31 October 1787
- Place: Covent Garden Theatre

The Farmer is a two-act comic opera with music by William Shield and a libretto by the Irish writer John O'Keeffe, set in London and Kent and premiered at the Theatre Royal Covent Garden on 31 October 1787.

O'Keeffe adapted the text from his play The Plague of Riches, which had been rejected. Its songs included "A Flaxen-Headed Cow-Boy".

== Sources ==
- http://www.oxforddnb.com/view/article/20658
