= The Siege of Curzola =

1786 comic opera

- Original language: English
- Written by: John O'Keeffe
- Genre: Comedy

Premiere
- Date: 12 August 1786
- Place: Haymarket Theatre

The Siege of Curzola is a 1786 comic opera with music by Samuel Arnold and a libretto by the Irish writer John O'Keeffe. It is set in 1571 during the Ottoman siege of Curzola at the time of the Battle of Lepanto.

It was staged at the Haymarket Theatre in London. The original cast included John Edwin, John Bannister and Lydia Webb. In following years it was reduced to a shorter two-act afterpiece.

== Bibliography ==
- Worrall, David. Celebrity, Performance, Reception: British Georgian Theatre as Social Assemblage. Cambridge University Press, 2013.
