= John O'Keeffe (writer) =

Irish actor and dramatist

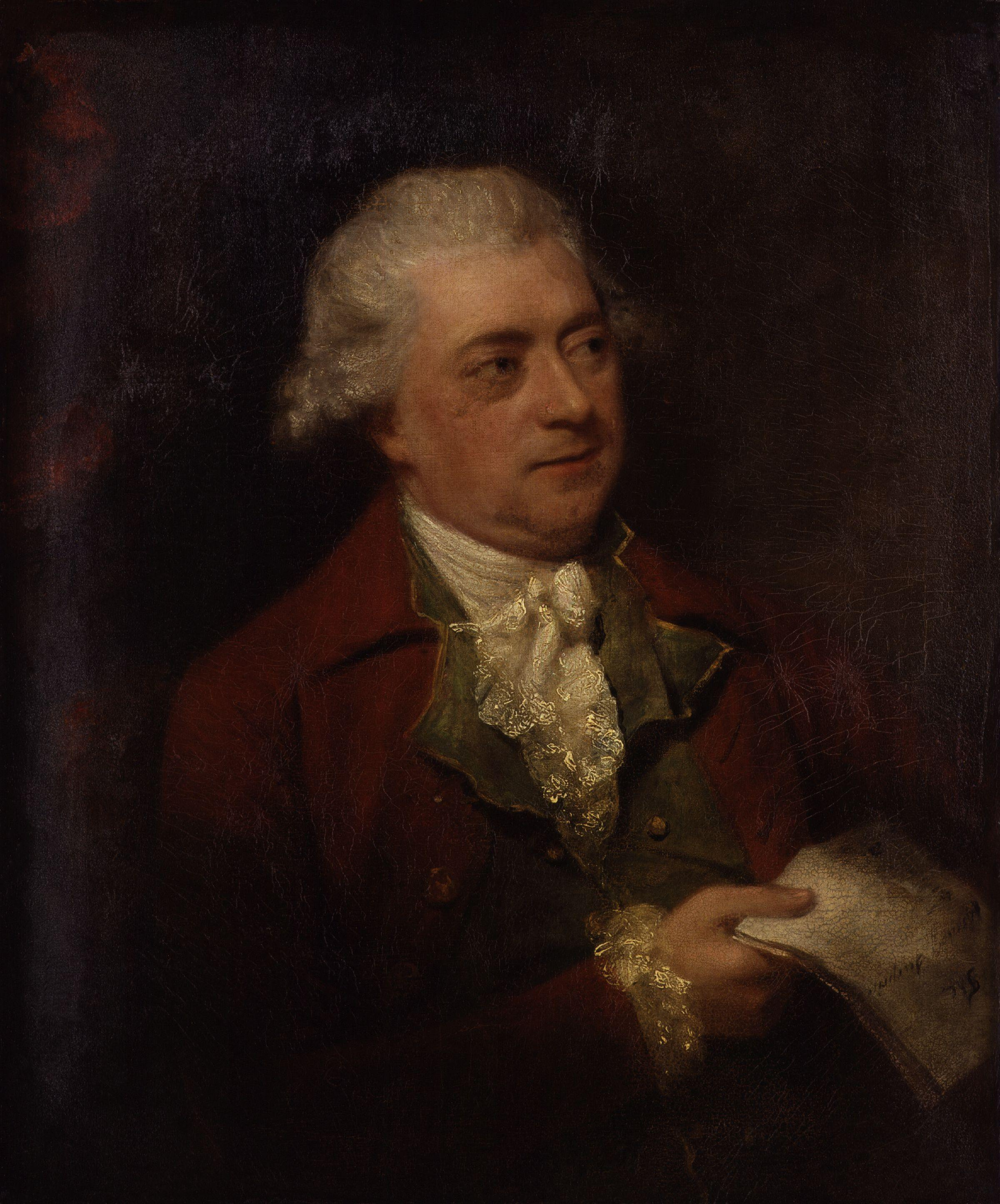
- Portrait of John O'Keeffe by either Thomas or William Lawranson, 1782
- Born: 24 June 1747; Dublin, Ireland
- Died: 4 February 1833 (aged 85); Southampton, Hampshire, England
- Spouse: Mary Heaphy

John O'Keeffe (24 June 1747 – 4 February 1833) was an Irish actor and dramatist. He wrote a number of farces, amusing dramatic pieces and librettos for pasticcio operas, many of which had great success. Among these are Tony Lumpkin in Town (1778), Love in a Camp (1786), and Omai (1785), an account of the voyages of the Tahitian explorer Omai, and Wild Oats (1791).

== Early life ==
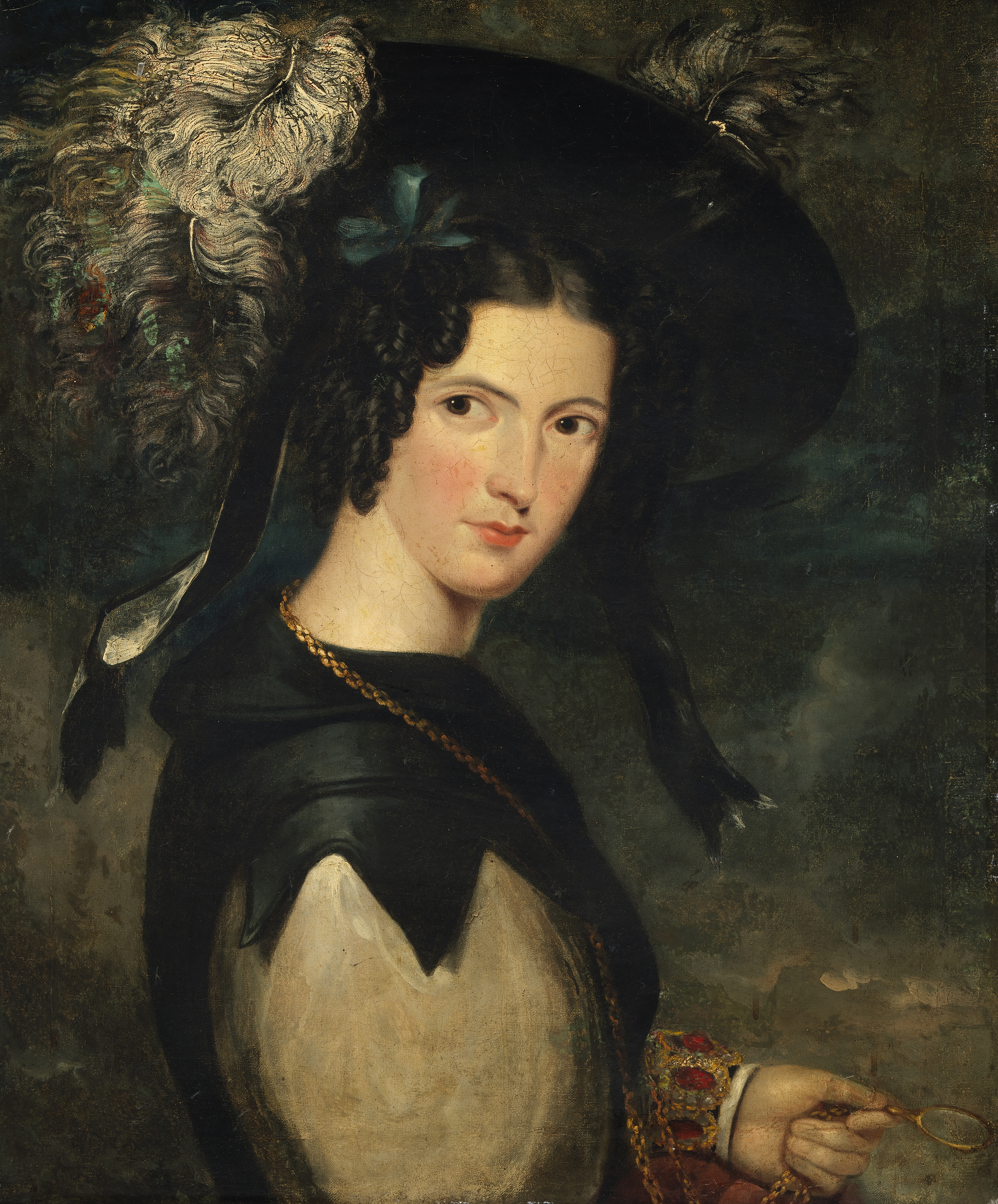
Portrait of Mrs John O' Keefe, Wife of the Artist held in the National Gallery of Ireland, attributed to O'Keeffe

O'Keeffe was born in Abbey Street, Dublin in 1747 to Roman Catholic parents and was educated by the Jesuits. His father was from King's County and his mother (née O'Connor) from County Wexford. After showing a talent for drawing he studied art at an academy in Dublin, but grew increasingly more interested in the theatre. After a two-year period in London, where he became an admirer of David Garrick, he settled on a career as an actor and playwright. O'Keeffe wrote his first play The She Gallant when he was twenty, and it was performed in Dublin at the Smock Alley Theatre. In Cork, in late September 1774, O'Keeffe married Mary Heaphy, a Protestant actress and the daughter of Tottenham Heaphy, manager of the Dublin Theatre Royal. The marriage ended badly when O'Keeffe discovered that she was having an affair with the Scottish actor George Graham. O'Keeffe left Ireland with their children, and Mary was denied access to her son and daughter, John Tottenham O'Keeffe and Adelaide O'Keeffe. Mary Heaphy, according to Adelaide O'Keeffe's memoir of her father, married Graham without first divorcing her husband. She did not consider her marriage to the Catholic John O'Keeffe to be sufficiently binding.

== Success ==
In 1777, O'Keeffe moved to London. The following year he wrote Tony Lumpkin in Town, a sequel to Oliver Goldsmith's She Stoops to Conquer, and sent it to the manager of the Haymarket Theatre. The play was successfully produced, and O'Keeffe regularly wrote for the Haymarket thereafter. In 1782, O'Keeffe had his two children sent abroad to France to prevent their mother's access to them. His son did well but his daughter suffered in convent schools.

Between 1782 and 1796, O'Keeffe wrote around 28 plays and librettos for comic operas. The Poor Soldier (1783), a comic opera with libretto by O'Keeffe and music by William Shield, was a farce about the lives of British soldiers returning home after the American War of Independence. O'Keeffe also wrote The Son-in-Law, Agreeable Surprise (which includes the lyrical poem Amo, Amas), and The Castle of Andalusia.

O'Keeffe had problems with his eyes ever since he had fallen into the River Liffey in his youth. From the mid-1770s, O'Keeffe increasingly lost his sight, and from 1781 his plays had to be dictated by him. In spite of this, he was a prolific writer and was the most-frequently produced playwright in London in the last quarter of the 18th century. O'Keeffe contributed many Irish folksongs to the musical scores by Samuel Arnold and Shield such as I am a Friar of Orders Grey and The Thorn are still popular. For many of these songs, the comic operas are the earliest source. From 1788, his only daughter Adelaide became his amanuensis and eventual caretaker until his death. Adelaide O'Keeffe was a popular novelist and an important children's poet who authored the first children's novel in verse, A Trip to the Coast (1819).

In 1800, a benefit performance was staged for him at Covent Garden. In 1826, O'Keeffe wrote his memoirs, which covered his life experiences and various interactions with the leading artistic figures of his day. The memoirs were dictated to his daughter Adelaide who oversaw their publication. The same year he was awarded a pension by George IV. However, much of the information in his memoir is not accurate. In the year following his death, Adelaide O'Keeffe completed her own memoir of her father; "Memoir" prefaced her edited collection of his poetry, O'Keeffe's Legacy to His Daughter, Being the Poetic Works of the Late John O'Keeffe, Esq., the Dramatic Author. He died in 1833 in Southampton and was buried there.

== Legacy ==
In the 19th century, the essayist William Hazlitt described O'Keeffe as the "English Molière", observing "in light, careless laughter and pleasant exaggeration of the humorous, we have no equal to him". His Wild Oats has been revived in 1976, 1995 and 2012 by the Royal Shakespeare Company, the Royal National Theatre and the Bristol Old Vic respectively.

== Selected works ==
- The Dutchman Outwitted (1767)
- The She Gallent (1767)
- The Giant's Causeway (1770)
- The Shamrock (1777)
- Tony Lumpkin in Town (1778)
- The Son-in-Law (1779)
- The Banditti (1781)
- The Agreeable Surprise (1781)
- The Castle of Andalusia (1782)
- Harlequin Teague (1782)
- The Lord Mayor's Day (1782)
- The Dead Alive (1783)
- The Poor Soldier (1783)
- The Young Quaker (1784)
- Peeping Tom (1784)
- Omai (1785)
- The Blacksmith of Antwerp (1785)
- Love in a Camp (1786)
- The Siege of Curzola (1786)
- The Farmer (1787)
- The Prisoner at Large (1788)
- The Toy (1789)
- Wild Oats (1791)
- The London Hermit (1793)
- The World in a Village (1793)
- Life's Vagaries (1795)
- The Wicklow Mountains (1795)
- The Doldrum (1796)

== Bibliography ==
- Baines, Paul & Ferraro, Julian & Rogers, Pat: The Wiley-Blackwell Encyclopedia of Eighteenth Century Writers and Writing: 1660-1789 (Hoboken, New Jersey: Wiley-Blackwell, 2011)
- Boydell, Brian: "O'Keeffe, John", in: Die Musik in Geschichte und Gegenwart (MGG), biographical part, vol. 15 (Kassel: Bärenreiter, 2006), cc. 702–3
- Fleischmann, Aloys (ed.): Sources of Irish Traditional Music c.1600–1855 (New York: Garland, 1998)
- Hager, Alan: Encyclopedia of British Writers: 16th, 17th & 18th Centuries (New York: Book Builders, 2005)
- Klein, Axel: "Stage-Irish, or The National in Irish Opera, 1780–1925", in: Opera Quarterly vol. 21 (2005) no. 1, p. 27–67.
