= Dorothea Banks =

English china collector (1758–1828)

Lady Banks
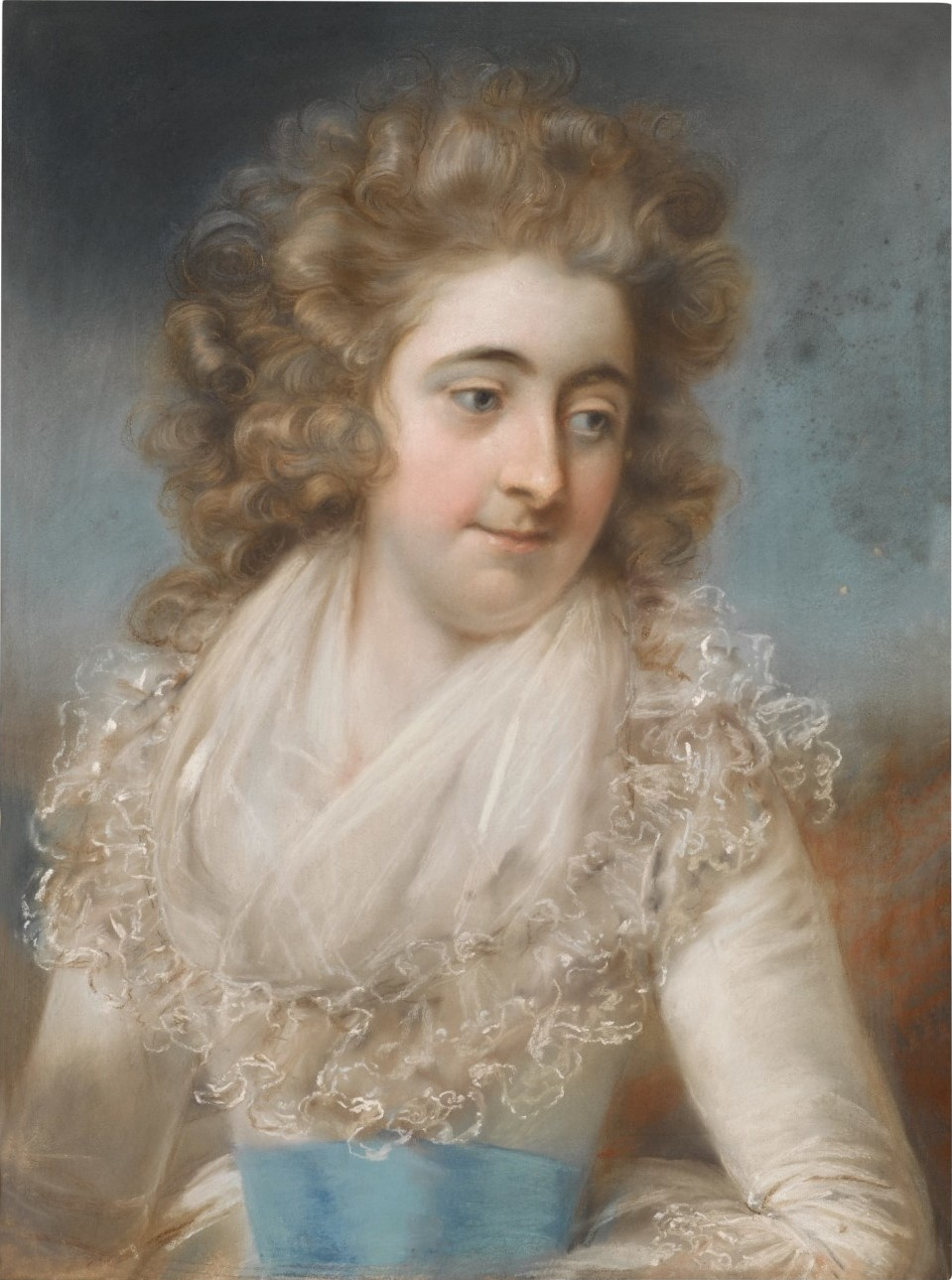
- Lady Banks painted by John Russell
- Born: Dorothea Hugessen; 8 November 1758
- Died: 1828 (aged 69–70)
- Spouse: Sir Joseph Banks, 1st Baronet
- Parent(s): William Western Hugessen; Thomazine Honywood

Dorothea Banks, Lady Banks (née Hugessen, 8 November 1758 – 1828) was an English heiress and collector of ceramics. Her collection of ceramics, which she displayed in the dairy of her home at Spring Grove, is recorded in her Dairy Book. Like the ephemera collection of her sister-in-law Sarah Sophia Banks, it is informative about women collectors in the Georgian period.

== Biography ==
She was born Dorothea Hugessen on 8 November 1758, one of two daughters of William Western Hugessen of Proveden, Kent, and his wife Thomazine, née Honywood, the daughter of Sir John Honywood. She was a 'well-acred heiress' at the time of her marriage to scientist Sir Joseph Banks on 23 March 1779, and she was described by Banks' colleague Daniel Solander as 'rather handsome, very agreable, chatty & laughs a good deal.'

=== Art collection ===
Dorothea converted the dairy on their property at Spring Grove into an exhibition-house for her collection of ceramics. Banks said that she was 'a little old-china mad, but she wishes to mix as much reason with her madness as possible.' She sought authentically Eastern pieces rather than those produced for the western market, and designed a classification system for them. In 1804 King George III and his family visited her collection, and she served him produce from the dairy on some of her china.

The collection was sold at Christie’s in 1893 after the death of her great-nephew, who had inherited it, and found to contain Minton, Crown Derby, Sèvres, and Dresden ware as well as oriental pieces.

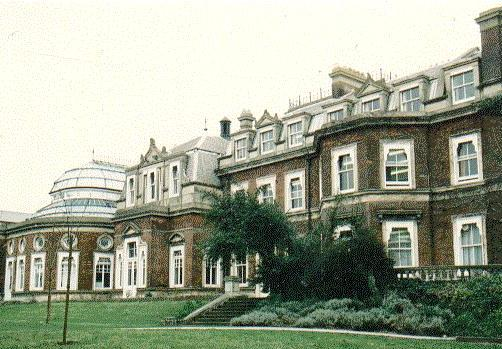
Spring Grove House, the residence of Sir Joseph and Lady Banks

Dorothea inherited the ephemera collection of her sister-in-law Sarah Sophia Banks, who lived with them, and donated it to the British Museum in her name.

== Lady Banks rose ==
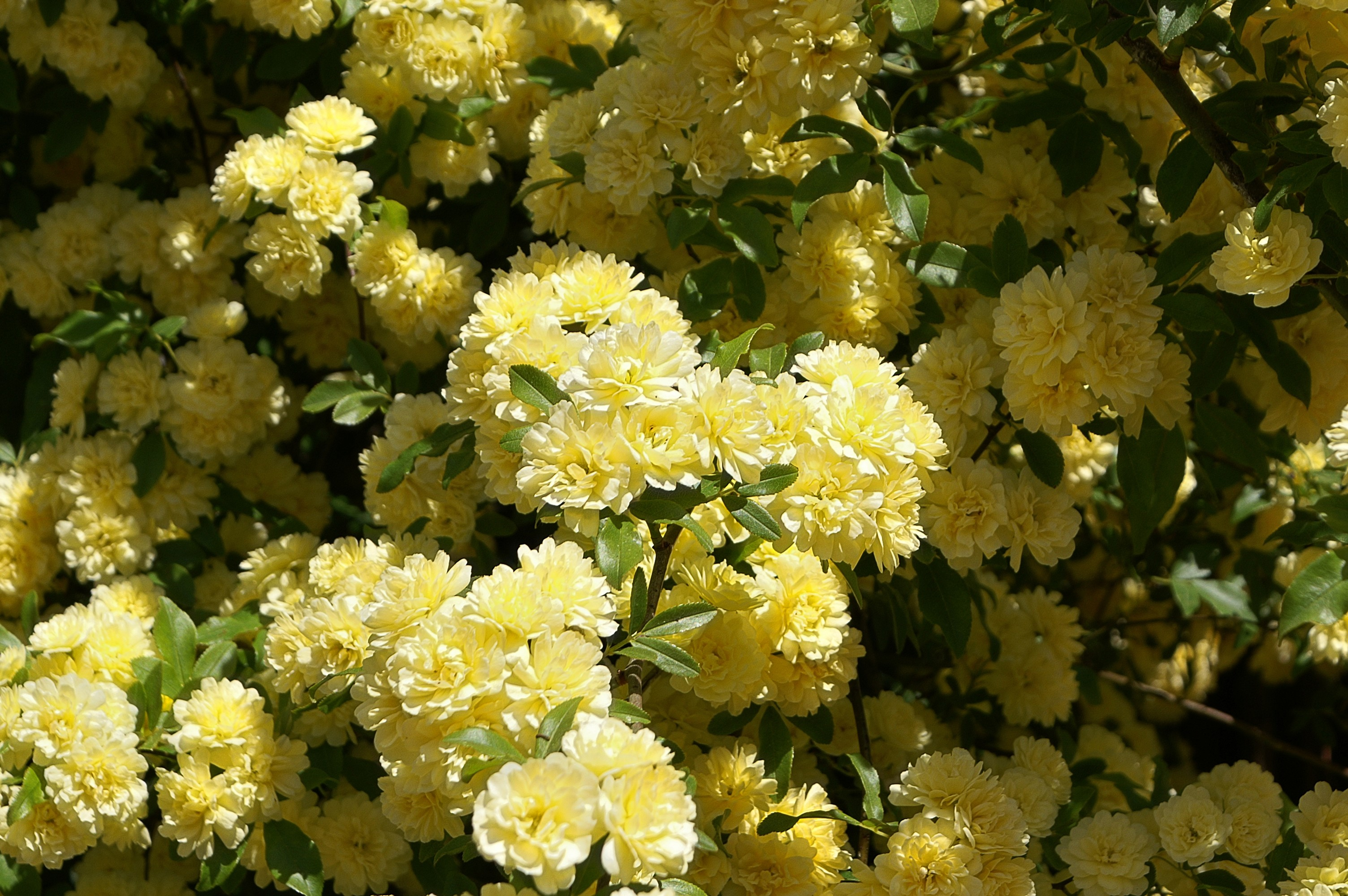
Lady Banks rose

The Lady Banks rose, brought to Kew Gardens from China by William Kerr and cultivated by her husband, was named after her.
