= William Williams (harpist) =

Welsh harpist (1759–1828)

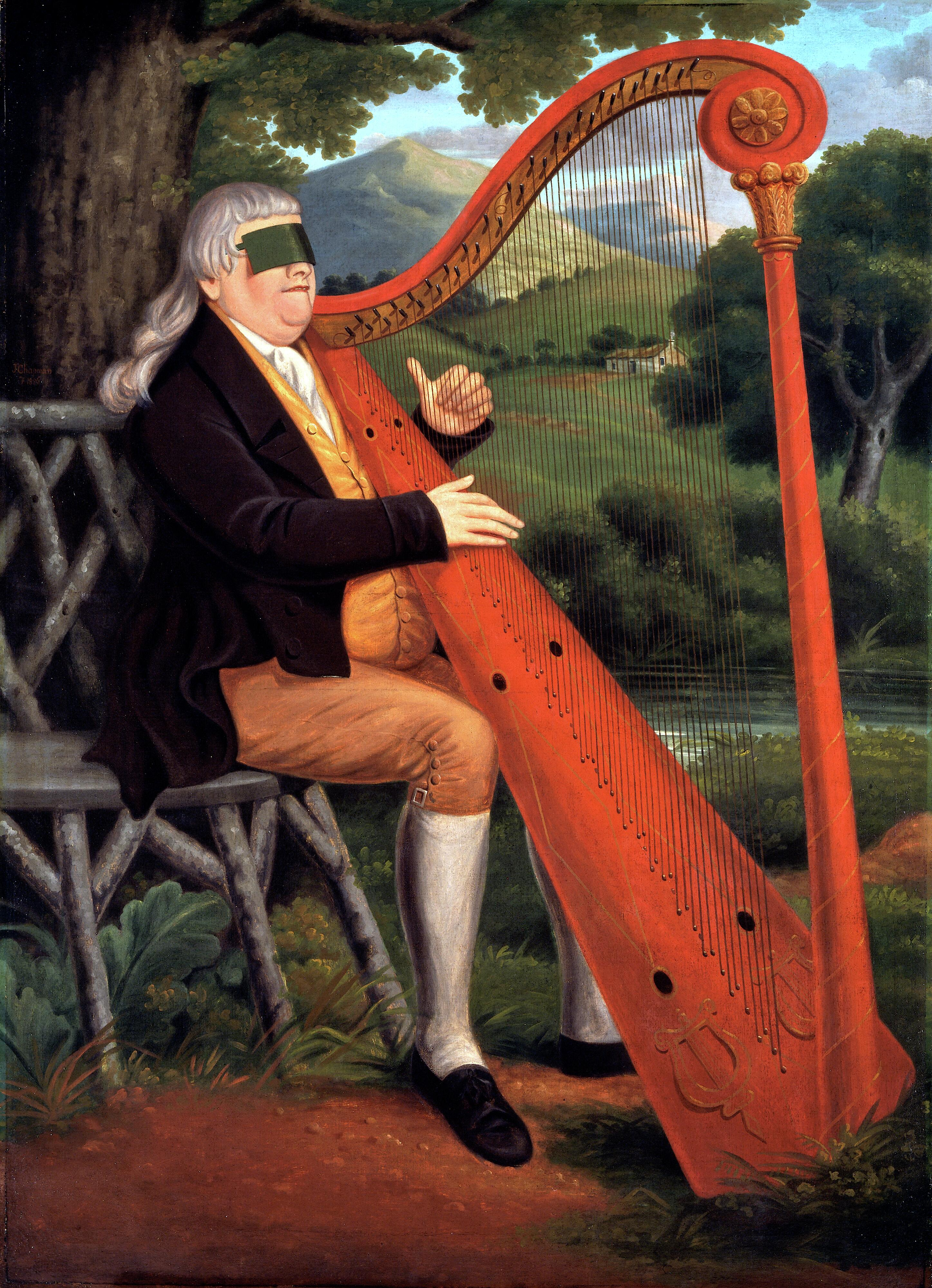
- Will Penmorfa painted by James Chapman in 1826 from the National Museum of Wales

Background information
- Born: 1759
- Origin: Tremadog, Wales
- Died: 30 November 1828 (aged 68–69) Llandeilo Fawr, Wales
- Genres: Classical; Contemporary Classical; Harp
- Occupation: Harpist

William Williams (1759 – 30 November 1828), colloquially known as Will Penmorfa, was a Welsh blind harpist from the Gwynne family of Llandeilo. He was one of the most famous harpists in Wales at the end of the 18th century and the beginning of the 19th century.

== Biography ==
Williams was born and raised in the parish of Penmorfa near Tremadog, Gwynedd. He was a pupil of the famous John Parry, the 'Blind Parry' of Rhiwabon. He was a harp teacher in turn to Richard Roberts of Caernarfon.

He attended the 1823 Carmarthen Eisteddfod where he was introduced to the historian Thomas Prince (Carnhuanawc) and he played the harp for him despite already being in his elderly years and his strength was failing. To hide his sight disability, Williams used to wear a black cloth over his eyes and had long hair halfway down his back. He spent the last part of his life as a family harpist in Plas Tregib, near Llandeilo Fawr. He died there on 30 November 1828, aged 68–69.

The oil portrait of Will Penmorfa done by an artist called James Chapman (there is uncertainty about which 'J. Chapman' this was) in 1826 is one of the iconic Welsh paintings of the 18th century.
