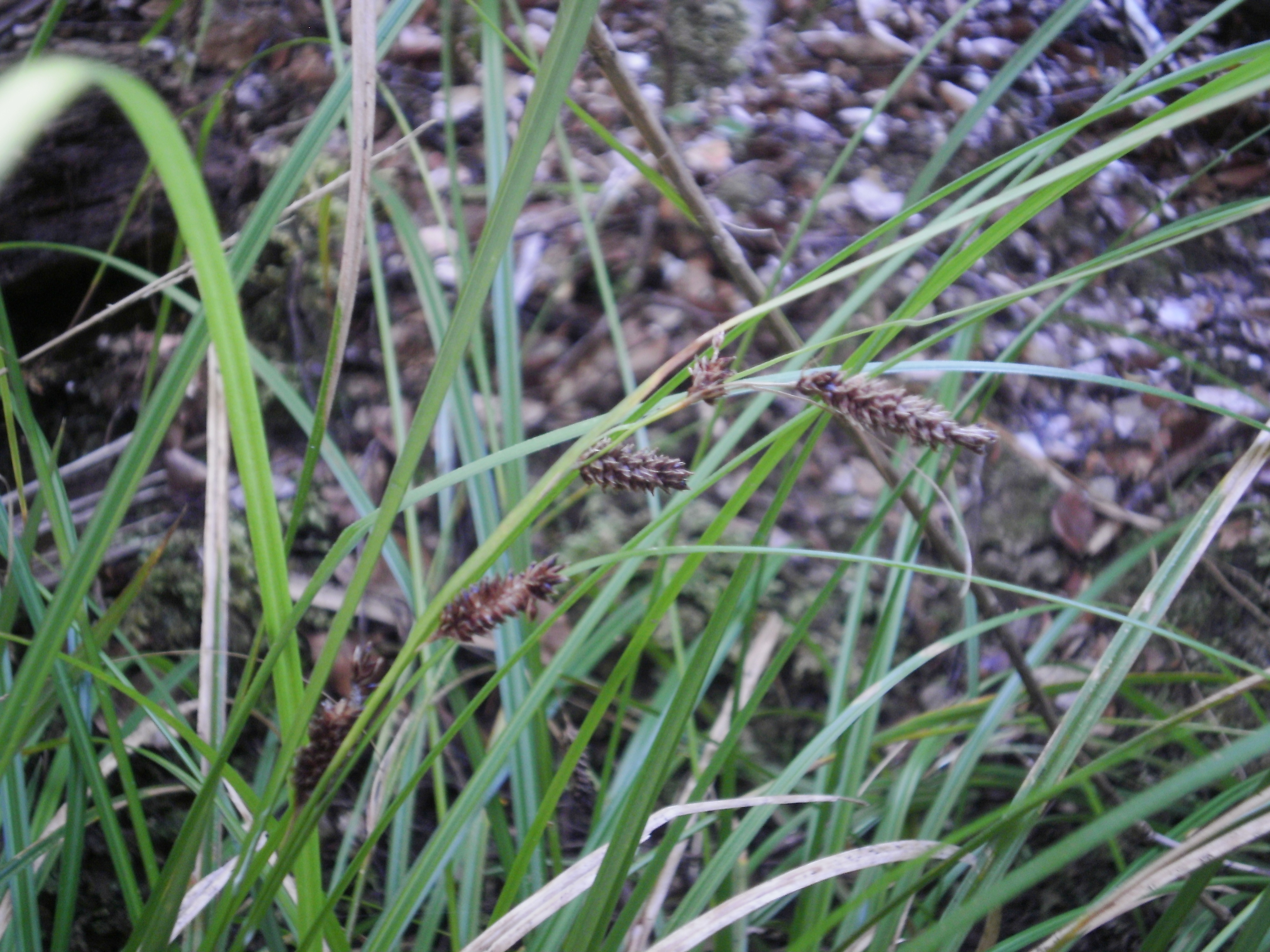

Scientific classification
- Kingdom: Plantae
- Clade: Tracheophytes
- Clade: Angiosperms
- Clade: Monocots
- Clade: Commelinids
- Order: Poales
- Family: Cyperaceae
- Genus: Carex
- Species: C. dissita

Binomial name
- Carex dissita Sol. ex Hook.f.

= Carex dissita =

Species of grass-like plant

Carex dissita, also known as purei, is a sedge that is native to New Zealand.

Carex dissita thrives in dark and damp places such as the edges of bush streams or ponds. Seeds occur on long stems in order to disperse them away from the plant.
