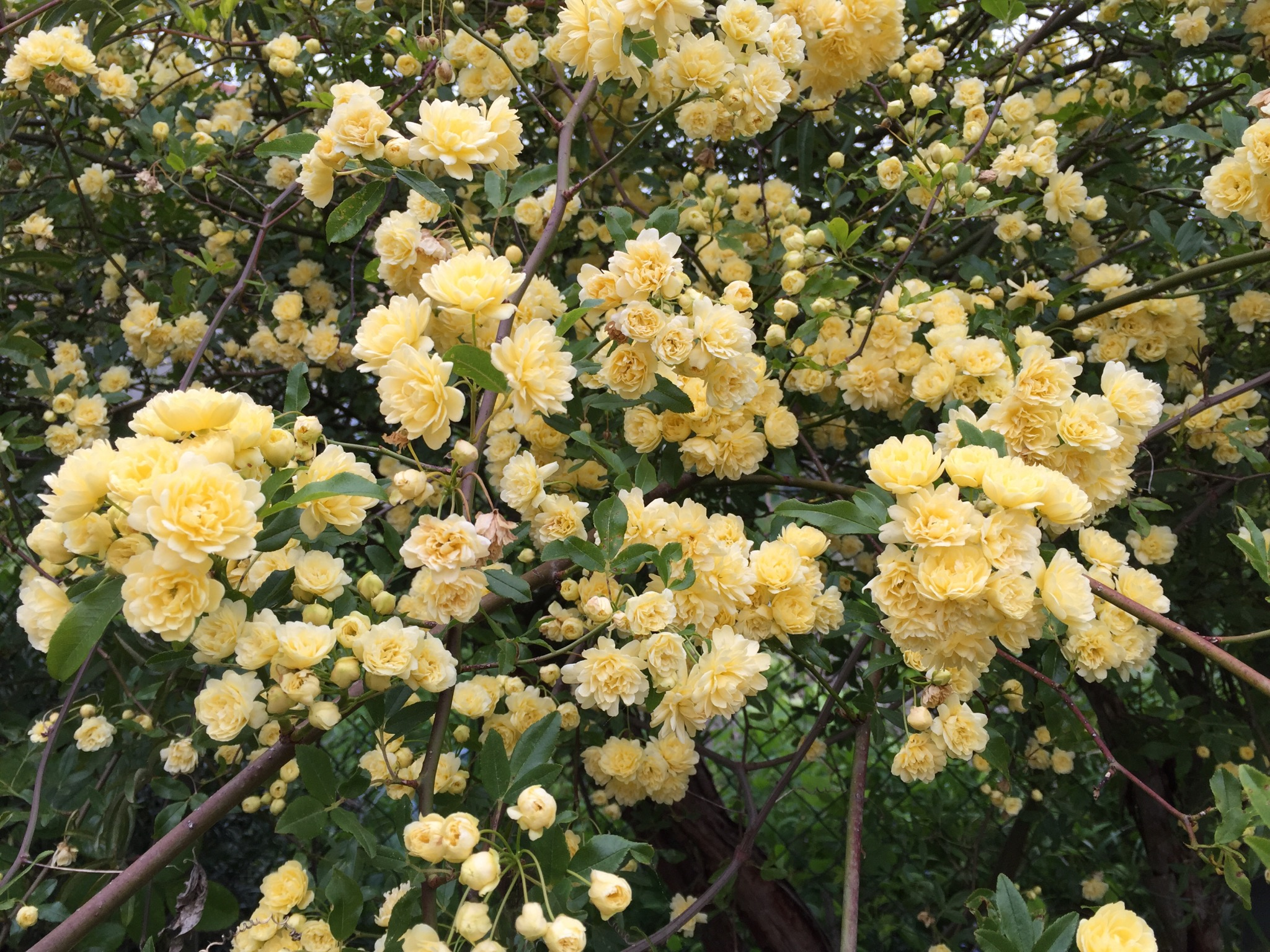

Scientific classification
- Kingdom: Plantae
- Clade: Tracheophytes
- Clade: Angiosperms
- Clade: Eudicots
- Clade: Rosids
- Order: Rosales
- Family: Rosaceae
- Genus: Rosa
- Species: R. banksiae

Binomial name
- Rosa banksiae W. T. Aiton

Synonyms
- Rosa banksiae f. aculeata Focke ex H.L‚v.; Rosa banksiae f. albiflora H.L‚v.; Rosa banksiae var. alboplena Rehder; Rosa banksiae var. banksiae; Rosa banksiae var. lutea Lindl.; Rosa banksiae f. subinermis Focke ex H.L‚v.; Rosa inermis Roxb.

= Rosa banksiae =

Species of flowering plant

Rosa banksiae, common names Banksia Rose or Lady Banks' rose, or just Banks' rose, is a species of flowering plant in the rose family, native to central and western China, in the provinces of Gansu, Guizhou, Henan, Hubei, Jiangsu, Sichuan and Yunnan, at altitudes of 500–2,200 m (1,600–7,200 ft). The rose is named for Dorothea Lady Banks, the wife of botanist Sir Joseph Banks.

== Description ==
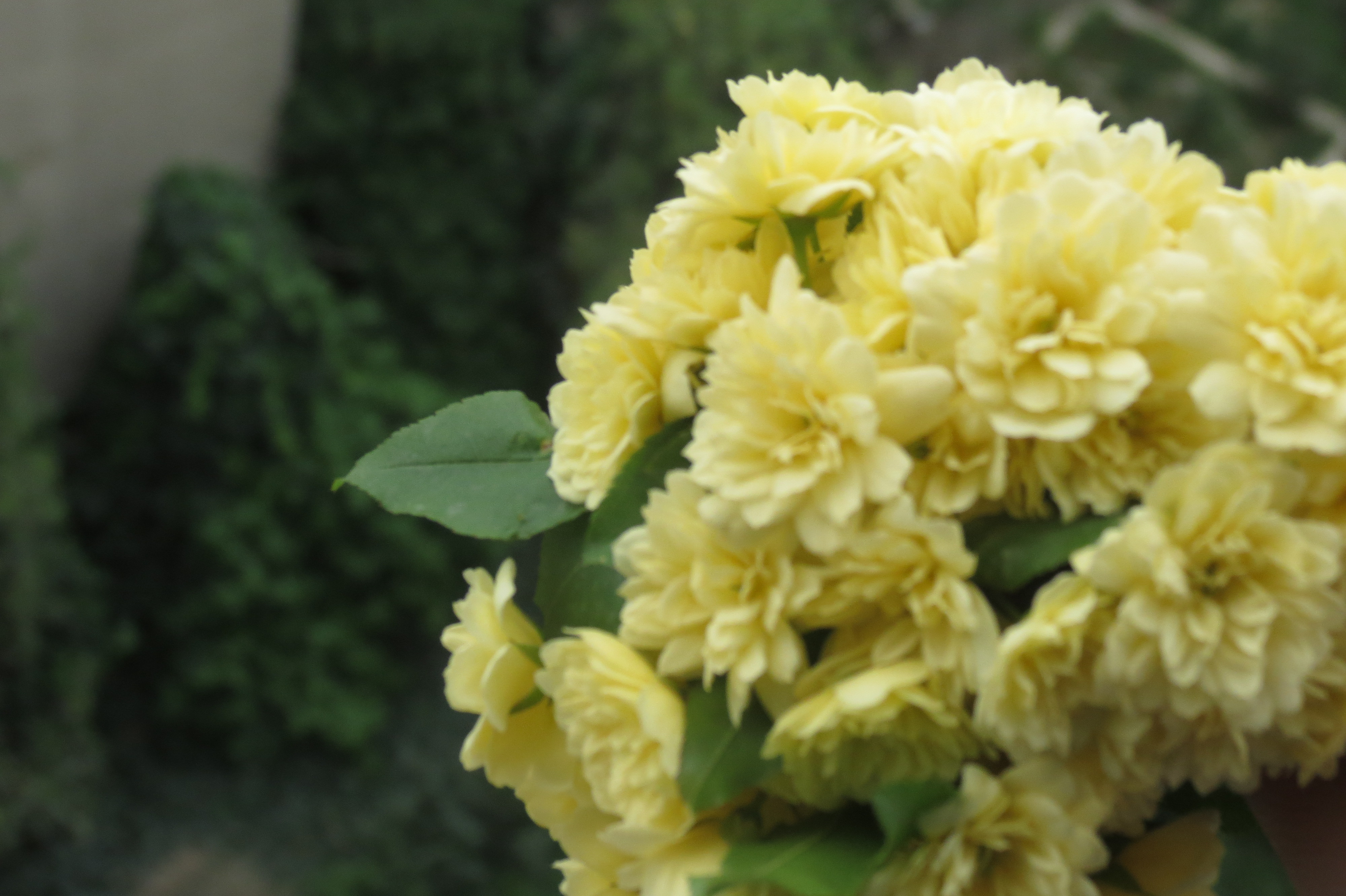
Blooming flowers

It is a scrambling shrubby vine growing vigorously to 6 m (20 ft) tall. Unlike most roses, it is practically thornless, though it may bear some prickles up to 5 mm long, particularly on stout, strong shoots. The leaves are evergreen, 4–6 cm long, with three to five (rarely seven) leaflets 2–5 cm long with a serrated margin.

The flowers are small, 1.5–2.5 cm diameter, white or pale yellow and are fragrant. It is amongst the earliest flowering of all roses, usually appearing during May in the northern hemisphere, though cold weather can delay flowering. All Lady Banks' roses are said to smell of violets to varying degrees.

== Taxonomy ==
Rosa banksiae was first described and published by W. T. Aiton in 'Hortus kew.' edition 2, Vol.3 on page 258 in 1811. Some places attribute Robert Brown as the author but it was agreed in 2018 by ICN that W. T. Aiton was the true author.

== Cultivation and uses ==
Rosa banksiae has likely been grown in the gardens of China for hundreds of years. The species was introduced to Europe by William Kerr, who had been sent on a plant-hunting expedition by Sir Joseph Banks. He bought the first Lady Banks' Rose, subsequently named the white Lady Banks (R. banksiae var. banksiae) from the famous Fa Tee nursery in 1807.

A number of other forms were subsequently discovered growing in China, including R. banksiae var. normalis (see above), and R. banksiae 'Lutea', the yellow Lady Banks' rose (brought to Europe in 1824 by J. D. Parks). In 1993 this cultivar earned the Royal Horticultural Society's Award of Garden Merit. It is used in traditional Chinese medicine, with portions of other plants and herbs (such as monkshood and Ligusticum wallichii) to make a liniment to treat a painful swelling of the joints.

An R. banksiae planted in Tombstone, Arizona in 1885 is reputedly the world's largest rose bush. It covers up to 9,000 square feet (840 m^{2}) of the roof on an inn, and has a 12-foot (3.7 m) circumference trunk.

=== Varieties ===
There were several varieties named, none of which are currently accepted. Among these are:

- Rosa banksiae var. banksiae – flowers semi-double or double, with numerous petals replacing most or all of the stamens; a cultigen developed in Chinese gardens
- Rosa banksiae var. flava
- Rosa banksiae var. inermis
- Rosa banksiae var. lutea
- Rosa banksiae var. normalis – flowers single, with five petals; said to be the natural wild form of the species
- Rosa banksiae var. plena

== Gallery ==
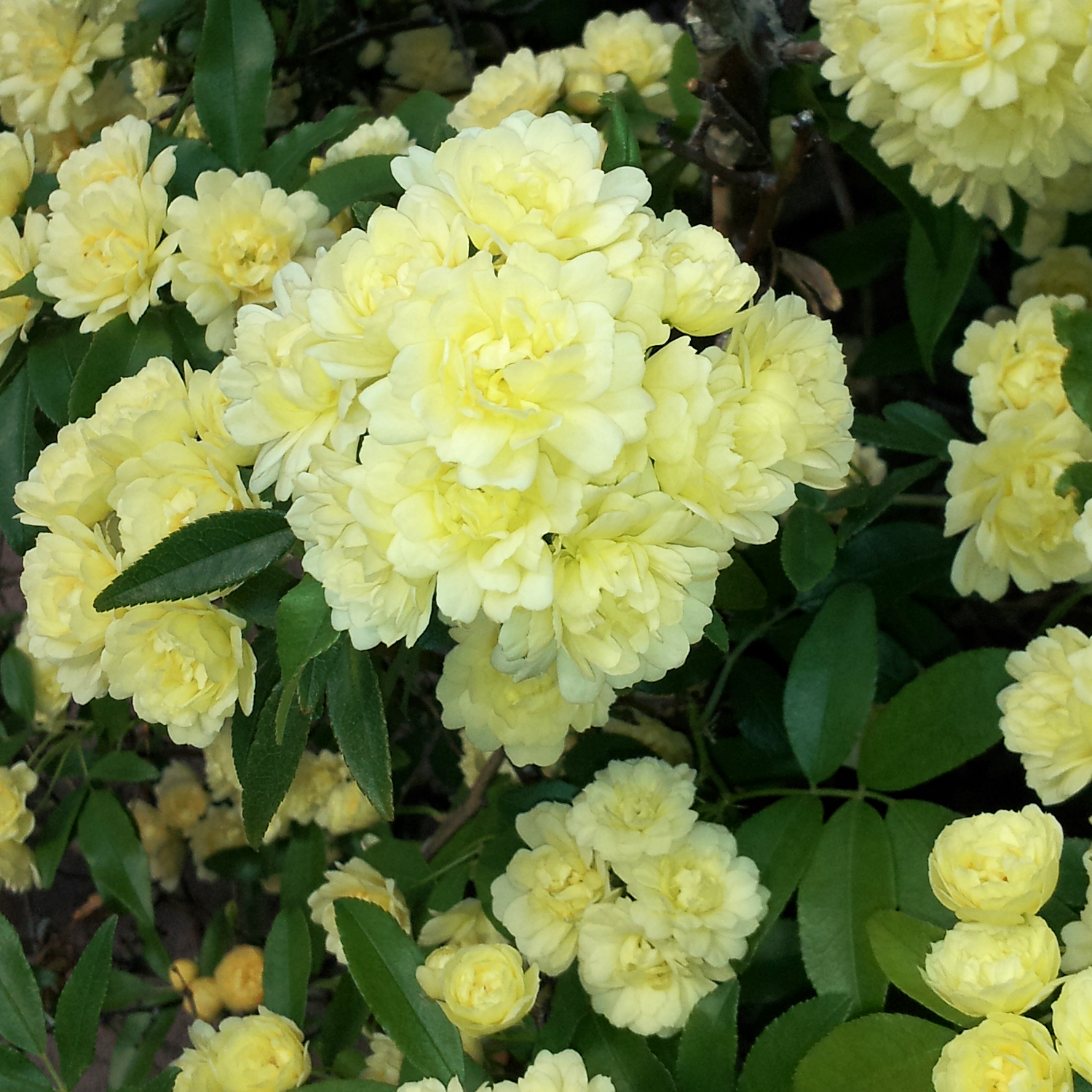
Lady Banks' Rose in full bloom. Henderson, Nevada, USA

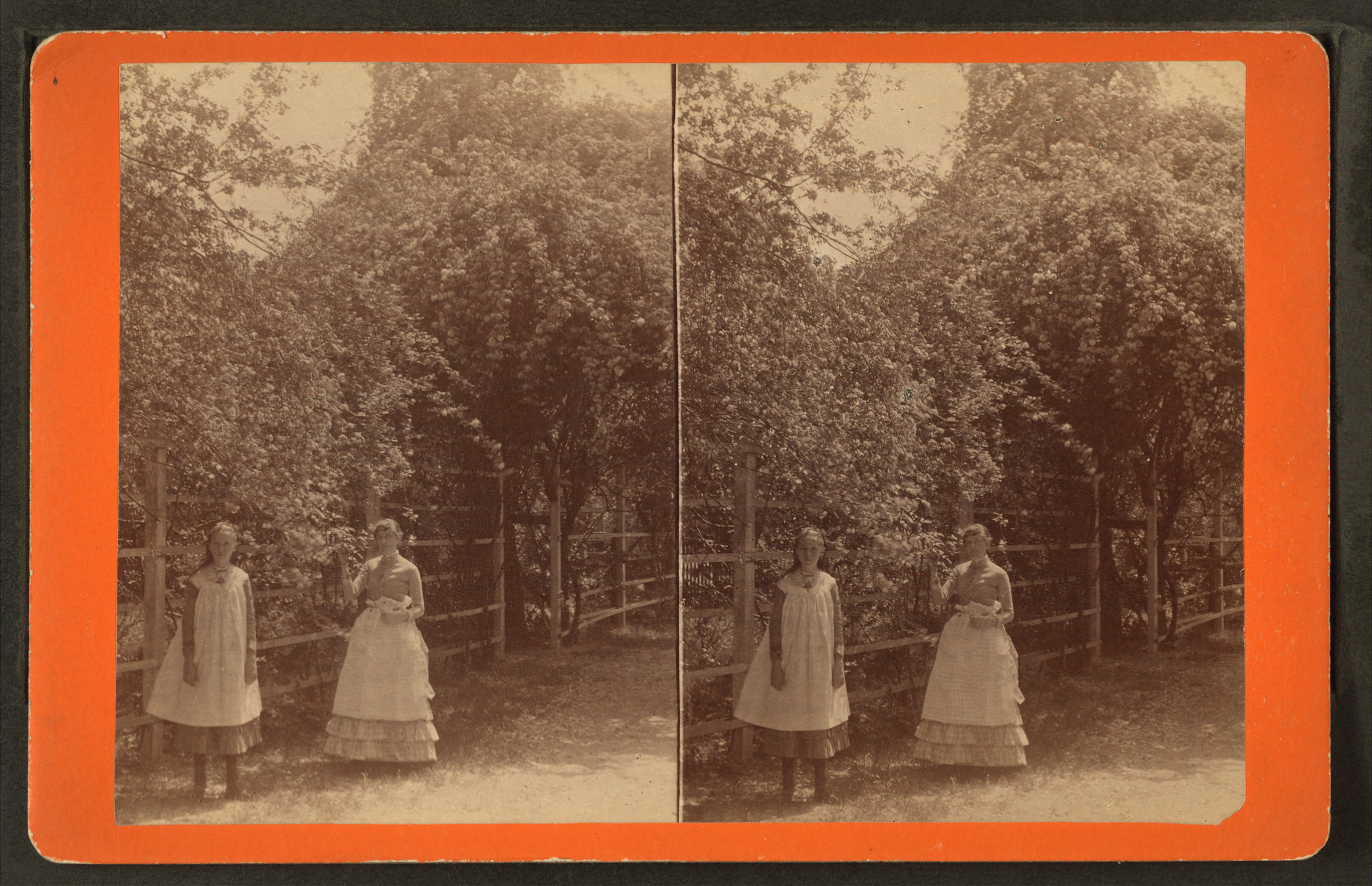
Banksia rose, by J. A. Palmer

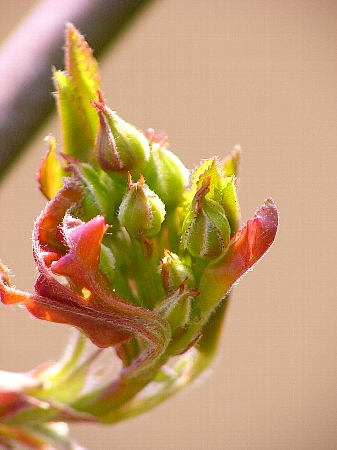
Buds in early spring

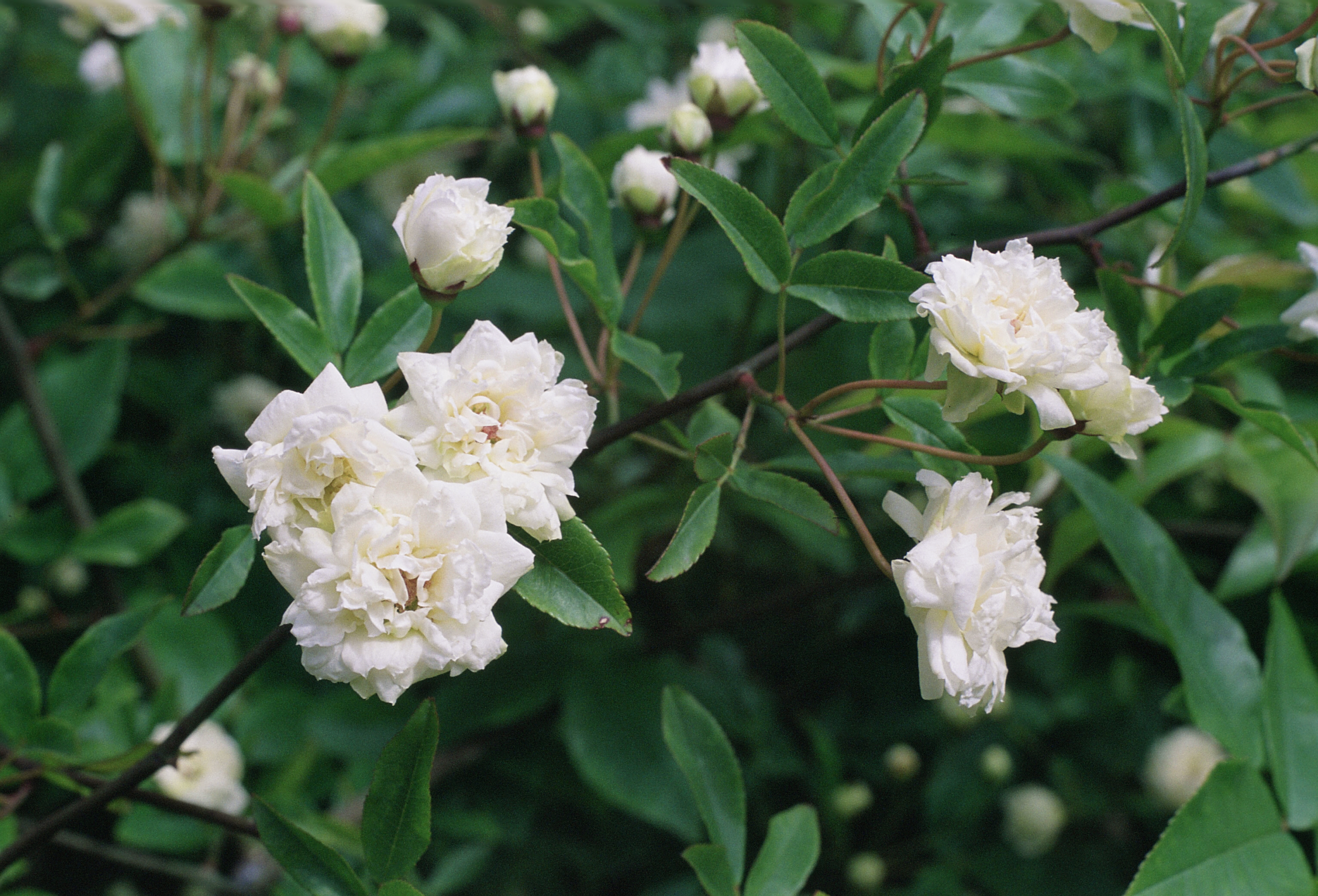
Rosa banksiae var. banksiae

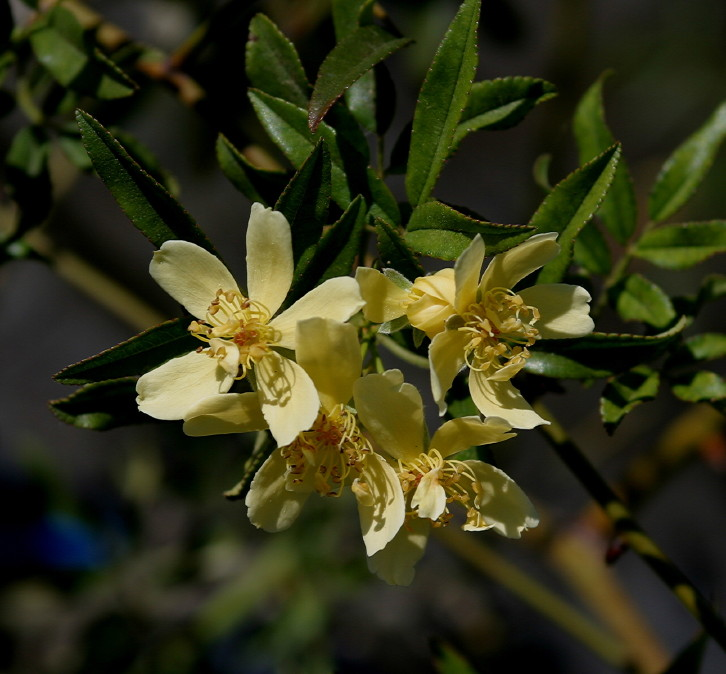
Rosa banksiae var. normalis

Flower closeup

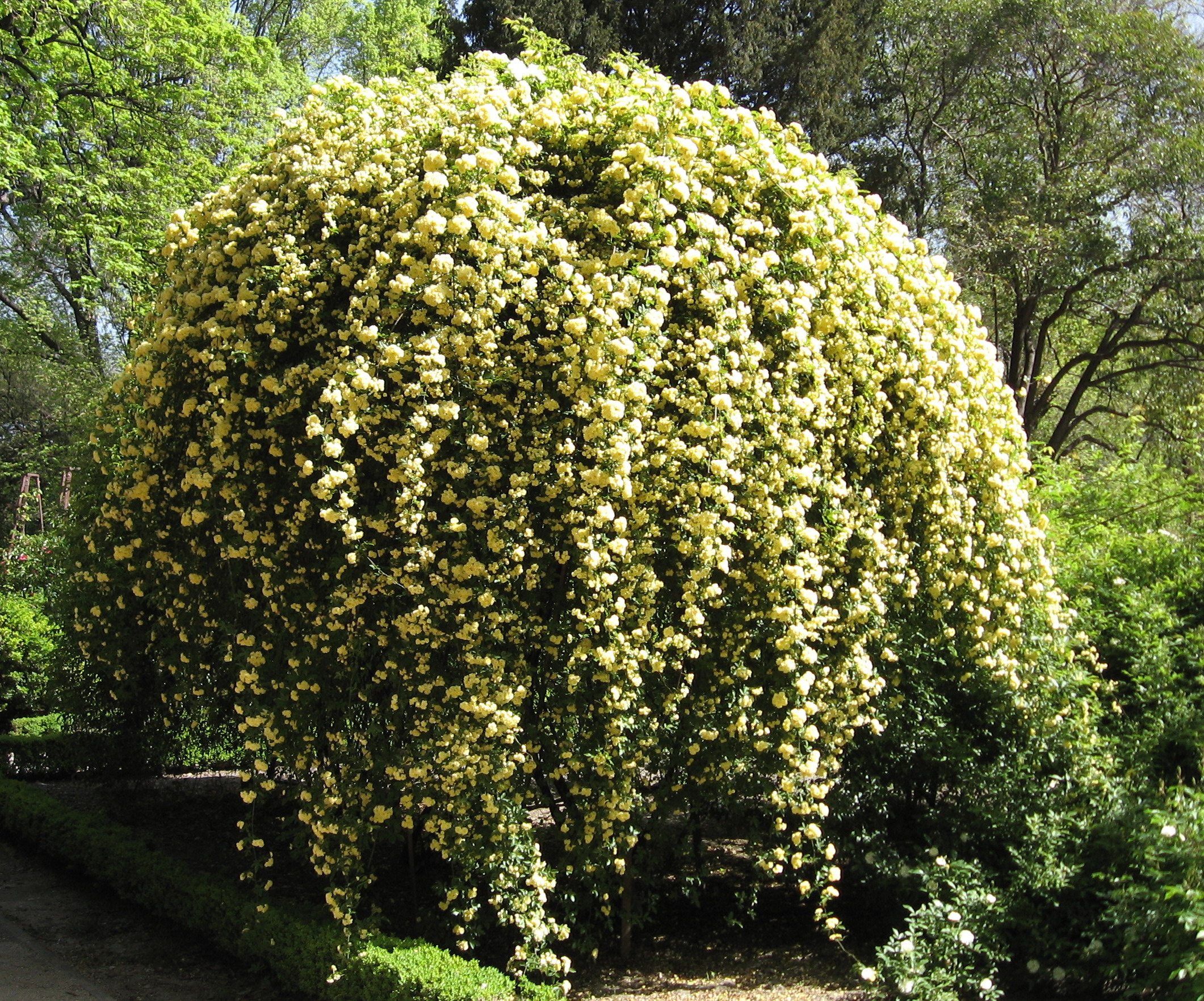
Rosa banksiae var. lutea in the Rose Garden of the Royal Botanical Garden of Madrid

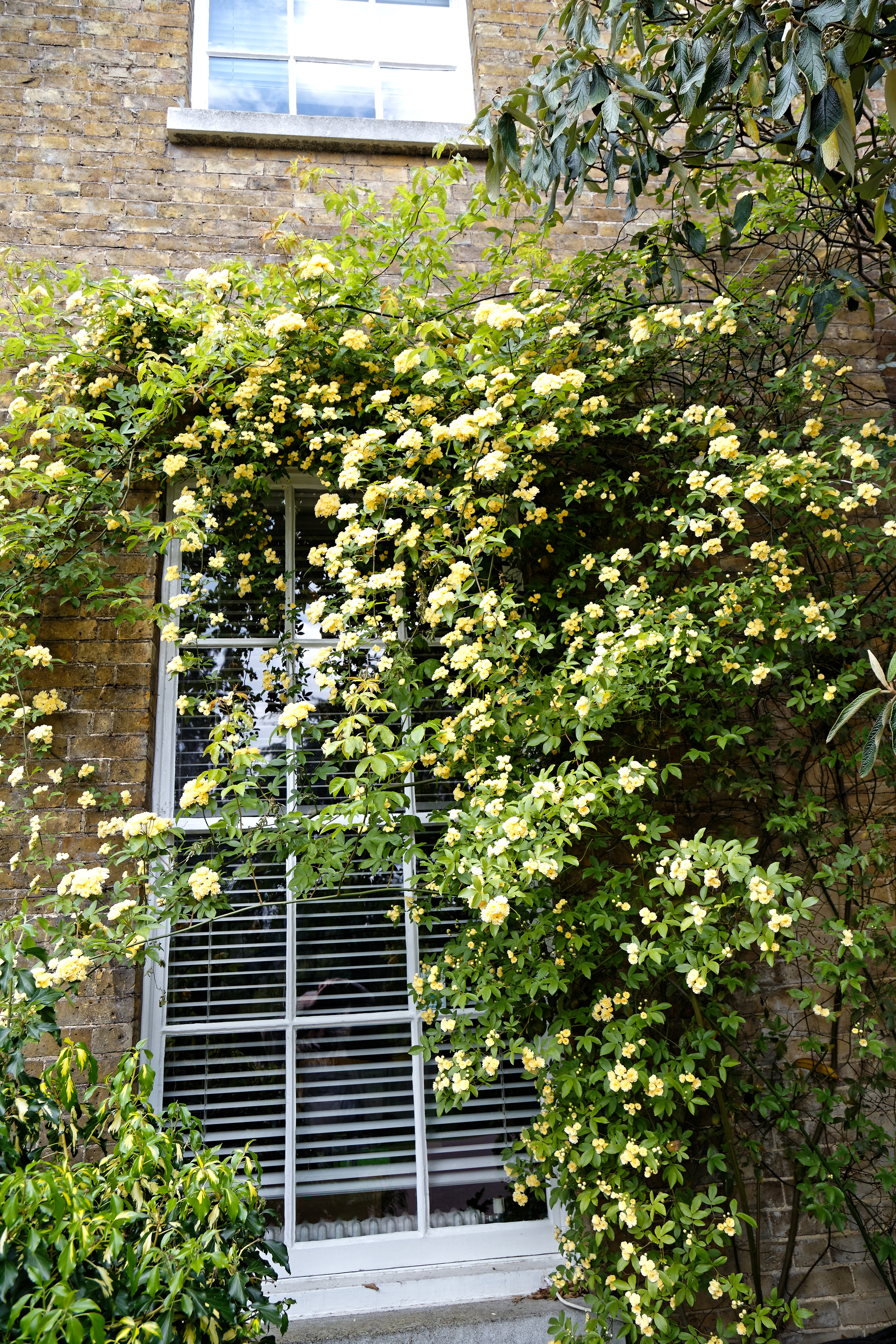
Trailing towards a window

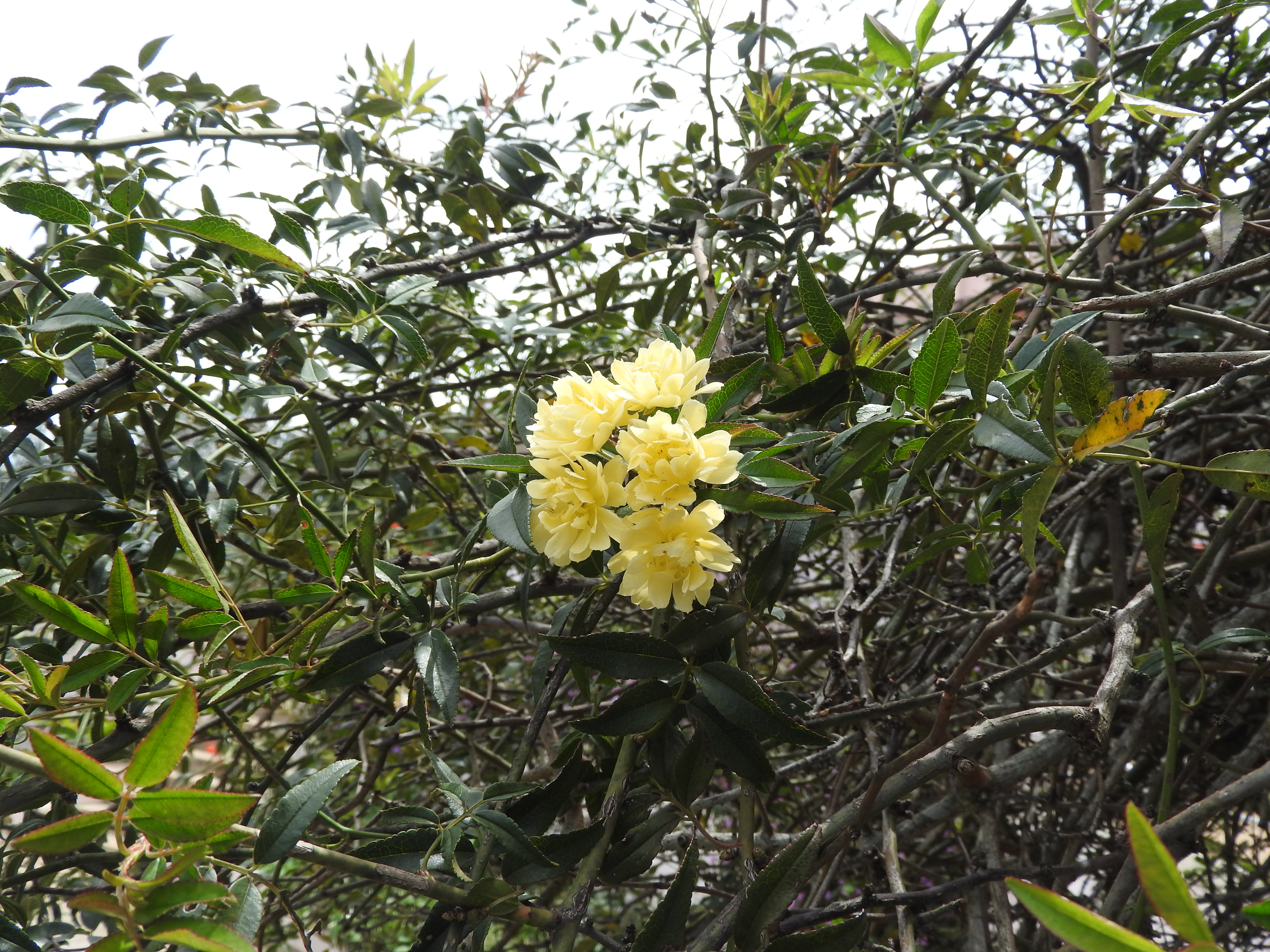
Bushy setting

== Other sources ==
- Climbing Roses of the World by Charles Quest-Ritson
- The Graham Stuart Thomas Rose Book by Graham Stuart Thomas
