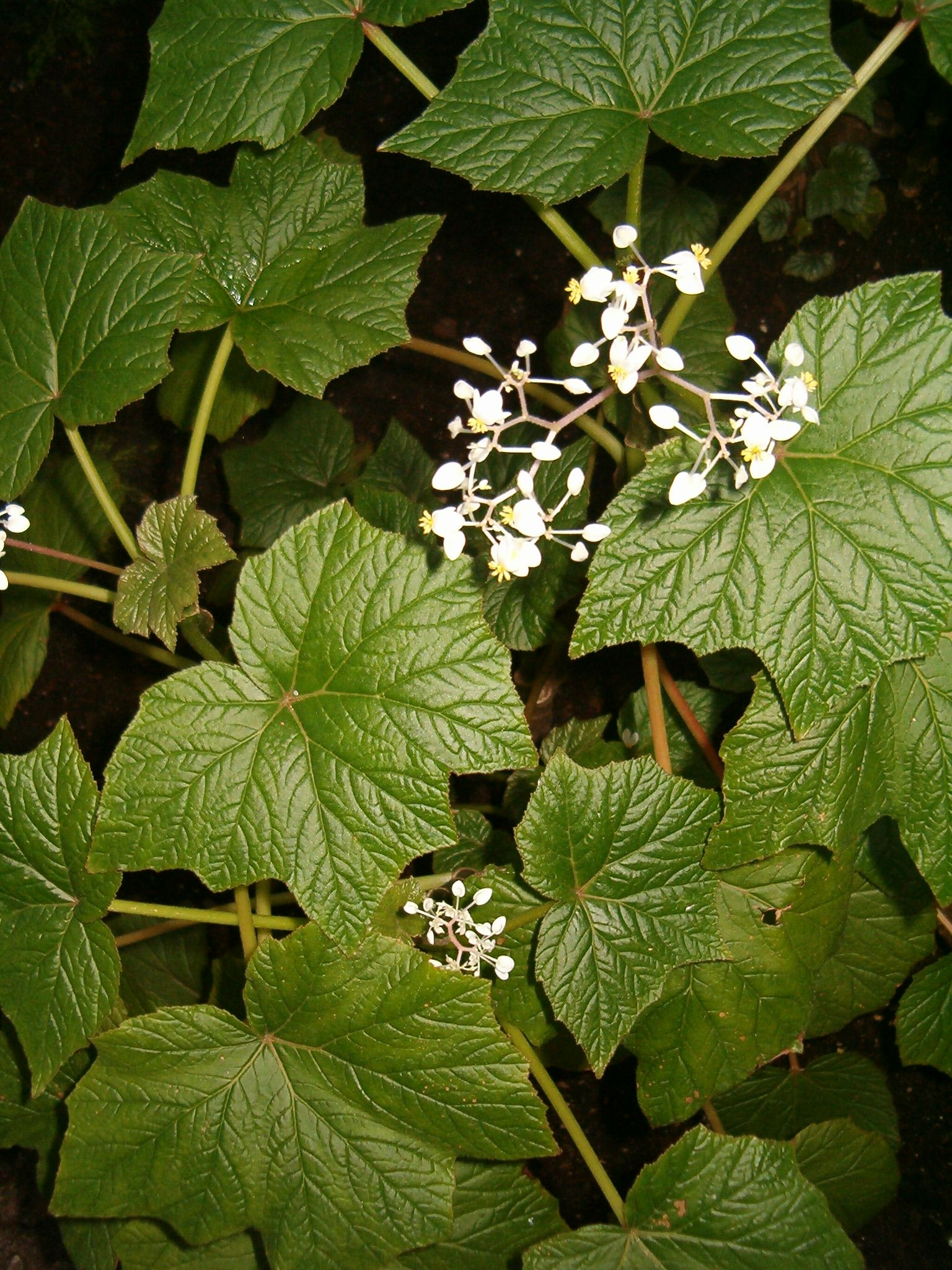
- At the Berlin Botanical Garden and Botanical Museum
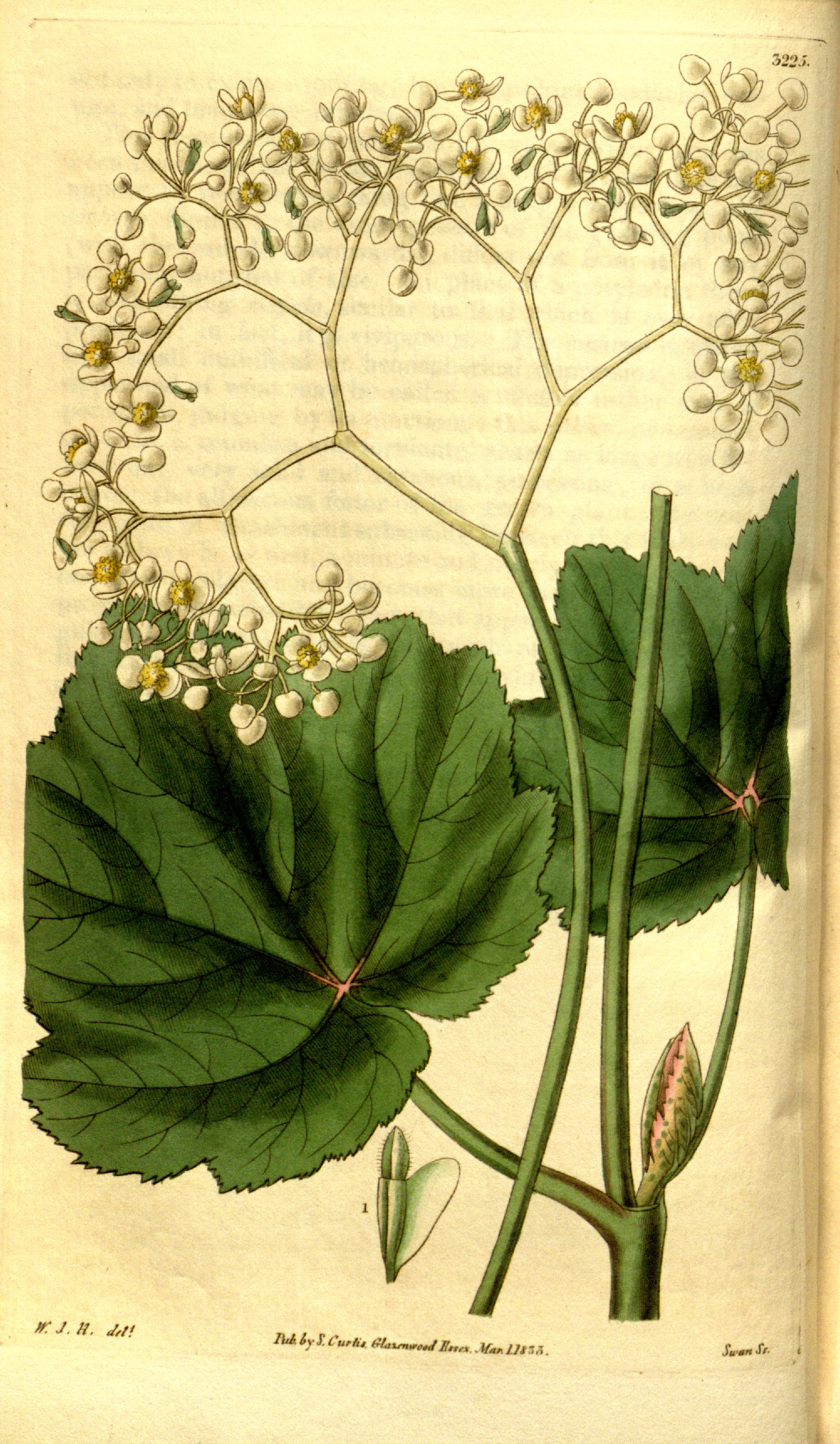
- Botanical illustration

Scientific classification
- Kingdom: Plantae
- Clade: Tracheophytes
- Clade: Angiosperms
- Clade: Eudicots
- Clade: Rosids
- Order: Cucurbitales
- Family: Begoniaceae
- Genus: Begonia
- Species: B. reniformis

Binomial name
- Begonia reniformis Dryand.

Synonyms
- List: Begonia elatior Steud.; Begonia grandis Otto ex A.DC.; Begonia huberi C.DC.; Begonia longipes Hook.; Begonia longipes var. laticordata A.DC.; Begonia palmifolia B.H.Buxton; Begonia truncata Vell.; Begonia valida Goebel; Begonia vitifolia Schott; Begonia vitifolia var. bahiensis A.DC.; Begonia vitifolia var. grandis A.DC.; Wageneria longipes (Hook.) Klotzsch; Wageneria reniformis (Dryand.) Klotzsch; Wageneria vitifolia (Schott) Klotzsch

= Begonia reniformis =

Species of plant

Begonia reniformis, the grape leaf begonia or grapeleaf begonia (a name it shares with Begonia dregei), is a species of flowering plant in the family Begoniaceae. It is native to central and eastern Brazil, and has been introduced to Hawaii. A perennial shrub with white flowers, it can reach 1.5 m (5 ft) tall.
