= William Banks (barrister) =

English barrister and Member of Parliament

William Banks (19 April 1719 – September 1761) was an English barrister and the father of Sir Joseph Banks, the naturalist and Sarah Sophia Banks, the collector. He was also a Member of Parliament for six years, and from 1733 to 1741 was known as William Hodgkinson.

== Life ==
Banks was the younger son of politician Joseph Banks of Revesby Abbey, Lincolnshire. After being educated at Westminster School he entered the Middle Temple in 1736 to study law.

In 1741 he was elected as one of the two Members of Parliament for Grampound, sitting until 1747. He was unable to seek re-election after the loss of the use of his legs, due to an illness in 1745.

Banks married Sarah, the daughter of William Bate of Derbyshire, with whom he had a son, Sir Joseph Banks the famous naturalist, and a daughter, Sarah Sophia Banks. He succeeded his wife's grandfather in 1733, adopting the name of Hodgkinson, but reverted to Banks on succeeding his own father in 1741, his elder brother Joseph having died the year before.
