= William Parry (artist) =

Welsh artist (1743–1791)

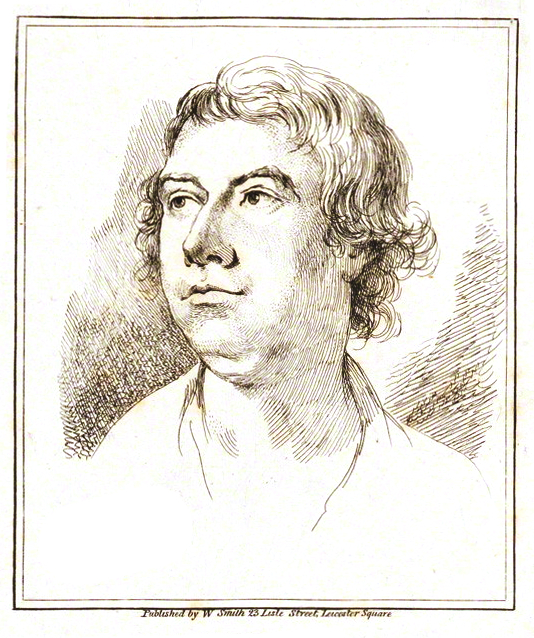
Engraving of William Parry from James Northcote's biography of Joshua Reynolds (1819)

William Parry ARA (2 May 1743 – 12 February 1791) was a Welsh artist. Primarily a portrait painter, he attracted extensive patronage in Wales due to his connections with Sir Watkin Williams-Wynn, 4th Baronet.

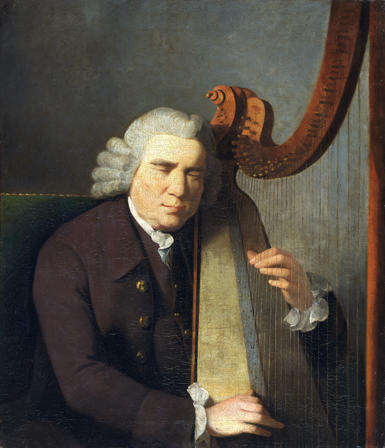
Portrait of John Parry, William's father, circa 1770. National Museum Cardiff

He was the son of John Parry, a blind harpist who held a key position in the household of Sir Watkin Williams-Wynn, 3rd Baronet of Wynnstay, Denbighshire, the wealthiest and most powerful Welshman of the time. At the age of sixteen he enrolled at William Shipley's drawing academy, later becoming a pupil to Joshua Reynolds. In late 1769 or early 1770 he returned to Wales, where the Wynnstay estate had lately been inherited by the third baronet's son, an art lover who had just returned from his Grand Tour. He also received commissions for chalk and painted portraits from others in the Welsh gentry. Sir Watkin funded Parry's own Grand Tour in 1770–5, during which he produced full-scale copies of paintings by Raphael and Correggio. In 1776 he was elected an Associate of the Royal Academy, having exhibited five portraits in that year's Summer Exhibition. In around 1775–6, he painted the Portrait of Omai with Sir Joseph Banks and Dr Daniel Solander, one of his most celebrated works. In 1779 Parry's wife Elizabeth (née Keene) died in childbirth. In 1789 Parry returned to Italy, according to James Northcote, "to seek employment in art, in addition to the wish of stifling the regret for the loss of an amiable wife". After a sudden decline in his health, he returned to London, where he died in 1791, aged 47.
