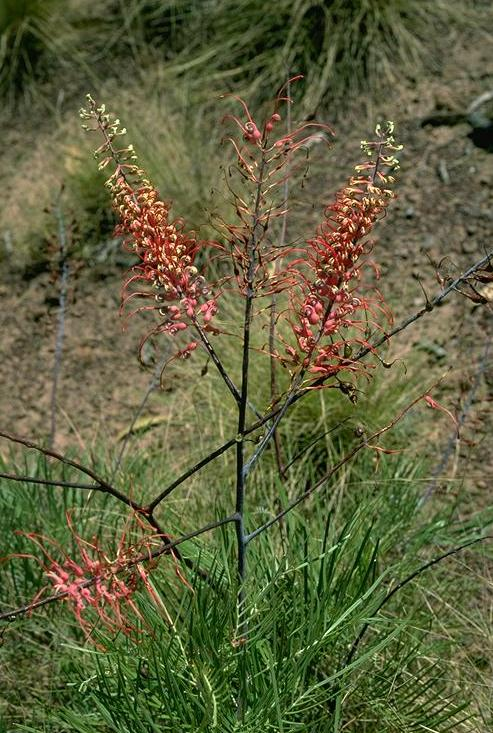
- Subsp. dryandri west of Normanton

Conservation status
- Least Concern (IUCN 3.1)

Scientific classification
- Kingdom: Plantae
- Clade: Embryophytes
- Clade: Tracheophytes
- Clade: Spermatophytes
- Clade: Angiosperms
- Clade: Eudicots
- Order: Proteales
- Family: Proteaceae
- Genus: Grevillea
- Species: G. dryandri

Binomial name
- Grevillea dryandri R.Br.

Synonyms
- Grevillea callipteris Meisn. nom. inval., nom. nud.; Grevillea callipteris Meisn.; Grevillea rigens A.Cunn. ex R.Br.

= Grevillea dryandri =

Species of shrub native to Western Australia

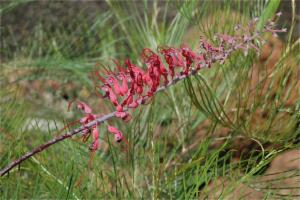
Subsp. dasycarpa at Darwin Airport

Grevillea dryandri is a species of flowering plant in the family Proteaceae and is endemic to northern Australia. It is a spreading to erect shrub with divided leaves with up to seventy or more linear to narrowly elliptic leaves, and long clusters of red, orange-red, pink or white flowers.

== Description ==
Grevillea dryandri is a spreading to erect shrub that typically grows to a height of 0.3–2 cm (0.12–0.79 in). It has divided leaves 40–280 mm (1.6–11.0 in) long with mostly ten to sixty linear to narrowly lance-shaped lobes 40–210 mm (1.6–8.3 in) long and 0.7–3 mm (0.028–0.118 in) wide with the edges turned down or rolled under. The lower surface of the leaflets is silky-hairy. The flowers are arranged in clusters, the rachis 100–600 mm (3.9–23.6 in) long, each flower on a pedicel 4.5–10 mm (0.18–0.39 in) long. The flowers are red, orange-red, pink or white, the pistil 41–50 mm (1.6–2.0 in) long. Flowering time depends on subspecies and the fruit is a thin-walled follicle 7.5–15 mm (0.30–0.59 in) long.

== Taxonomy ==
Grevillea dryandri was first formally described in 1810 by Robert Brown in the Transactions of the Linnean Society of London from specimens collected in Arnhem Land. The specific epithet (dryandri) honours Jonas Carlsson Dryander.

In 1986, Donald McGillivray described two subspecies of G. dryandri and the names are accepted by the Australian Plant Census:

- Grevillea dryandri subsp. dasycarpa McGill. differs from the autonym in having leaves with fourteen to thirty pairs of thread-like lobes up to 105 mm (4.1 in) long and 1 mm (0.039 in) wide, pink to bright red flowers with a darker style from March to July, and fruit that is sticky with glandular hairs;
- Grevillea dryandri R.Br. subsp. dryandri has leaves with 6 to 32 linear lobes 68–180 mm (2.7–7.1 in) long, 1.3–4 mm (0.051–0.157 in) wide and usually not paired, red, sometimes cream-coloured to white flowers with a red or paler style mostly from January to May, and fruit that is sticky but glabrous;

== Distribution and habitat ==
Subspecies dasycarpa grows in shrubby woodland on sandstone between Mataranka, Daly River and the Gove Peninsula in the northern part of the Northern Territory. Subspecies dryandri grows in open woodland or open shrubland, often in rocky places, from the Kimberley region of Western Australia, to the Northern Territory north of about Tennant Creek and to northern parts of Queensland, mainly as far as Mount Isa and Normanton.

== Conservation status ==
Grevillea dryandri is listed as least concern on the IUCN Red List of Threatened Species, due to it being a widely distributed, locally common species with no major threats affecting its population. Both subspecies of G. dryandri are listed as of least concern under the Northern Territory Government Territory Parks and Wildlife Conservation Act.
