= Joseph Banks =

English naturalist and botanist (1743–1820)

Sir Joseph Banks Bt GCB FRS
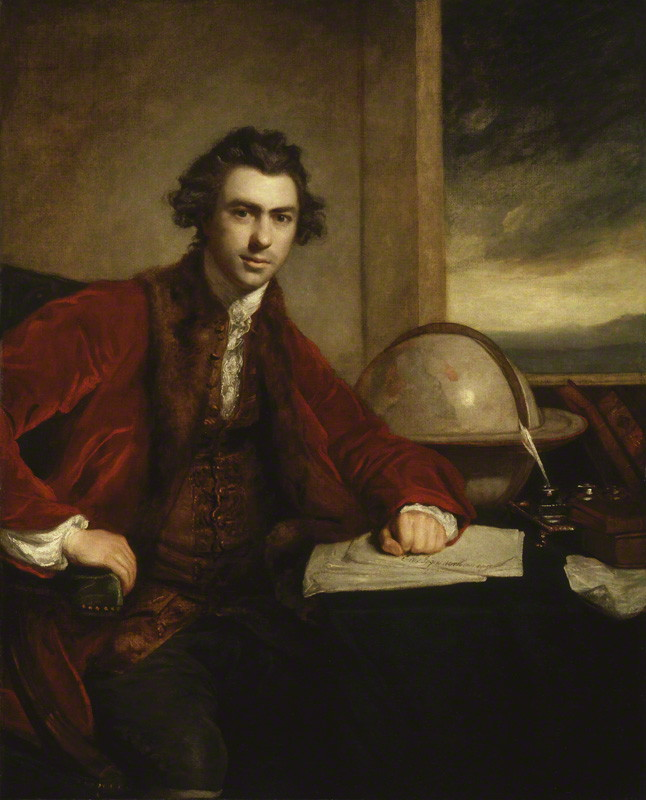
- Portrait of Joseph Banks by Sir Joshua Reynolds, 1773
- Born: 24 February 1743 (13 February O.S.); 30 Argyll Street, London, England
- Died: 19 June 1820 (aged 77); Spring Grove House, Isleworth, London, England
- Education: Christ Church, Oxford
- Known for: Voyage of HMS Endeavour, exploration of Botany Bay
- Spouse: Dorothea Banks
- Scientific career
- Fields: Botany
- Workplaces: Royal Botanic Gardens, Kew
- Author abbrev. (botany): Banks

21st President of the Royal Society
- In office 1778–1820
- Preceded by: Sir John Pringle
- Succeeded by: William Hyde Wollaston

Signature
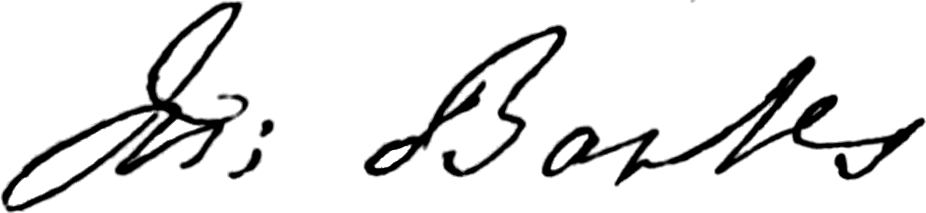

Sir Joseph Banks, 1st Baronet (24 February 1743 [O.S. 13 February 1742] – 19 June 1820) was an English naturalist, botanist, and patron of the natural sciences.

Banks made his name on the 1766 natural-history expedition to Newfoundland and Labrador. He took part in Captain James Cook's first great voyage (1768–1771), visiting Brazil, Tahiti, and after 6 months in New Zealand, Australia, returning to immediate fame. He held the position of president of the Royal Society for over 41 years. He advised King George III on the Royal Botanic Gardens, Kew, sending botanists around the world to collect plants, he made Kew the world's leading botanical garden. He is credited for bringing 30,000 plant specimens home with him; amongst them, he was the first European to document 1,400.

Banks advocated British settlement in New South Wales and the colonisation of Australia, as well as the establishment of Botany Bay as a place for the reception of convicts, and advised the British government on all Australian matters. He is credited with introducing the eucalyptus, acacia, and the genus named after him, Banksia, to the Western world. Around 80 species of plants bear his name. He was the leading founder of the African Association and a member of the Society of Dilettanti, which helped to establish the Royal Academy.

== Early life ==
Banks was born in Argyll Street, Soho, London, the son of William Banks, a wealthy Lincolnshire country squire and member of the House of Commons, and his wife Sarah, daughter of William Bate. He was baptised at St James's Church, Piccadilly, on 20 February 1743, Old Style. He had a younger sister, Sarah Sophia Banks, born in 1744.

=== Education ===
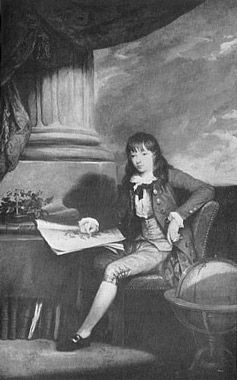
A 1757 portrait of Banks with a botanical illustration, unknown artist, but attributed to Lemuel Francis Abbott or Johann Zoffany

Banks was educated at Harrow School from the age of nine and then at Eton College from 1756; the boys with whom he attended the school included his future shipmate Constantine Phipps.

As a boy, Banks enjoyed exploring the Lincolnshire countryside and developed a keen interest in nature, history, and botany. When he was 17, he was inoculated with smallpox, but he became ill and did not return to school. In late 1760, he was enrolled as a gentleman-commoner at the University of Oxford. At Oxford, he matriculated at Christ Church, where his studies were largely focused on natural history rather than the classical curriculum. Determined to receive botanical instruction, he paid the Cambridge botanist Israel Lyons to deliver a series of lectures at Oxford in 1764.

Banks left Oxford for Chelsea in December 1763. He continued to attend the university until 1764, but left that year without taking a degree. His father had died in 1761, so when Banks reached the age of 21, he inherited the large estate of Revesby Abbey, in Lincolnshire, becoming the local squire and magistrate, and dividing his time between Lincolnshire and London. From his mother's house in Chelsea, he kept up his interest in science by attending the Chelsea Physic Garden of the Worshipful Society of Apothecaries and the British Museum, where he met the Swedish naturalist Daniel Solander. He began to make friends among the scientific men of his day and to correspond with Carl Linnaeus, whom he came to know through Solander. As Banks's influence increased, he became an adviser to King George III and urged the monarch to support voyages of discovery to new lands, hoping to indulge his own interest in botany. He became a Freemason sometime before 1769.

== Newfoundland and Labrador ==
In 1766, Banks was elected to the Royal Society, and in the same year, at 23, he went with Phipps aboard the frigate HMS Niger to Newfoundland and Labrador with a view to studying their natural history. He made his name by publishing the first Linnean descriptions of the plants and animals of Newfoundland and Labrador. Banks also documented 34 species of birds, including the great auk, which became extinct in 1844. On 7 May, he noted a large number of "penguins" swimming around the ship on the Grand Banks, and a specimen he collected in Chateau Bay, Labrador, was later identified as the great auk.

== The Endeavour voyage ==
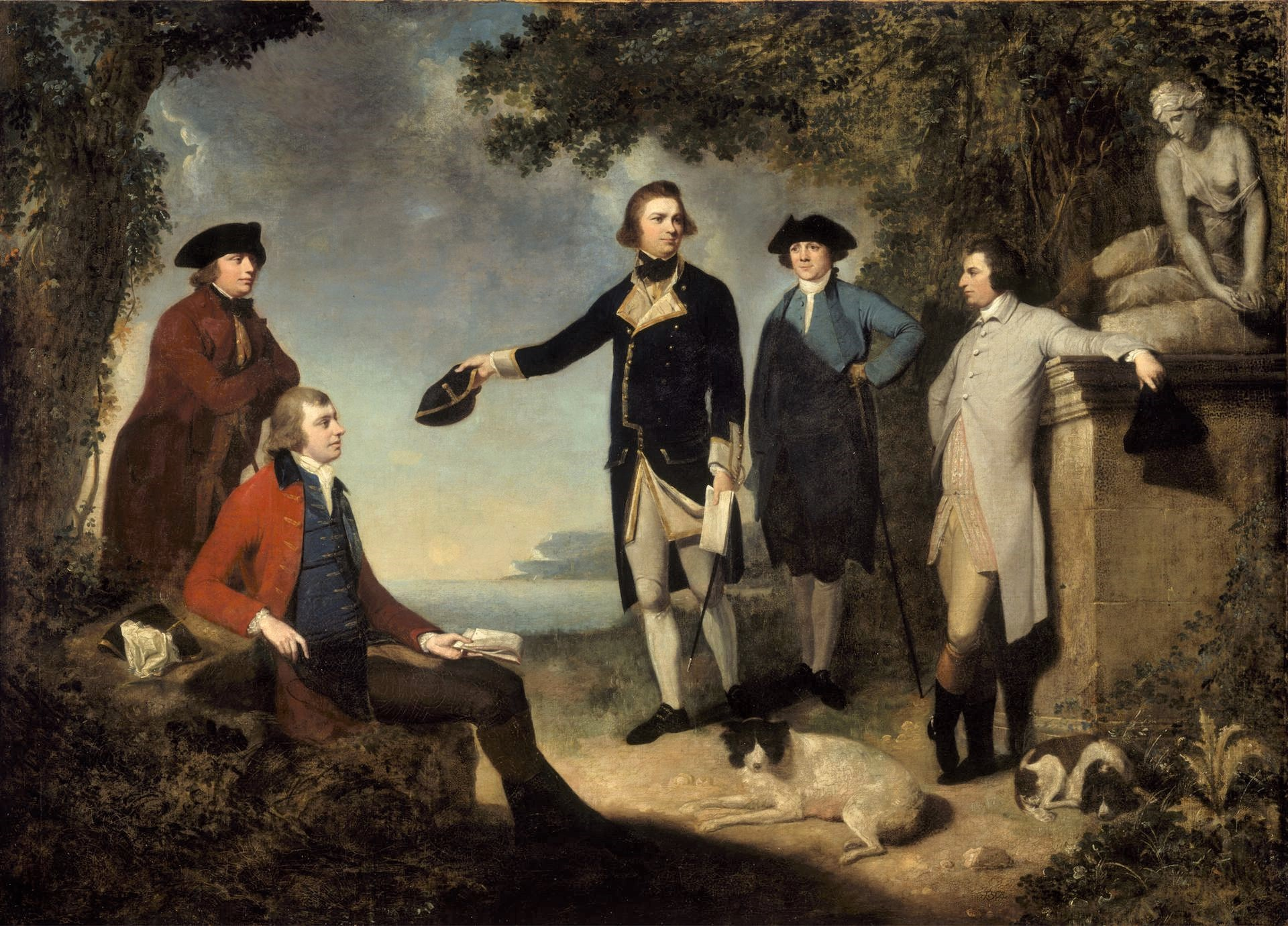
Dr Daniel Solander, Sir Joseph Banks, Captain James Cook, Dr John Hawkesworth and Lord Sandwich by John Hamilton Mortimer, 1771. Use a cursor to see who is who.

Banks was appointed for a joint Royal Navy/Royal Society scientific expedition to the South Pacific Ocean on HMS Endeavour. The voyage started in 1768 and ended in 1771. This was the first of James Cook's voyages of discovery in that region. Banks funded eight others to join him on the ship. The Swedish naturalist Daniel Solander, the Finnish naturalist Herman Spöring who also served as Banks's personal secretary and as a draughtsman, the artists Sydney Parkinson and Alexander Buchan, as well as four servants from his estate: James Roberts, Peter Briscoe, Thomas Richmond, and George Dorlton.

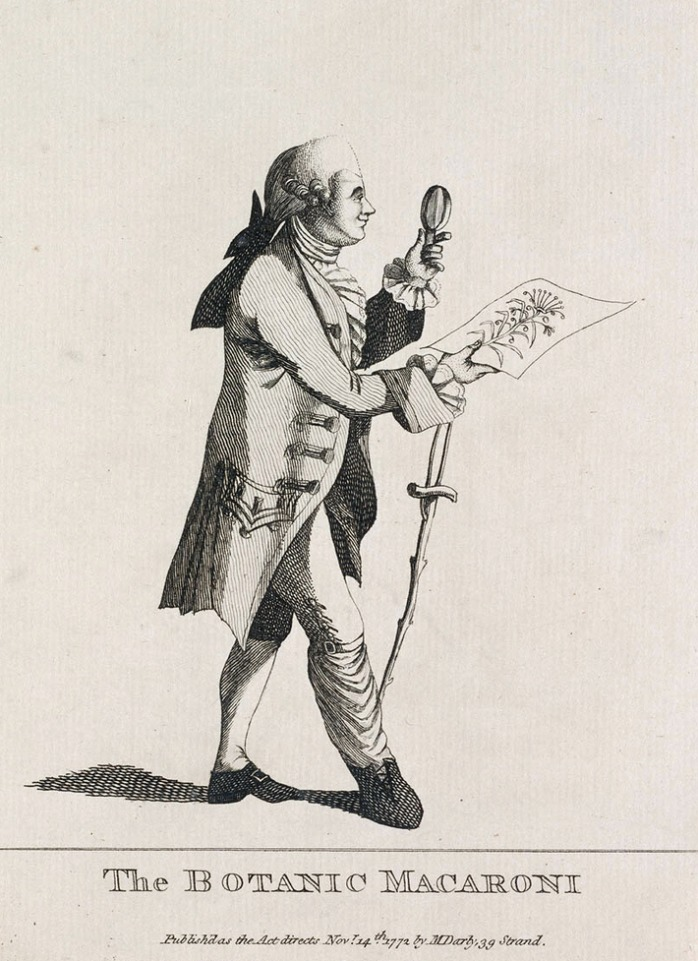
Satire on Banks titled "The Botanic Macaroni", by Matthew Darly, 1772: A macaroni was a pejorative term used for a follower of exaggerated continental fashion in the 18th century.

The voyage went to Brazil, where Banks made the first scientific description of a now common garden plant, Bougainvillea named after Cook's French counterpart, Louis Antoine de Bougainville, and to other parts of South America. The voyage progressed to Tahiti where the transit of Venus was observed as planned, then to New Zealand. From there, it proceeded to the east coast of Australia, where Cook mapped the coastline and made landfall at Botany Bay. The ship then landed at Round Hill where the scientific expedition stayed 23-25 May 1770. The area is now known as Seventeen Seventy. At Endeavour River near present day Cooktown in Queensland, they spent almost seven weeks ashore while the ship was repaired after becoming holed on the Great Barrier Reef. While they were in Australia, Banks, Daniel Solander, and the botanist Herman Spöring made the first major collection of Australian flora, describing many species new to European scientists. Almost 800 specimens were illustrated by the artist Sydney Parkinson and appeared in Banks' Florilegium, finally published in 35 volumes between 1980 and 1990. Notable also was, that during the period when the Endeavour was being repaired, Banks observed a kangaroo, first recorded as "kanguru" on 14 July 1770 in his diary.

While in the South Pacific Ocean near Tahiti in 1769, Endeavour encountered a Polynesian man named Tupaia, a native of the island of Raʻiātea. Banks decided to sponsor Tupaia because of his evident skill as a navigator and mapmaker as well as a "living souvenir" to bring back with him to England. Tupaia became a valuable translator on the voyage and would have been the first Polynesian to come to England, but died en route in the Dutch East Indies.

== Return home and voyage to Iceland ==
Banks arrived back in England on 12 July 1771. The Admiralty regarded Banks's demands as unacceptable and withdrew his permission to sail. Banks immediately arranged an alternative expedition, and in July 1772, Daniel Solander and he visited the Isle of Wight, the Hebrides, Iceland, and the Orkney Islands, aboard Sir Lawrence. In Iceland, they ascended Mt. Hekla and visited the Great Geyser, and were the first scientific visitors to Staffa in the Inner Hebrides. They returned to London in November, with many botanical specimens, via Edinburgh, where Banks and Solander were interviewed by James Boswell. In 1773, he toured south Wales in the company of artist Paul Sandby.

== Royal Botanic Gardens Kew ==
Banks settled in London and began work on his Florilegium. He kept in touch with most of the scientists of his time, was elected a foreign member of the Royal Swedish Academy of Sciences in 1773. Banks was appointed as an informal director to the Royal Botanic Gardens Kew by George III in 1773. Banks sent the first Kew plant hunters around the world, including Francis Masson, Allan Cunningham and James Bowie.

In March 1779, Banks married Dorothea Hugessen, daughter of W. W. Hugessen. His sister Sarah Sophia Banks lived in the house with Banks and his wife. He had as librarian and curator of his collections Solander, Jonas Carlsson Dryander, and Robert Brown in succession. Also in 1779, Banks took a lease on an estate called Spring Grove, the former residence of Elisha Biscoe (1705–1776), which he eventually bought outright from Biscoe's son, also Elisha, in 1808. Its 34 acres ran along the northern side of the London Road, Isleworth, and contained a natural spring, which was an important attraction to him. Banks spent much time and effort on this secondary home. He steadily created a renowned botanical masterpiece on the estate, achieved primarily with many of the great variety of foreign plants he had collected on his extensive travels around the world, particularly to Australia and the South Seas. The surrounding district became known as Spring Grove. The house was substantially extended and rebuilt by later owners and is now part of West Thames College.

Banks was made a baronet in 1781, three years after being elected president of the Royal Society. During much of this time, he was an informal adviser to King George III and his position at the Royal Botanic Gardens Kew was formalised in 1797. Banks continued to dispatch explorers and botanists to many parts of the world, and through these efforts, Kew Gardens became arguably the pre-eminent botanical garden in the world, with many species being introduced to Europe through them and through Chelsea Physic Garden and their head gardener John Fairbairn. He directly fostered several famous voyages, including that of George Vancouver to the northeastern Pacific (Pacific Northwest), and William Bligh's voyages (one entailing the infamous mutiny on the Bounty) to transplant breadfruit from the South Pacific to the Caribbean islands. Banks was also a major financial supporter of William Smith in his decade-long efforts to create a geological map of England, the first geological map of an entire country. He also chose Allan Cunningham for voyages to Brazil and the north and northwest coasts of Australia to collect specimens.

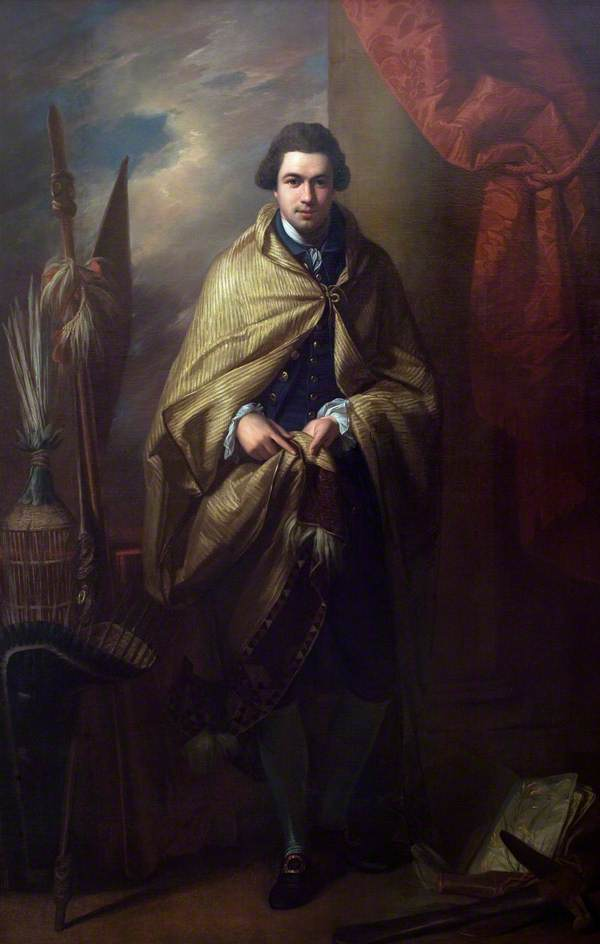
Portrait of Joseph Banks by Benjamin West, 1772

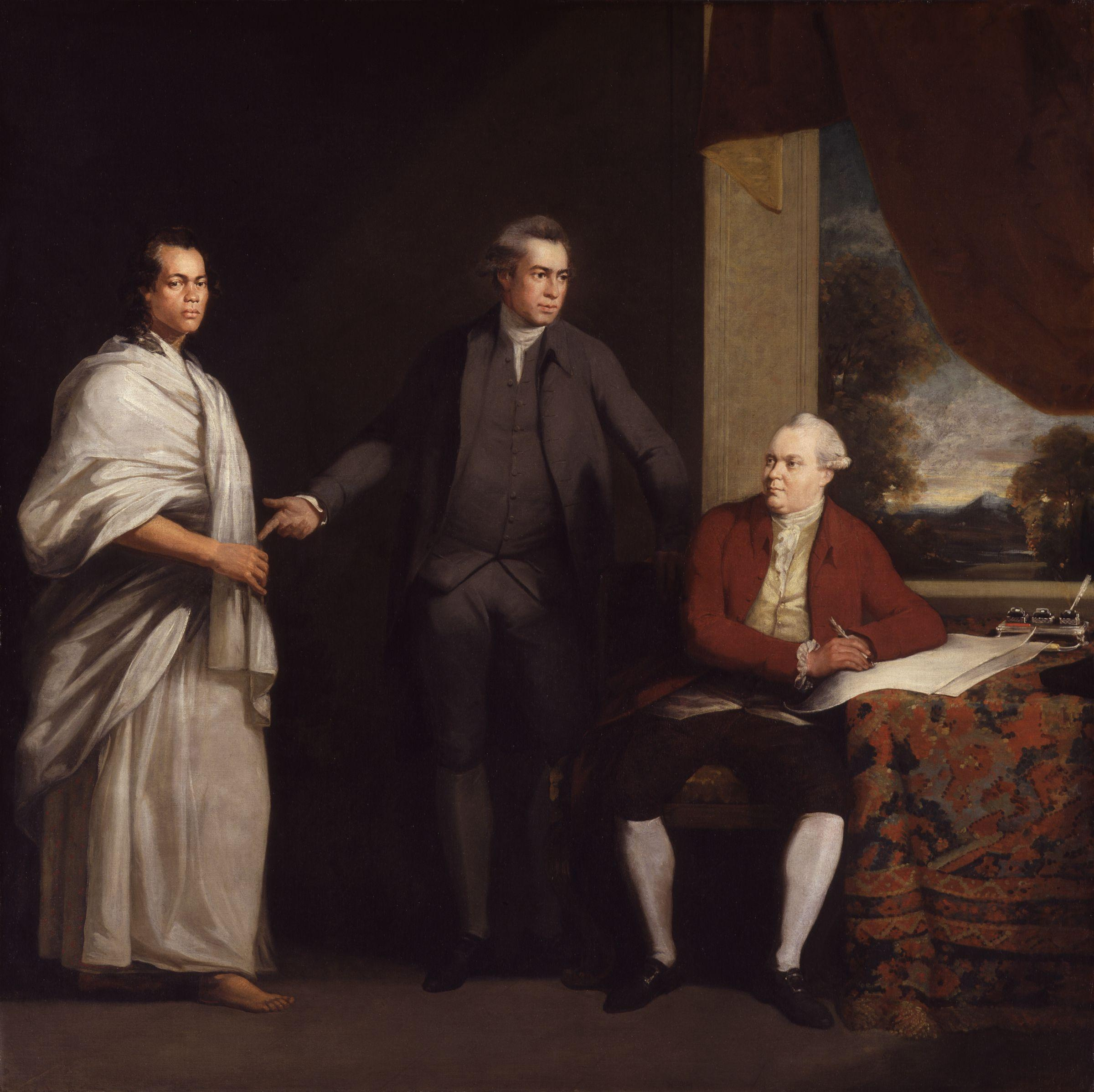
Sir Joseph Banks (centre), together with Omai (left) and Daniel Solander, painted by William Parry, c. 1775-1776

== Colonisation of New South Wales ==
Banks's own time in Australia, however, led to his interest in the British colonisation of that continent. He was to be the greatest proponent of settlement in New South Wales. A genus of the Proteaceae was named in his honour as Banksia.

Although Banks remained physically uninvolved in these colonies, he was nonetheless the general adviser to the government on all Australian matters for twenty years. Every vessel that came from New South Wales brought to Banks plants or animals or geological and other specimens and, on at least one occasion, human remains. Governor Philip Gidley King sent Banks the severed head of an Aboriginal man named Pemulwuy that Banks had seemingly listed as among his "desiderata."

The three earliest governors of the colony, Arthur Phillip, John Hunter, and Philip Gidley King, were in continual correspondence with him. Banks produced a significant body of papers, including one of the earliest Aboriginal Australian words lists compiled by a European. Bligh was also appointed governor of New South Wales on Banks's recommendation. Banks followed the explorations of Matthew Flinders, George Bass, and Lieutenant James Grant, and among his paid helpers were George Caley, Robert Brown, and Allan Cunningham.

However, Banks backed William Bligh to be installed as the new governor of New South Wales and to crack down on the New South Wales Corps (or Rum Corps), which made a fortune on the trading of rum. This brought him in direct confrontation with post-Rum Rebellion de facto leaders such as John Macarthur and George Johnston. This backing led to the Rum Rebellion in Sydney, whereby the governor was overthrown by the two men. This became an embarrassment for Sir Joseph Banks, also, because years earlier, he campaigned that John Macarthur not be granted 4,000 hectares (10,000 acres) of land near Sydney in the cow pastures, which was later granted by Lord Camden. The next governor, Lachlan Macquarie, was asked to arrest Macarthur and Johnston, only to realise that they had left Sydney for London to defend themselves. He was humiliated that Macarthur and Johnston were acquitted from all charges in London and both later returned to Sydney.

== Later life ==
Banks met the young Alexander von Humboldt in 1790, when Banks was already the president of the Royal Society. Before Humboldt and his scientific travel companion and collaborator Aimé Bonpland left for what became a five-year journal of exploration and discovery, Humboldt requested a British passport for Bonpland, should the two encounter British warships. On their travels, Humboldt arranged for specimens be sent to Banks, should they be seized by the British. Banks and Humboldt remained in touch until Banks's death, aiding Humboldt by mobilising his wide network of scientific contacts to forward information to the great German scientist. Both men believed in the internationalism of science.

Banks was elected a member of the American Philosophical Society in 1787 and a foreign honorary member of the American Academy of Arts and Sciences in 1788. He was awarded an honorary fellowship of the Royal College of Physicians of Edinburgh in 1787. Among other activities, Banks found time to serve as a trustee of the British Museum for 42 years. He was high sheriff of Lincolnshire in 1794.

He worked with Sir George Staunton in producing the official account of the British mission to the Chinese Imperial court. This diplomatic and trade mission was headed by George, Earl Macartney. Although the Macartney Embassy returned to London without obtaining any concession from China, the mission could have been termed a success because it brought back detailed observations. This multivolume work was taken chiefly from the papers of Lord Macartney and from the papers of Sir Erasmus Gower, who was commander of the expedition. Banks was responsible for selecting and arranging engraving of the illustrations in this official record.

Banks was invested as a Knight of the Order of the Bath (KB) on 1 July 1795, which became Knight Grand Cross (GCB) when the order was restructured in 1815.

Banks was a large landowner and activist encloser, drainer and 'improver' in the fens at Revesby.

In 1807, William Kerr named the Lady Banks climbing rose after Banks's wife. Banks was made an honorary founding member of the Wernerian Natural History Society of Edinburgh in 1808. In 1809, he became associated member of the Royal Institute of the Netherlands. In 1809, his friend Alexander Henry dedicated his travel book to him. In 1819, Fabian Gottlieb von Bellingshausen, on his First Russian Antarctic Expedition, briefly stopped in England and met Joseph Banks. Banks had sailed with James Cook 50 years earlier and supplied the Russians with books and charts for their expedition. He died on 19 June 1820 in Spring Grove House, Isleworth, London, and was buried at St Leonard's Church, Heston. Lady Banks survived him, but they had no children.

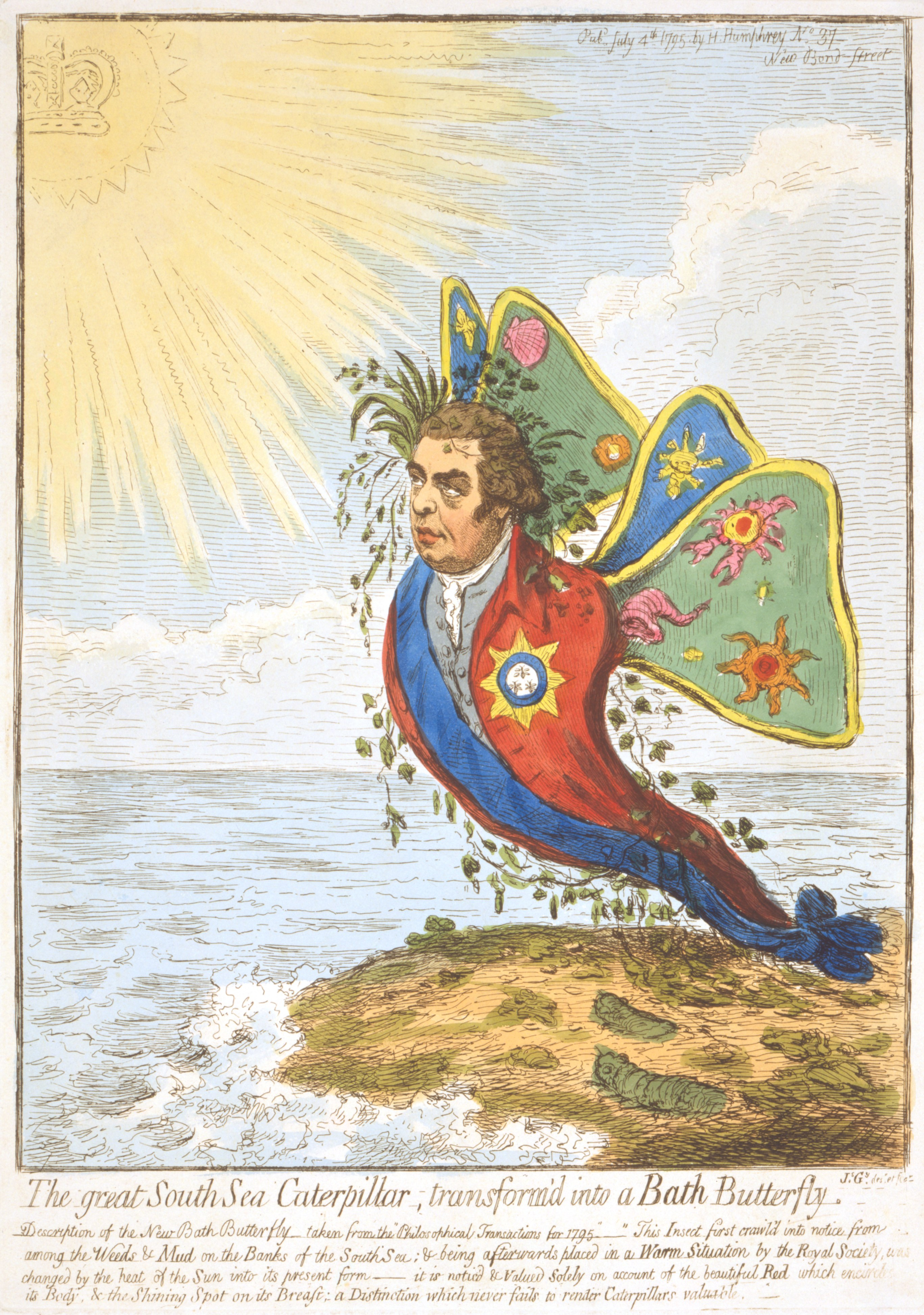
In The great South Sea Caterpillar, transform'd into a Bath Butterfly (1795), James Gillray caricatured Banks's investiture with the Order of the Bath.

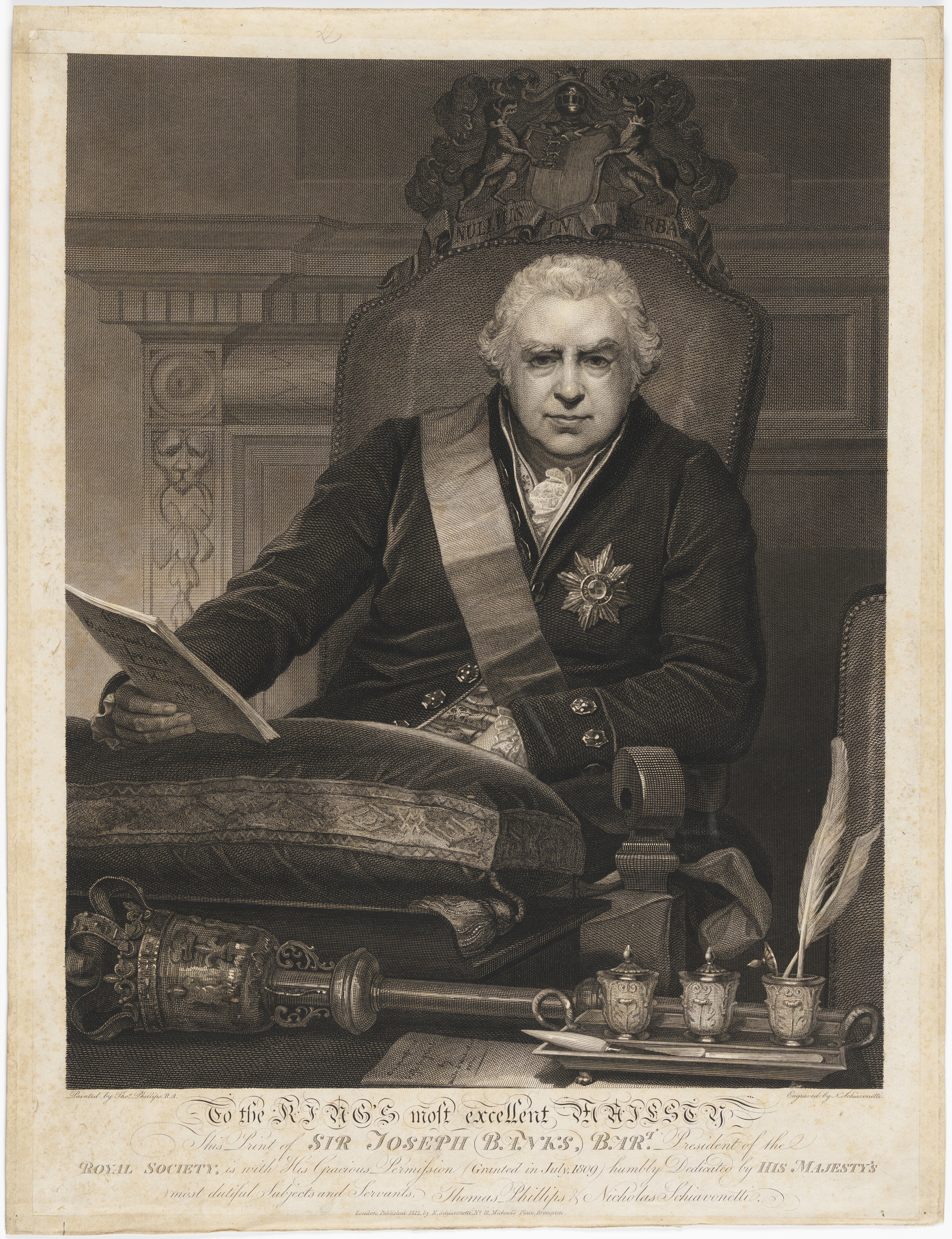
This 1812 print depicts Banks as president of the Royal Society, wearing the insignia of the Order of the Bath.

== Legacy ==
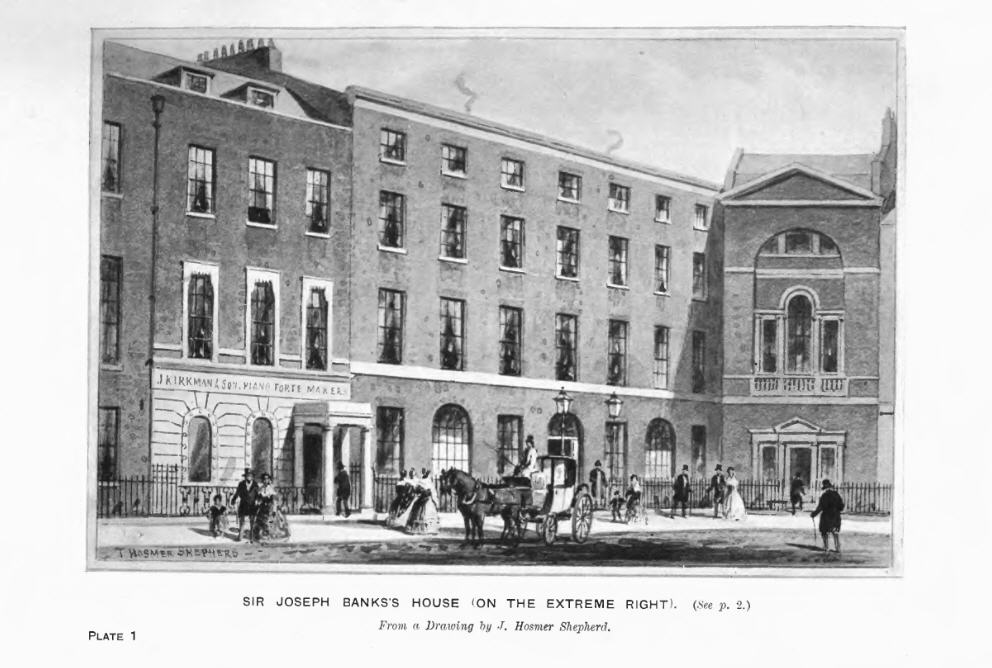
Banks's house (at right) was used for the offices of the Zoological Society of London.

Banks was a major supporter of the internationalist nature of science, being actively involved both in keeping open the lines of communication with continental scientists during the Napoleonic Wars, and in introducing the British people to the wonders of the wider world. He was honoured with many place names in the South Pacific: Banks Peninsula on the South Island, New Zealand; the Banks Islands in modern-day Vanuatu; the Banks Strait between Tasmania and the Furneaux Islands; Banks Island in the Northwest Territories, Canada; and the Sir Joseph Banks Group in South Australia.

The Canberra suburb of Banks, the electoral Division of Banks, and the Sydney suburbs of Bankstown, Banksia, and Banksmeadow are all named after him, as is the northern headland of Botany Bay, Cape Banks. A number of schools and colleges are also named after him, including the Sir Joseph Banks High School in the Sydney suburb of Revesby, and the Joseph Banks Secondary College opened in Perth, Western Australia in 2015.

An image of Banks was featured on the paper $5 Australian banknote from its introduction in 1967 before it was replaced by the later polymer currency.

In 1986, Banks was honoured by being depicted on a postage stamp issued by Australia Post.

In Lincoln, England, the Sir Joseph Banks Conservatory was constructed in 1989 at The Lawn, Lincoln; its tropical hot house had numerous plants related to Banks's voyages, with samples from across the world, including Australia. The conservatory was moved to Woodside Wildlife Park in 2016 and has been named 'Endeavour'. A plaque was installed in Lincoln Cathedral in his honour. In Boston, Lincolnshire, Banks was recorder for the town. His portrait, painted in 1814 by Thomas Phillips, was commissioned by the Corporation of Boston, as a tribute to one whose 'judicious and active exertions improved and enriched this borough and neighbourhood'. It cost them 100 guineas. The portrait is now hanging in the Council Chamber of the Guildhall Museum.

The Sir Joseph Banks Centre is located in Horncastle, Lincolnshire, housed in a Grade II listed building, which was recently restored by the Heritage Trust of Lincolnshire to celebrate Banks's life. Horncastle is located a few miles from Banks's Revesby estate and the naturalist was the town's lord of the manor. The centre is located on Bridge Street. It boasts research facilities, historic links to Australia, and a garden in which rare plants can be viewed and purchased.

At the 2011 Chelsea Flower Show, an exhibition garden celebrated the historic link between Banks and the botanical discoveries of flora and fauna on his journey through South America, Tahiti, New Zealand, and eventually Australia on Captain Cook's ship Endeavour. The competition garden was the entry of Melbourne's Royal Botanic Gardens with an Australian theme. It was based on the metaphorical journey of water through the continent, related to the award-winning Australian Garden at the Royal Botanic Gardens, Cranbourne. The design won a gold medal.

In 1911, London County Council marked Banks's house at 32 Soho Square with a blue plaque. This was replaced in 1938 with a rectangular stone plaque commemorating Banks and botanists David Don and Robert Brown and meetings of the Linnean Society.

Banks appears in the historical novel Mutiny on the Bounty, by Charles Nordhoff and James Norman Hall. He appears briefly as a contact with British naval intelligence in the historical novel Post Captain, from the Aubrey–Maturin series by Patrick O'Brian. He is also featured in Elizabeth Gilbert's 2013 best-selling novel, The Signature of All Things, and is a major character in Martin Davies's 2005 novel The Conjuror's Bird.

Banks's life and influence were explored in a documentary five-part television series The Lost World of Joseph Banks in 2016.

Banks's account of the Endeavour's approach to Botany Bay might have been the basis for the invisible ships myth.

Herbarium specimens collected by Banks and Solander are cared for in herbaria, including at the National Herbarium of Victoria (MEL), Royal Botanic Gardens Victoria.

== Dispersal of Banks's papers ==
Following Banks's death in 1820 a "treasure-trove of letters and papers" was passed to Sir Edward Knatchbull, his wife's nephew. In 1828 the latter passed bound volumes of foreign correspondence to the British Library but retained the rest of the papers in the expectation that an official biography would be written. After the death of Knatchbull and his wife, the letters and papers were passed on to their son Edward Knatchbull Hugesson, 1st Baron Brabourne, who offered to sell them to the British Museum. However, in 1884 it declined to purchase them. Following that "notorious" decision the Agent General of New South Wales, Sir Saul Samuel, issued instructions for the purchase of a large portion of the papers, which now form part of the State Library of New South Wales's Brabourne Collection. The "large quantities of papers" which remained were then auctioned off at Sotheby's in London in March and April 1886. One of the successful bidders was E. A. Petherick. Many of those are now in the Petherick Collection at the National Library of Australia. During the twentieth century the National Library continued to purchase Banks's letters and papers when they came on the market.

== Banks's Library ==
Sir Joseph Banks compiled a substantial library of approximately 16,000 volumes over the course of his lifetime. It included natural history journals, transactions of learned societies and printed books including incunabula (books printed before 1500). Broadly, the library covered early science and natural history but it also included more unexpected items such as book prospectuses and newspapers. It was formed and managed by his librarians Daniel Solander, Jonas Dryander and Robert Brown, and involved an international network of correspondents. Banks's library was bequeathed to the British Museum with a life interest to Brown in 1820 and transferred by him in 1827. Some botanical material was transferred to the Natural History Museum.

Banks also donated 117 Icelandic books to the British Museum in 1773, many originating from the library of Halfdan Einarsson (1732-1785).

Banks's library is now held at the British Library.

== Online archive ==
In his Endeavour journal, Banks recorded 30 years of his life. Letters, invoices, maps, regalia, and watercolour drawings have now been digitised on the State Library of NSW website. This tool provides access to 8800 high-quality digital images.

== See also ==
- European and American voyages of scientific exploration
- List of Notable Freemasons
- History of Australia
- List of presidents of the Royal Society

== Cited sources ==
- Wulf, Andrea (2015). The Invention of Nature: Alexander von Humboldt's New World. New York: Alfred A. Knopf. ISBN 978-0385350662.

Baronetage of Great Britain
New creation	Baronet (of Revesby Abbey); 1781–1820	Extinct
Preceded by Barker baronets	Banks baronets of Revesby Abbey; 24 March 1781	Succeeded by André baronets
Professional and academic associations
Preceded by John Pringle	21st President of the Royal Society; 1778–1820	Succeeded by William Hyde Wollaston
