= Sarah Sophia Banks =

English collector of coins and ephemera

- Portrait by Angelica Kauffman
- Born: October 28, 1744; Soho
- Died: September 27, 1818 (aged 73)
- Known for: Collections in the British Museum, British Library, and the Royal Mint Museum
- Scientific career
- Fields: Natural history; Botany; Numismatics; ephemera collector

Sarah Sophia Banks (28 October 1744 – 27 September 1818) was an English antiquarian collector and the sister and collaborator of botanist Joseph Banks. She collected coins and medals and ephemera which are now historically valuable like broadsheets, newspaper clippings, visiting cards, prints, advertisements and playbills.

== Biography ==
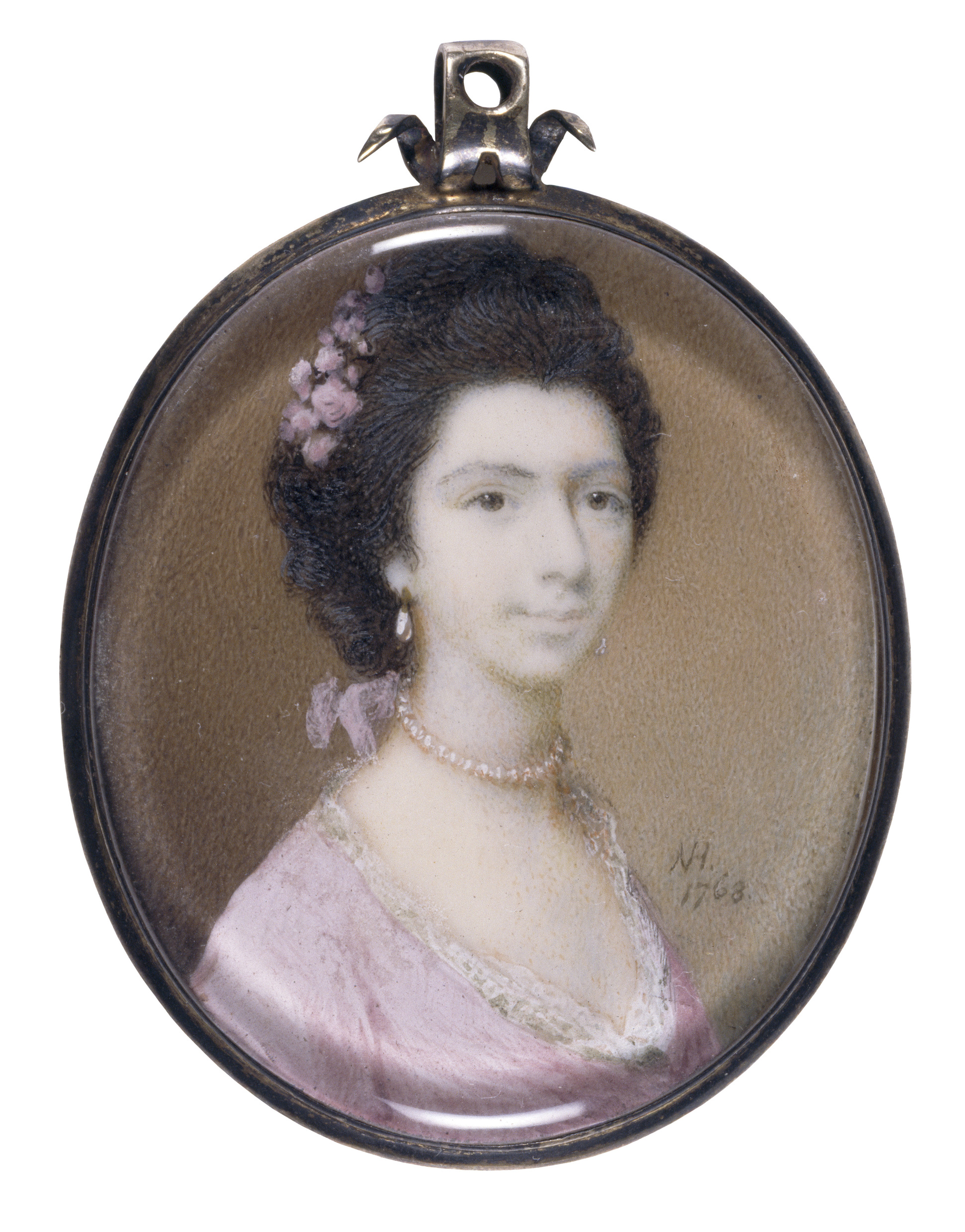
Sarah Sophia Banks by Nathaniel Hone the Elder

Banks was born on 28 October 1744 at 30 Argyll Street in Soho, London the daughter of William Banks, the Member of Parliament for Grampound, and his wife Sarah.

She "discussed questions of plant biology with her brother..." and "...influenced him greatly." Many "of her ideas made their way into his writings [and she] also provided valuable support by recopying and editing the entire manuscript of Banks' Newfoundland voyage (published 1766)."

Sarah and Joseph Banks hosted many gatherings at their house on Soho Square, which with its "vast library" full of books and collections "became a place to meet, eat and talk for those with natural history interests".

== Legacy ==
Banks' varied collections were left to her brother and sister-in-law who presented them to the British Museum and the Royal Mint Museum. Her coin collection is now divided between the British Museum and the Royal Mint, while her prints are housed between the British Museum and British Library. The rediscovery of her scrapbook on the London Monster, a man who attacked dozens of women 1788–90, led directly to Jan Bondeson's book on the subject in 2000.

== Ancestry ==
Ancestors of Sarah Sophia Banks

Robert Banks
Joseph Banks (MP died 1727)
Margaret Frankland
Joseph Banks (MP)
Rev. Rowland Hancock
Mary Hancock
William Banks (MP)
William Hodgkinson
Anne Hodgkinson
Sarah Sophia Banks
William Bate of Derbyshire
Sarah Bate
