= Jonas Carlsson Dryander =

Swedish botanist (1748–1810)

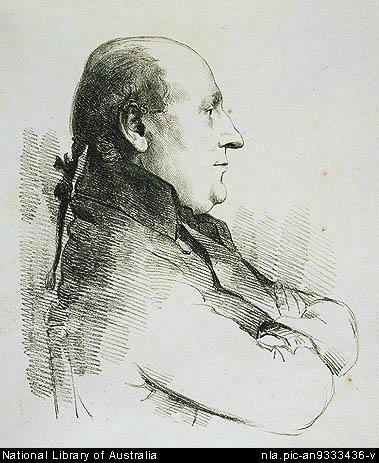
- Born: 5 March 1748; Gothenburg, Sweden
- Died: 19 October 1810 (aged 62); London, England
- Education: Lund University; Uppsala University
- Scientific career
- Fields: Botany
- Workplaces: Linnean Society of London

Jonas Carlsson Dryander (5 March 1748 – 19 October 1810) was a Swedish botanist.

== Biography ==
Dryander was born in Gothenburg, Sweden. He was the son of Carl Leonard Dryander and Brita Maria Montin. He was a pupil of Carl Linnaeus at Uppsala University. He entered Lund University in 1778 and received his Master of Philosophy in 1778.

He arrived in London on 10 July 1777. He became associated with Sir Joseph Banks and, following the death of Swedish naturalist Daniel Solander in 1782, was the librarian of the Royal Society and vice-president of the Linnean Society of London.

Dryander's publications included Catalogus bibliothecae historico-naturalis Josephi Banks (1796-1800).

In 1784, he was elected a foreign member of the Royal Swedish Academy of Sciences.

The genus Dryandra was named in his honour by his friend and fellow scientist Carl Peter Thunberg (1743–1828) and Robert Brown named Grevillea dryandri in his honour.
