= William Kerr (gardener) =

British botanist

William Kerr (died 1814) was a Scottish gardener and plant hunter, the first Western professional full-time plant collector active in China. He also collected in Java and Luzon in the Philippines. Among the plants he sent back to Kew Gardens was the vigorous shrub, at first cosseted in greenhouses, named in his honour, Kerria.

Kerr sent back to Britain examples of 238 plants new to European gardeners and to science, without, it appears, stirring far from the European trading sites of Canton and Macao, or Manila.

A native of Hawick in the Scottish Borders, he was a gardener at Kew, where he was noted by Sir Joseph Banks, and, following instruction by Banks, sent to China in 1804. He remained eight years. Kerr's finds, discovered in local Chinese gardens and plant nurseries, included Euonymus japonicus, Lilium lancifolium, Pieris japonica, Nandina domestica, Begonia grandis and the white-flowered Rosa banksiae, named for his patron's wife.

Sent to Colombo, Ceylon in 1812, to be superintendent of gardens on Slave Island and at King's House, he died there in 1814, unable "to prosecute his work in consequence of some evil habits he had contracted, as unfortunate as they were new to him," as a notice in The Chinese Repository reported some time after his premature death, apparently alluding to opium addiction.
