= John Parry (harpist, born 1710) =

Welsh musician (1710–1782)

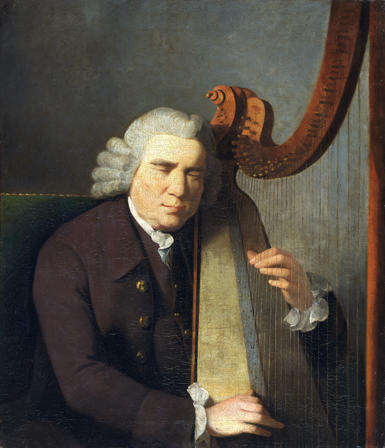
John Parry painted by William Parry

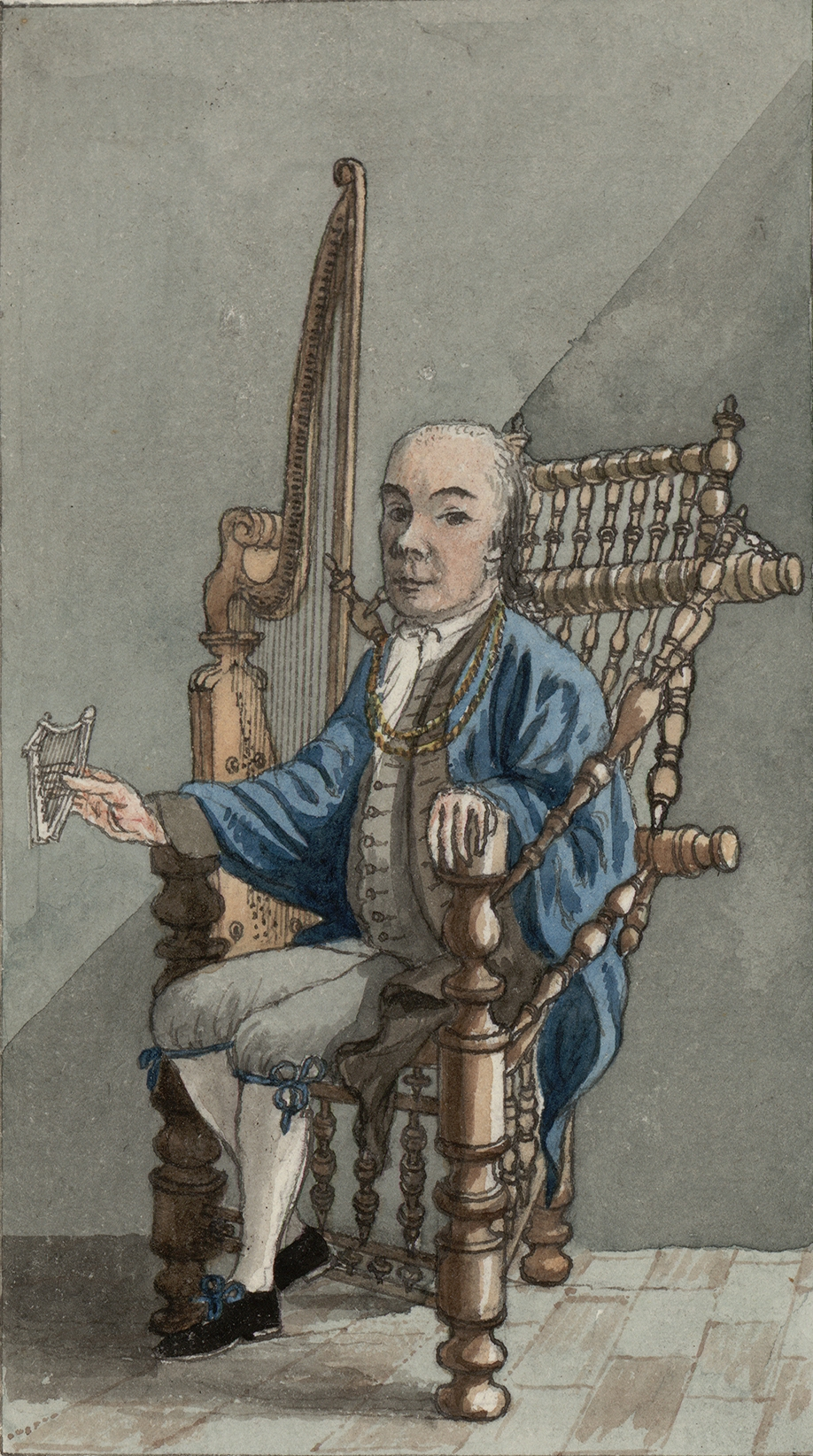
John Parry, from Pennant's A tour in Wales, 1781

John Parry (c. 1710 – 7 October 1782), known as Parri Ddall, Rhiwabon (or, in English, Blind Parry of Ruabon) was born in the Llŷn Peninsula, Caernarfonshire, now Gwynedd, in Wales, and was blind from birth.

His first patrons were the Griffiths family, of the Cefn Amwlch estate at Bryn Cynan near Nefyn, who provided the young Parry with a Welsh triple harp. He later became harpist to Sir Watkin Williams-Wynn at Wynnstay, Ruabon and became a master of the High Baroque. He lived on the Wynnstay estate but spent much of his time at the Williams-Wynn's London home where he performed on the Welsh triple harp for London's cultural elite. Parry became a member of the Royal Society of Musicians in 1763.

He inspired Thomas Gray to write his 1757 poem, The Bard. It is also claimed that Parry first wrote down – or dictated to his fellow-compiler Evan Williams – in his manuscript Antient British Music (1741) a then unnamed 'aria' which is now world-famous as "Deck the Halls with Boughs of Holly". It appears as "Nôs Calan" in British Harmony Being a Collection of Antient Welsh Airs The traditional Remains of those Originally Sung By the Bards of Wales "carefully compiled and now first published with some additional variations By John Parry Inscribed with all due Esteem and Gratitude to Sir Watkin Williams Wynn Bart." It was subsequently published and named "Nos Galan" (in English, "New Year's Eve") in Musical and Poetical Relicks of the Welsh Bards (1784) by Edward Jones.

Parry remained with the Williams-Wynn family until his death on 7 October 1782 at Ruabon. He was buried at Ruabon Parish Church on 10 October 1782.

John Parry's son, William Parry (1742–1791), was an accomplished artist. Many of his works, including portraits of his father, are held by the National Museum in Cardiff.

== Bibliography ==
- John Parry (c.1710–1782): Y Telynor Dall – The Blind Harper – by Huw Williams: Clwyd County Council (1982)
- Frank Kidson's contribution Welsh Music p.p. 492–501 of Grove's Dictionary of Music and Musicians Vol. V, T-Z, 1st edition 1910, ed. J.A. Fuller Maitland, London: Macmillan & Co. Ltd.
