= Daniel Solander =

Swedish botanist (1733–1782)

Daniel Solander FRS
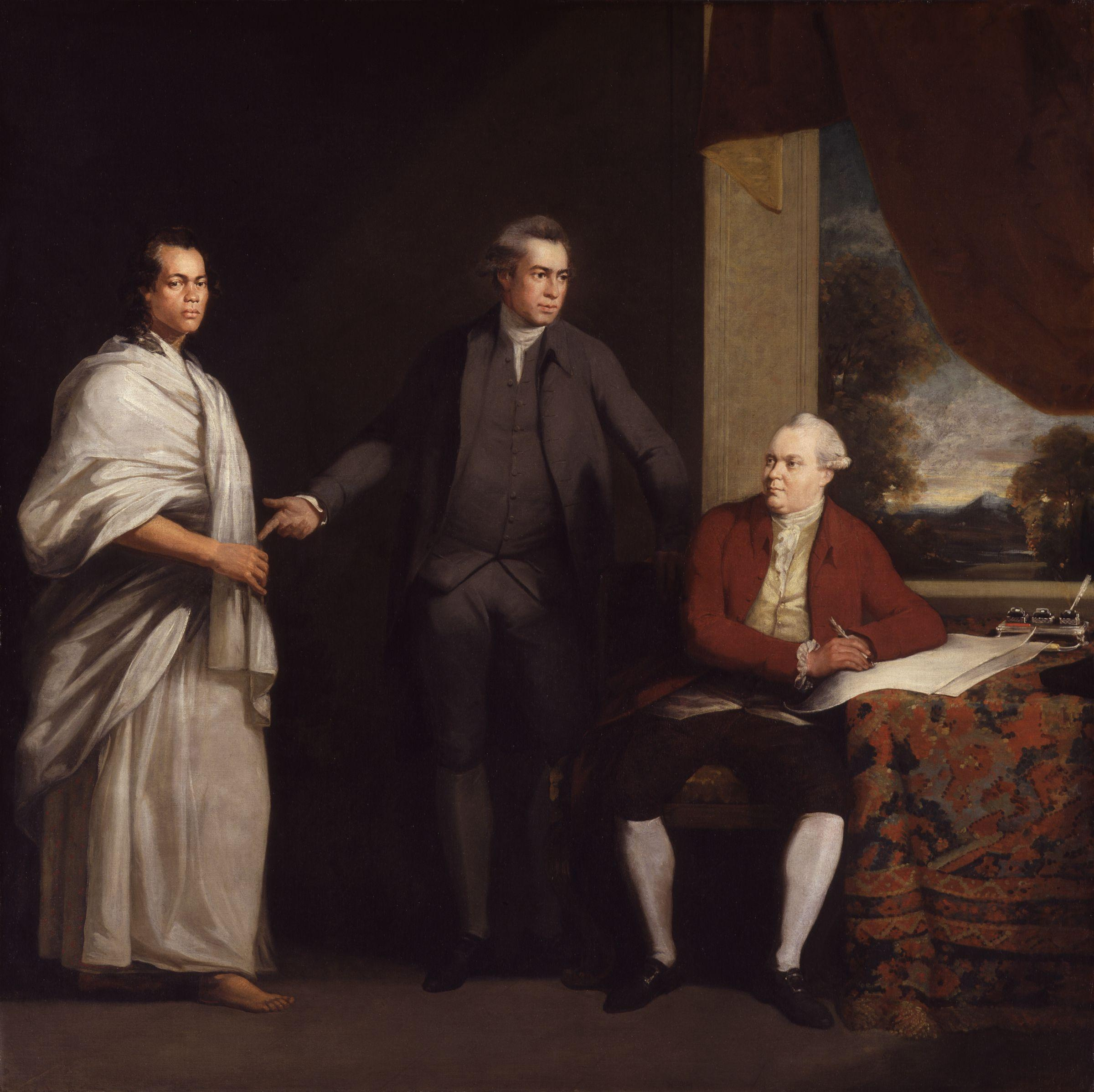
- Painting by William Parry made after Captain Cook's second voyage (c. 1775–1776). This depicts Omai, a Tahitian, Sir Joseph Banks and Daniel Solander (seated).
- Born: 19 February 1733; Piteå, Norrbotten, Sweden
- Died: 13 May 1782 (aged 49); London, England
- Education: Uppsala University
- Scientific career
- Fields: Botany; Zoology
- Author abbrev. (botany): Sol.

Daniel Carlsson Solander or Daniel Charles Solander (19 February 1733 – 13 May 1782) was a Swedish naturalist and an apostle of Carl Linnaeus.

In 1760 he moved to London, and from 1763 until his death worked at the British Museum, mostly cataloguing their botanical collections. They granted Solander him leave to accompany Joseph Banks on James Cook's first voyage to the Pacific Ocean aboard the Endeavour. Solander thus became the first university-educated scientist to set foot on Australian soil.

== Career ==
=== Education ===
Solander was born in Piteå, Norrbotten, Sweden, to Rev. Carl Solander a Lutheran principal, and Magdalena (née Bostadia). Solander enrolled at Uppsala University in July 1750 and initially studied languages, the humanities and law. The professor of botany was the celebrated Carl Linnaeus, who was soon impressed by young Solander's ability and accordingly persuaded his father to let him study natural history. Solander travelled to England in June 1760 to promote the new Linnean system of classification. In February 1763, he began cataloguing the natural history collections of the British Museum, and was elected a Fellow of the Royal Society in June the following year.

=== British Museum ===
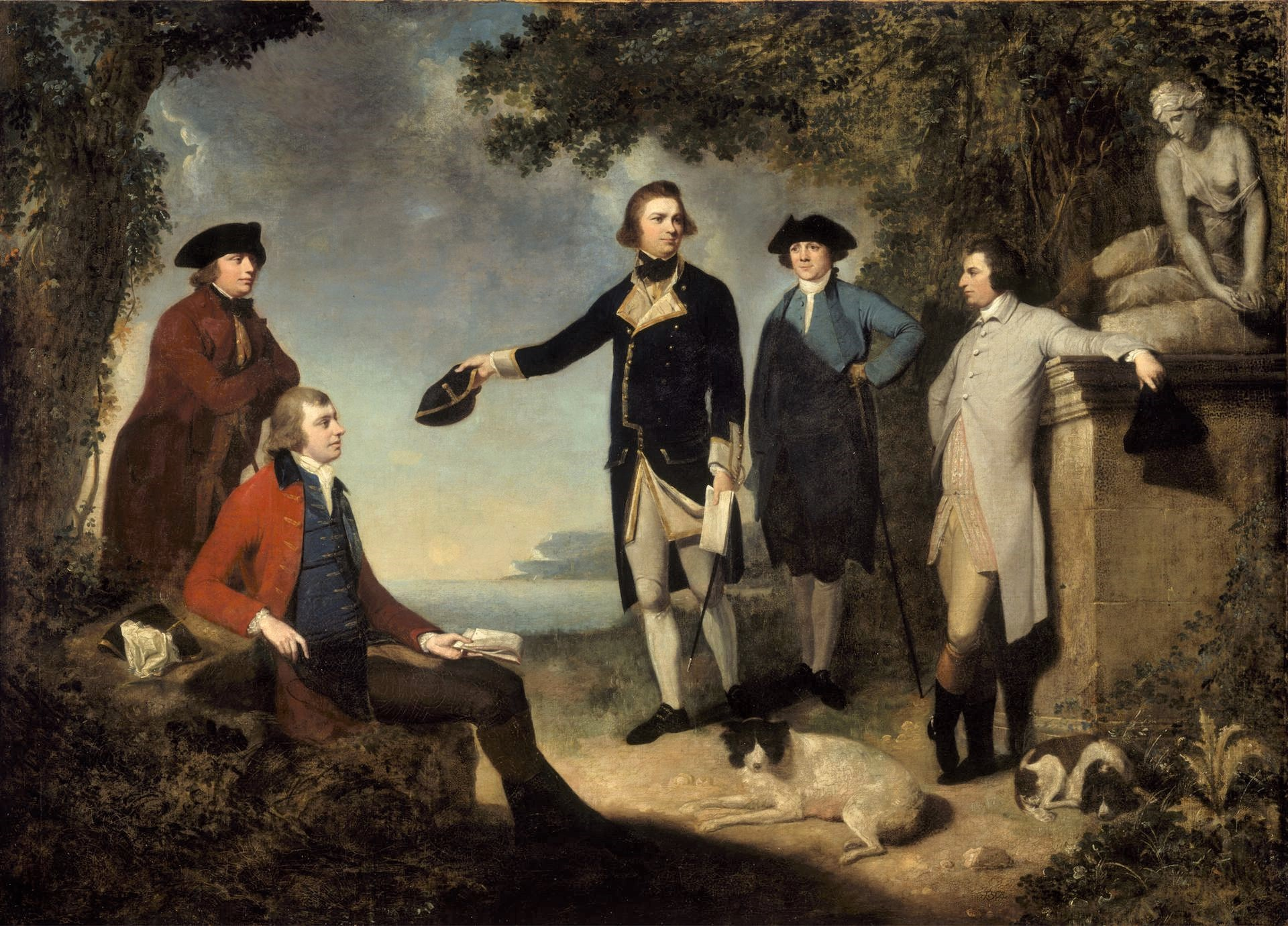
Dr Daniel Solander, Sir Joseph Banks, Captain James Cook, Dr John Hawkesworth and Lord Sandwich by John Hamilton Mortimer, 1771. Use a cursor to see who is who.

In 1768, Solander gained leave of absence from the British Museum and with his assistant Herman Spöring accompanied Joseph Banks on James Cook's first voyage to the Pacific Ocean aboard the Endeavour. They were the botanists who inspired the name Botanist Bay (which later became Botany Bay) for the first landing place of Cook's expedition in Australia. Solander helped make and describe an important collection of Australian plants while the Endeavour was beached at the site of present-day Cooktown for nearly seven weeks, after being damaged on the Great Barrier Reef. These collections later formed the basis of Banks' Florilegium.

Solander also wrote a manuscript describing all the species collected from New Zealand during the six months the 1768 expedition spent there. It was called Primitiae Florae Novae Zelandiae ('beginnings of a New Zealand flora'), and was to be illustrated with the plates prepared by Banks. It was never published, but it was available for study by anyone interested, first at Banks' London home, then at the Natural History section of the British Museum.

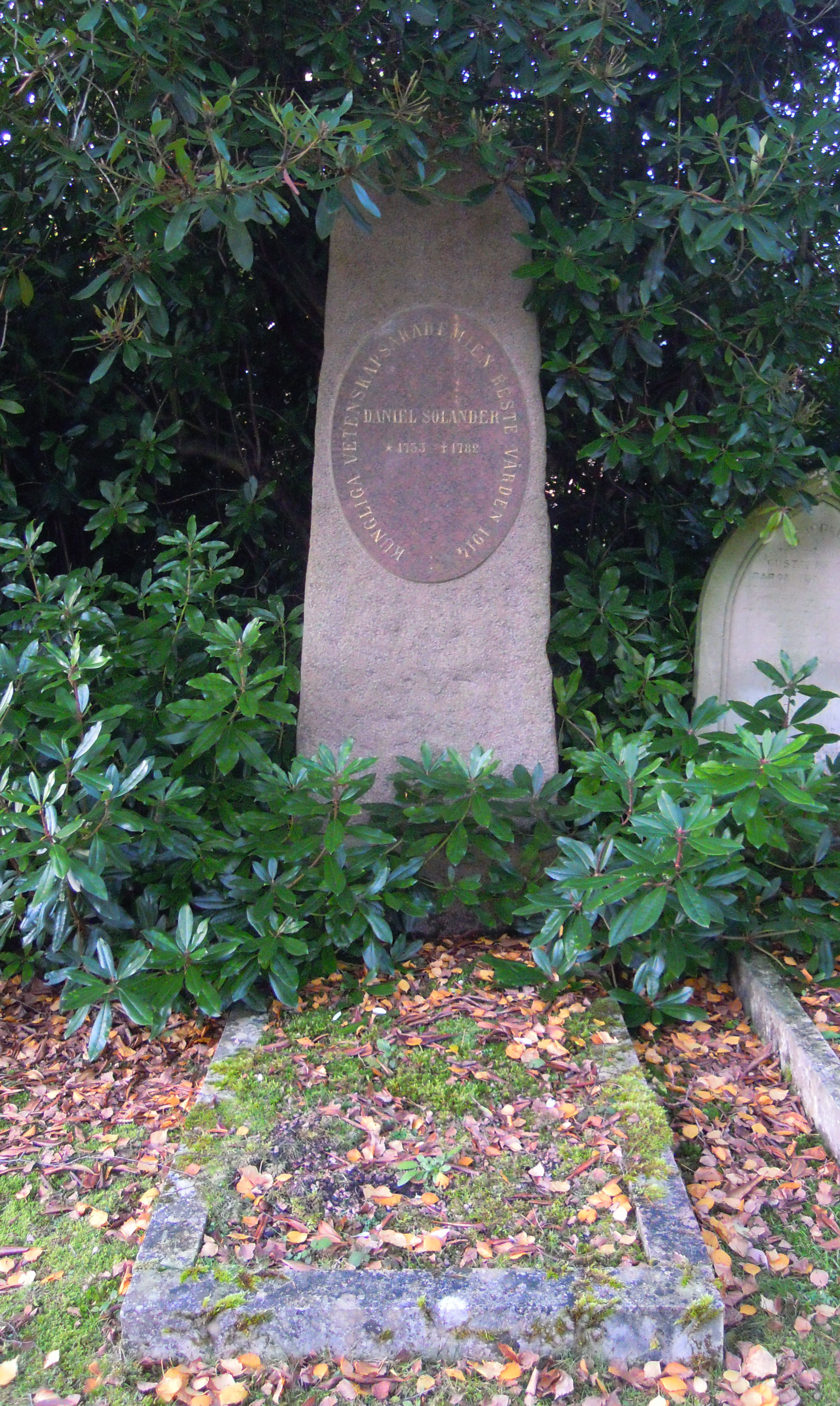
Solander's grave in Brookwood Cemetery

Solander's return to Britain with Cook and Banks made him the first Swede to circumnavigate the globe. On their return in 1771, Solander resumed his duties at the British Museum but also collaborated with Banks on the Florilegium. In 1772, he accompanied Banks on his voyage to Iceland, the Hebrides and the Orkney Islands. Between 1773 and 1782 he was Keeper of the Natural History Department of the British Museum. In 1773, he was elected a foreign member of the Royal Swedish Academy of Sciences.

Solander died at Banks' home in Soho Square of a stroke, aged 49, on 13 May 1782. An autopsy was performed the next day, and revealed a brain hemorrhage. He is buried in the Swedish Section at Brookwood Cemetery.

== Legacy ==
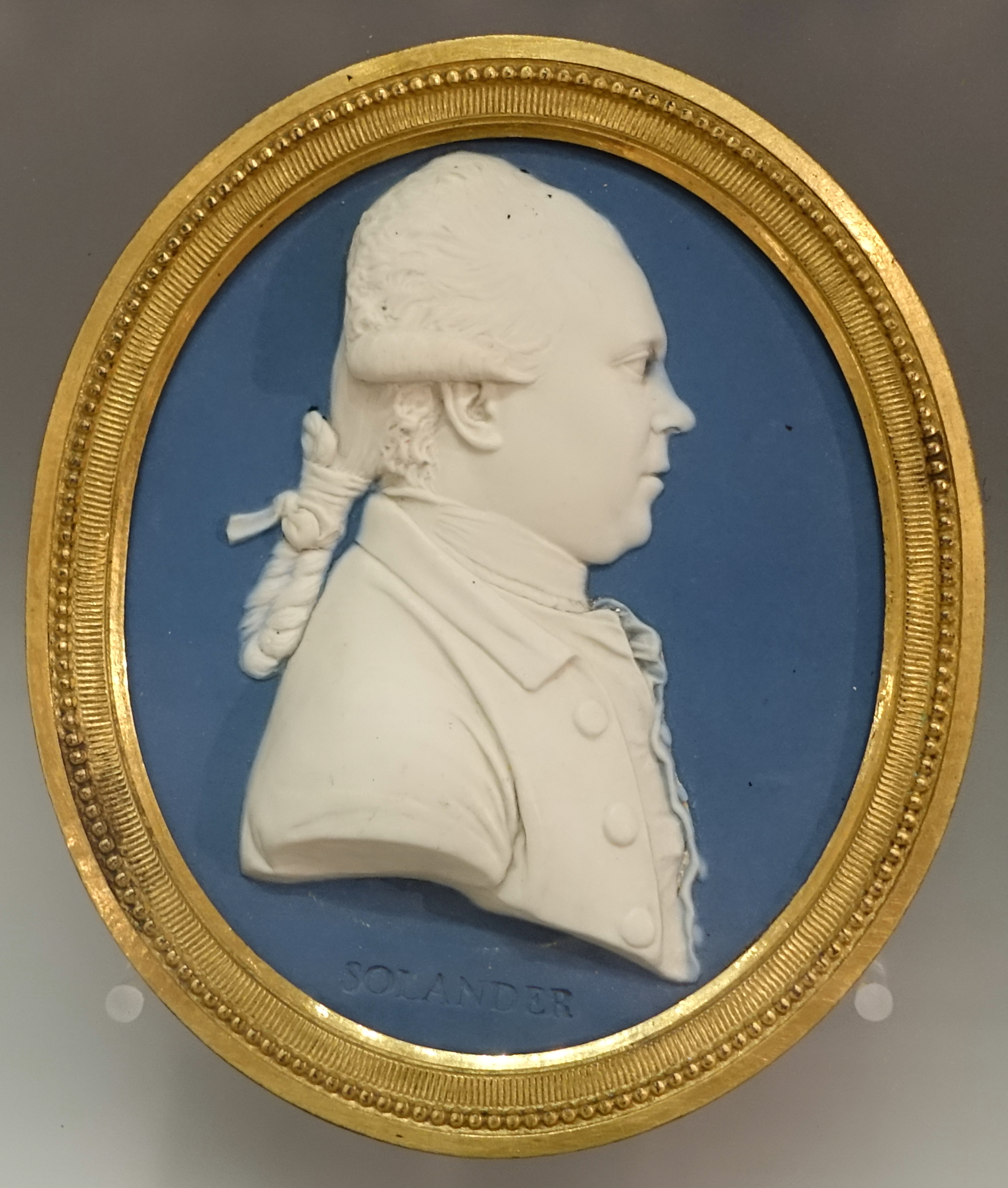
Solander, by John Flaxman Jr., c. 1778, Wedgwood jasperware

Solander's reputation has been profoundly influenced by his limited number of publications and his premature death. Although he had detailed descriptions prepared for most of the botanical specimens he collected on the Endeavour voyage, in deference to Joseph Banks, Solander held off publication waiting for the completion of over 700 engravings. However, after Solander's death, Banks, now President of the Royal Society, failed to publish his projected Florilegium. Had he done so, he would have secured Solander's posthumous reputation. It has been claimed that Banks treated Solander, and Jonas Dryander, as his servants rather than as botanists of equal standing to others in the botanical establishment. However, Banks clearly had a strong emotional bond with Solander, met his expenses and even supported his relatives in Sweden. In 1784, when he wrote to Johan Alströmer of Solander's death, Banks declared: 'This too early loss of a friend, whom I during my more mature years have loved and whom I will always miss, makes me wish to draw a veil over his death, as soon as I have ceased to speak of it. I can never think of it without feeling a mortal pain.' Solander remained an employee of the British Museum for the last decade of his life but was also paid by Banks to assist him with his collections. Banks' relationship with Robert Brown was more formal.

Solander invented the book-form box known as the Solander box which is still used in libraries and archives as the most suitable way of storing prints, drawings, herbarium materials and some manuscripts.

Solander Gardens in the east end of London is named after him, as are the Solander Islands off New Zealand's South Island and Cape Solander in the Kamay Botany Bay National Park, also in the suburb of Redfern near Sydney NSW the housing commission towers include a Daniel Solander building. Also Solander Island, off the NW coast of Vancouver Island, Canada. One of the many plants named in his honour is Fuscospora solandri (black beech). Solander was associated with Banks in Illustrations of the Botany of Captain Cook's Voyage Round the World, and his The Natural History of Many Curious and Uncommon Zoophytes, Collected by the late John Ellis, (1786) was published posthumously. The 'Daniel Solander Library' in Sydney's Royal Botanic Garden, established in 1852, is the oldest botanical research library in Australia.

The scientific name of the Providence Petrel, Pterodroma solandri, was given in his honour by ornithologist John Gould.

The shrub Banksia solandri is named after him. Herbarium specimens collected by Solander and Banks are cared for in herbaria, including at the National Herbarium of Victoria (MEL), Royal Botanic Gardens Victoria

In Solander's birth town Piteå, the Solander Science Park houses a number of cleantech companies and research organizations.

Solander Street in Pelican Waters (a suburb in the Sunshine Coast of south-east Queensland, Australia) is one of several nearby streets with names linked to the round-the-world voyage of Captain James Cook that landed at Botany Bay in 1770.

== See also ==
- European and American voyages of scientific exploration
