= 1806 in the United Kingdom =

Events from the year 1806 in the United Kingdom.

== Incumbents ==
- Monarch – George III
- Prime Minister – William Pitt the Younger (Tory) (until 23 January); William Grenville, 1st Baron Grenville (Coalition) (starting 11 February)
- Foreign Secretary – Henry Phipps, 1st Earl of Mulgrave (until 7 February) Charles James Fox (from 7 February) Charles Grey, Viscount Howick (from 24 September)
- Home Secretary – Lord Liverpool (until 5 February) Earl Spencer (from 5 February)
- Secretary of War – Lord Castlereagh (until 5 February) William Windham (from 5 February)

== Events ==
- 5 January – The body of Horatio Nelson, 1st Viscount Nelson, lies in state in the Painted Hall of Greenwich Hospital, London.
- 8 January – Battle of Blaauwberg: British infantry force troops of the Batavian Republic in the Dutch Cape Colony to withdraw.
- 9 January
  - The Dutch commandant of Cape Town surrenders to British forces. On 10 January, formal capitulation is signed under the Treaty Tree in Papendorp (modern-day Woodstock).
  - Lord Nelson is given a state funeral and interment at St Paul's Cathedral in London, attended by the Prince of Wales.
- 18 January – The Dutch Cape Colony capitulates to British forces, the origin of its status as a colony within the British Empire.
- 23 January – William Pitt the Younger dies aged 46 at Bowling Green House on Putney Heath of a gastrointestinal tract complaint and is succeeded as wartime Prime Minister by his cousin Lord Grenville.
- 6 February – Battle of San Domingo: The British Royal Navy gains a victory over the French off Santo Domingo.
- 11 February – Ministry of All the Talents formed by Grenville.
- 20 March – Construction begins of Dartmoor Prison, to house prisoners of war.
- 8 April – Proceedings for the impeachment of Henry Dundas, 1st Viscount Melville (on the initiative of Samuel Whitbread) for the misappropriation of public money at the Admiralty begin; he will be acquitted in the last impeachment trial ever held in the House of Lords.
- 16 May – The Order in Council of 16 May 1806 declares all ports from Brest (France) to the Elbe to be under a state of blockade by the Royal Navy.
- 4 July – Invasion of Naples (War of the Third Coalition): Battle of Maida in Calabria – British forces defeat the French.
- 7 July – Start of the first Gentlemen v Players cricket match (discontinued in 1963).
- 10 July – Vellore Mutiny, the first instance of a mutiny by the Indian sepoys against the British East India Company.
- 23 July – British invasions of the River Plate: A British expeditionary force of 1,700 men lands on the left bank of the Río de la Plata and invades Buenos Aires.
- 18 August – English seal hunter Abraham Bristow discovers the Auckland Islands.
- 7 October – Carbon paper patented by Ralph Wedgwood.
- 20 October – HMS Athenienne (1800) is wrecked in the Strait of Sicily with the loss of 347 of the 488 onboard.
- 29 October to 17 December – a General election sees Grenville continue as Prime Minister.
- 21 November – Napoleon's Berlin Decree initiates the Continental System, blocking the import of British manufactured goods to the rest of Europe.

=== Undated ===
- Supposedly secret 'Delicate Investigation' by senior statesmen into the life of Caroline of Brunswick, the Prince of Wales's estranged wife, finds "no foundation" for allegations against her morals.
- Annual British iron production reaches 260,000 tons.

=== Ongoing ===
- Anglo-Spanish War, 1796–1808
- Napoleonic Wars, 1803–1815

== Publications ==
- A New System of Domestic Cookery, 1st edition, "by A Lady" (Maria Eliza Rundell) published in London by John Murray.
- Rhymes for the Nursery by sisters Jane and Ann Taylor published in London, including Jane's "The Star" ("Twinkle, Twinkle, Little Star").

== Births ==
- 1 February – Jane Williams (Ysgafell), writer (died 1885)
- 6 March – Elizabeth Barrett Browning, poet (died 1861)
- 9 April – Isambard Kingdom Brunel, engineer (died 1859)
- 21 April – George Cornewall Lewis, statesman (died 1863)
- 4 May – William Fothergill Cooke, inventor (died 1879)
- 20 May – John Stuart Mill, philosopher (died 1873)
- 27 June – Augustus De Morgan, mathematician, logician (died 1871)
- 10 November – Alexander Milne, admiral (died 1896)
- 11 December
  - William Prowting Roberts, Chartist lawyer (died 1871)
  - Alfred Swaine Taylor, toxicologist, "father of British forensic medicine" (died 1880)

== Deaths ==
- c. January?? – Mungo Park, Scottish explorer (born 1771)
- 23 January – William Pitt the Younger, Prime Minister (born 1759)
- 19 February – Elizabeth Carter, writer (born 1717)
- 20 February – Lachlan McIntosh, Scottish-born American military and political leader (born 1725)
- 17 March – David Dale, Scottish philanthropist (born 1739)
- 23 March – George Pinto, composer (born 1785)
- 24 May – John Campbell, 5th Duke of Argyll, Scottish field marshal (born 1723)
- 10 July – George Stubbs, painter (born 1724)
- 13 September – Charles James Fox, statesman (born 1749)
- 22 October – Thomas Sheraton, furniture designer (born 1751)
- 23 November – Roger Newdigate, politician (born 1719)
- 29 December – Charles Lennox, 3rd Duke of Richmond, politician (born 1735)
