= Helen Taylor (writer) =

English writer of books for children

Helen Taylor (1818–1885) was an English writer of books for children.

== Biography ==
Helen Taylor was born in 1818, probably in London, to Elizabeth Venn, first wife of Martin Taylor (1788–1867), of Ongar, Essex; he was the son of Isaac Taylor, an engraver, some-time nonconformist pastor and, like Helen, a writer of children's books; his wife Ann was also an author. Her great-grandfather Isaac Taylor was also an engraver; her aunts Jane Taylor, who wrote the words to the song "Twinkle, Twinkle, Little Star", and Ann Taylor were both published poets. Other literary family members include her great-uncle Charles Taylor, and her uncle Jefferys Taylor.

Unlike her father, Helen appears to have been a member of the Church of England. Her works, which have echoes of those of her aunts, include:

- Sabbath Bells: a Series of Simple Lays for Christian Children (1844)
- Missionary Hymns, for the Use of Children (1846),
- The Child's Book of Homilies, by a Member of the Church of England (1844),

The Oxford Dictionary of National Biography offers the view that "her works have been generally obscured by the great outpouring of Sunday school literature in the middle of the nineteenth century as well as the fame of her aunts".

Helen Taylor died, unmarried on 25 June 1885 at Mayfield, Parkstone, Dorset.
