= Isaac Taylor (disambiguation) =

Isaac Taylor (1787–1865) was an English philosophical and historical writer, artist, and inventor.

Isaac Taylor may also refer to:

- Isaac Taylor (engraver) (1730–1807), English engraver, father of Isaac Taylor (1759–1829)
- Isaac Taylor (1759–1829), English engraver and writer, father of Isaac Taylor (1787–1865)
- Isaac Taylor (priest) (1829–1901), English philologist, toponymist, and Anglican canon of York, son of the writer
- Isaac H. Taylor (1840–1936), U.S. Representative from Ohio
- Isaac M. Taylor (1921–1996), American physician and academic
- Isaac S. Taylor (1850–1917), American architect in the midwestern United States
