= Ann Taylor (writer, born 1757) =

British writer (1757–1830)

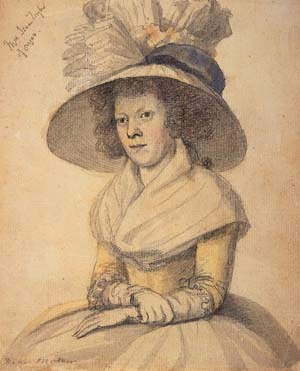
- Ann Taylor by Isaac Taylor c.1790
- Born: 20 June 1757; London
- Died: 27 May 1830 (aged 72); Ongar

Ann Taylor or Ann Martin (20 June 1757 – 27 May 1830) was a British writer. Her children were also notable writers and this included Ann and Jane Taylor.

== Life ==
Taylor was born in London in 1757. Her father, who died when she was a child, was an evangelical preacher. Her mother married again and her new siblings bullied her. She found respite writing satire and verse which gave her increased status among her school peers. Among those peers was Isaac Taylor and at Islington on 18 April 1781 she married him. They had eleven children and five survived to adulthood and to be noted writers.

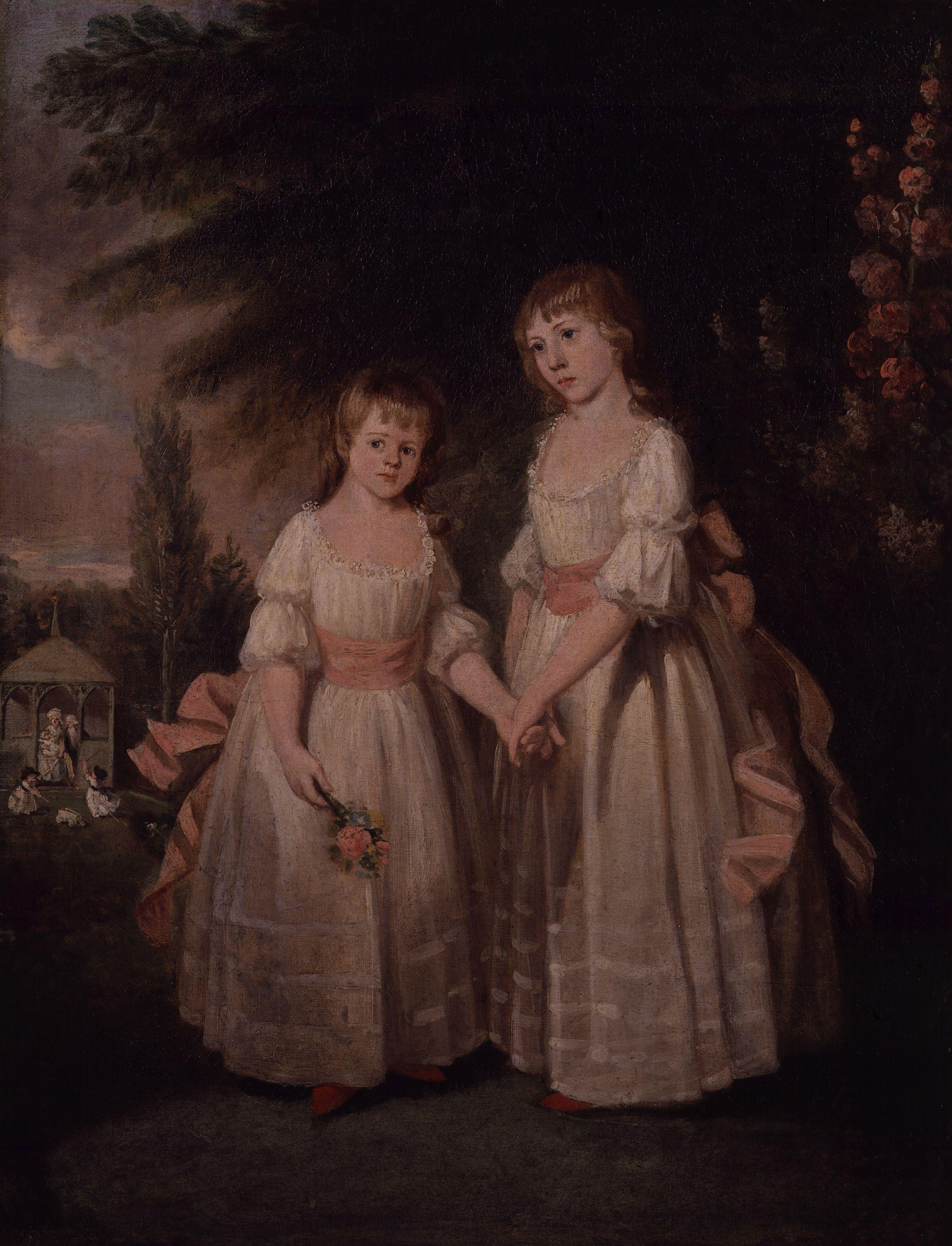
The Taylor family, painted by their father

- Ann born at Islington on 30 January 1782, who married Joseph Gilbert;
- Jane Taylor;
- two Isaacs who died in infancy;
- Isaac (1787–1865);
- Martin Taylor (1788–1867);
- Harriet, Eliza, and Decimus, who died in infancy;
- Jefferys;
- and Jemima (1798–1886), who married, on 14 August 1832, Thomas Herbert.

Ann's daughters Ann and Jane were unusually allowed to publish their work. The Quaker publisher had considerable success with their anonymous work and Ann senior was encouraged to offer her own work and a collaboration with Jane.

Taylor died and was buried in Ongar.

== Works ==
- Maternal Solicitude for a Daughter's Best Interests.
- Practical Hints to Young Females (1815)
- The Present of a Mistress to a Young Servant (1816)
- Reciprocal Duties of Parents and Children (1818)
- Correspondence between a Mother and her Daughter at School (with Jane) (1817)
- The Family Mansion (1819)
- Retrospection: a Tale (1821)
- The Itinerary of a Traveller in the Wilderness (1825)
