= Helen Taylor (disambiguation) =

Lady Helen Taylor (born 1964) is a member of the British Royal family, daughter of Katharine, Duchess of Kent and Prince Edward, Duke of Kent.

Helen Taylor may also refer to:

- Helen Taylor (actress) (1898–1990), sister of American actress, singer, and animal rights activist Estelle Taylor
- Helen Taylor (composer) (1915-1950)
- Helen Taylor (feminist) (1831–1907), English feminist, writer and actress
- Helen Taylor (writer) (1818–1885), English writer of books for children

== See also ==
- Helen Taylor Thompson (1924–2020), British aid worker
