= Dalton Smith (disambiguation) =

Dalton Smith (born 1992) is a Canadian ice hockey player.

Dalton Smith may also refer to:

- Dalton Smith (boxer) (born 1997), British boxer
- Edwin Dalton Smith (1800–1866/1883), British artist and botanical illustrator
