= Twelve Variations on "Ah vous dirai-je, Maman" =

1788 piano composition by W. A. Mozart

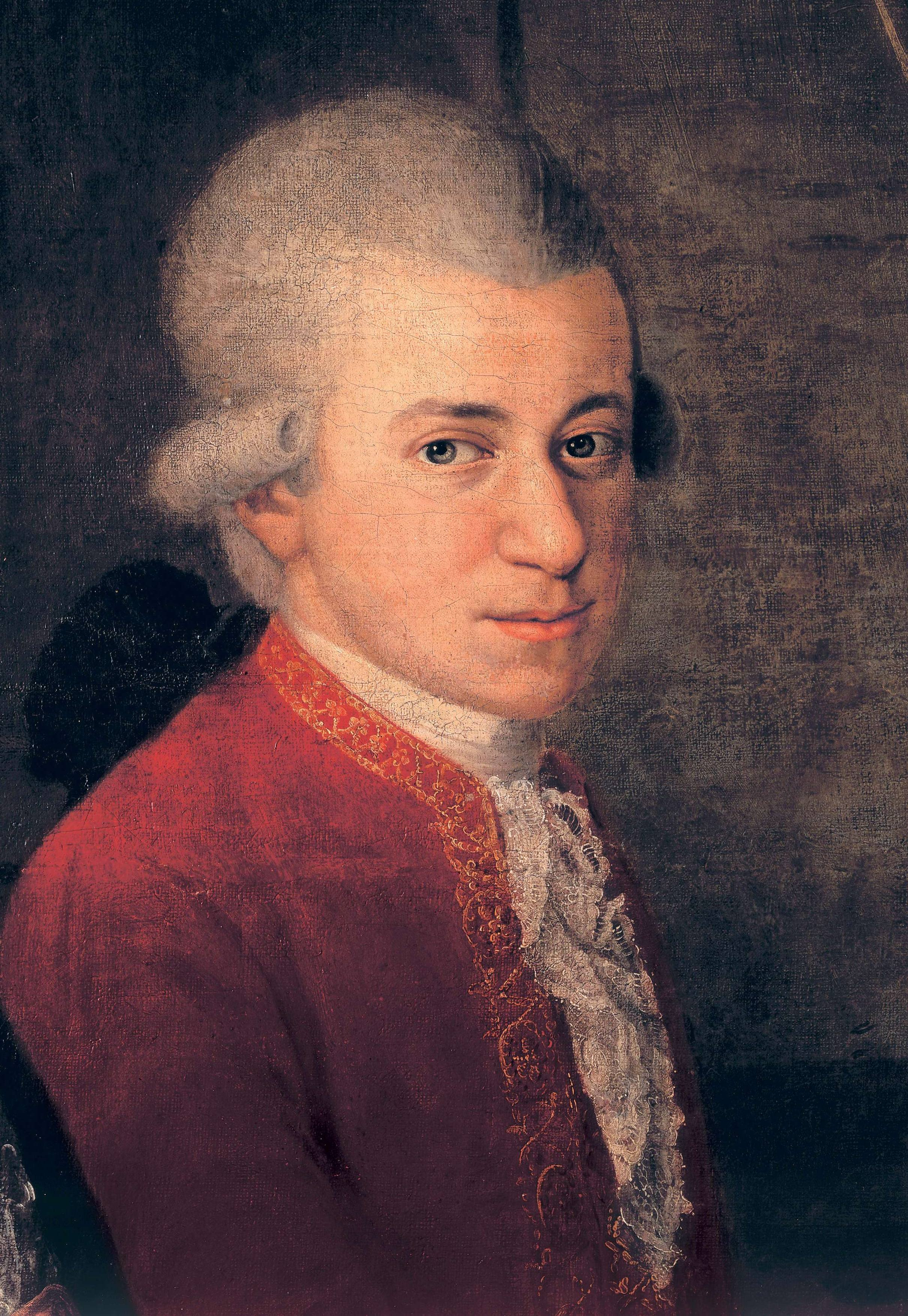
Detail of Wolfgang from the 1780–81 Portrait of the Mozart Family

Twelve Variations on "Ah vous dirai-je, Maman", K. 265/300e, is a composition for solo piano by Wolfgang Amadeus Mozart, composed when he was around 25 years old (1781 or 1782). This piece consists of twelve variations on the French folk song "Ah! vous dirai-je, maman". The French melody first appeared in 1761, and has been used for many children's songs, such as "Twinkle, Twinkle, Little Star", "Baa, Baa, Black Sheep", and the "Alphabet Song".

== Music ==
Performed by Stefano Ligoratti

Performed by Simone Renzi

MIDI rendition (11:51)

This work consists of the theme in an A–B–A form, each element in eight bars, and twelve variations, all in the time signature of 2/4, except the last in 3/4, and in the key of C major, except number 8 which is in C minor. Only the final two variations have tempo indications, Adagio and Allegro respectively. The twelfth variation recapitulates the previous variations and adds a 11-bar coda. The variations vary in rhythm, harmony and texture, and despite elaborate modification and ornamentation, the theme remains recognisable throughout.

== Composition date ==
For a time, it was thought that these variations were composed in 1778, while Mozart stayed in Paris from April to September in that year, the assumption being that the melody of a French song could only have been picked up by Mozart while residing in France. For this presumed composition date, the composition was renumbered from K. 265 to K. 300e in the chronological catalogue of Mozart's compositions. Later analysis of Mozart's manuscript of the composition by Wolfgang Plath rather indicated 1781/1782 as the probable composition date.

The variations were first published by Christoph Torricella in Vienna in 1785 as part of a collection of piano pieces by Mozart, including Twelve Variations on "La belle Françoise".
