= Joseph Henry Gilbert =

English chemist (1817–1901)

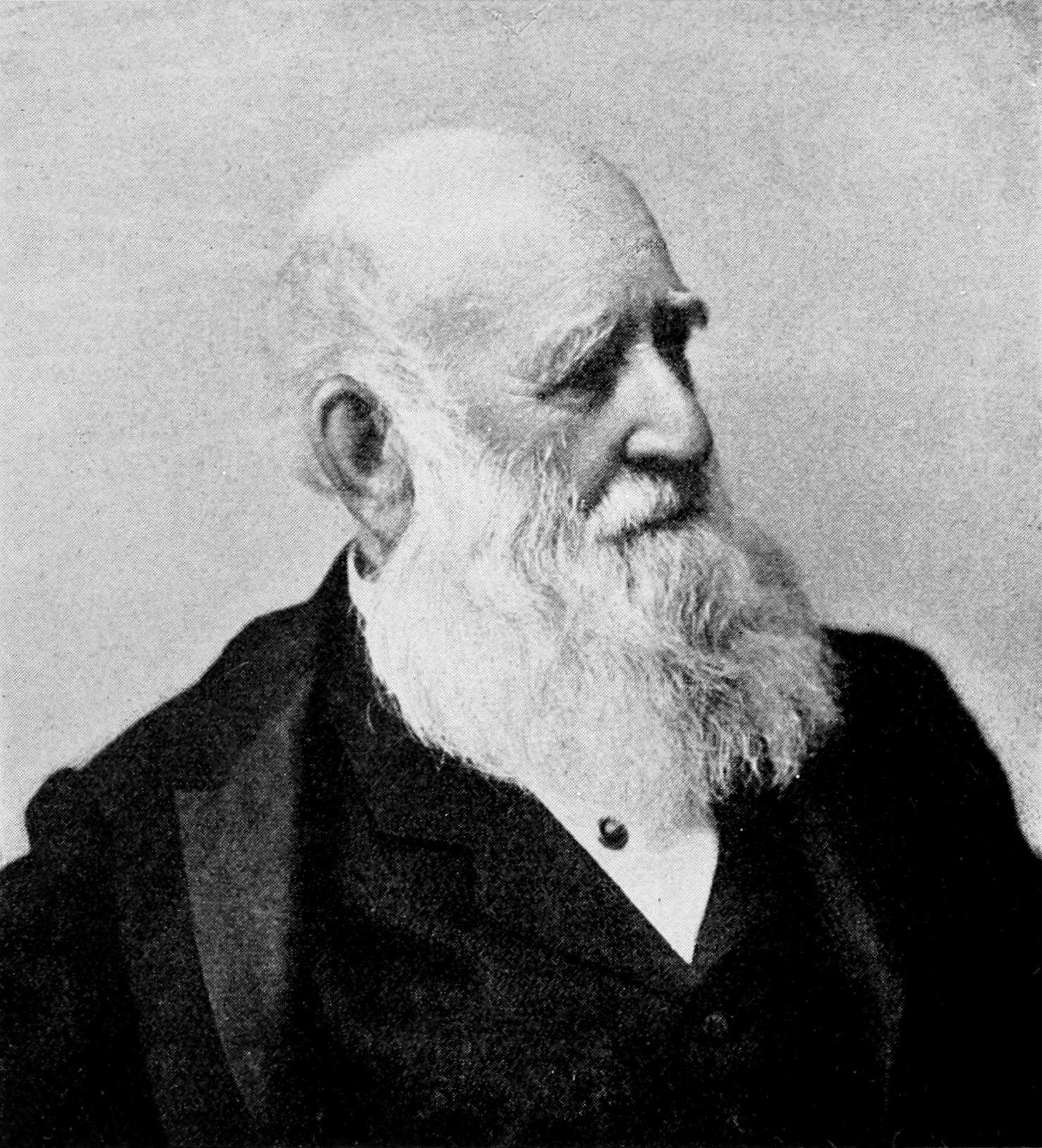
- Born: 1 August 1817; Hull
- Died: 23 December 1901 (aged 84)
- Awards: Royal Medal (1867)
- Scientific career
- Fields: chemistry

Sir Joseph Henry Gilbert FRS (1 August 1817 – 23 December 1901) was an English chemist, noteworthy for his long career spent improving the methods of practical agriculture. Along with J.B. Lawes, he conducted experiments at Rothamstead for forty years. One of the key findings of Lawes and Gilbert was that cereal crops took up nitrogen from the soil, contrary to the ideas of Justus von Liebig who held that it was obtained only from the air. Their work made Rothamstead a leading centre of agricultural research. Gilbert became a fellow of the Royal Society in 1860.

== Life ==
Gilbert was born at Hull, the son of clergyman Joseph Gilbert and Ann Gilbert. He went to school in Nottingham and Mansfield but this was interrupted when he lost sight in one eye following a shooting accident. At the age of 24 he entered university studying chemistry first at Glasgow under Thomas Thomson; then at University College, London, in the laboratory of Anthony Todd Thomson (1778-1849), the professor of medical jurisprudence, also attending Thomas Graham's lectures; he also studied German in order to pursue his doctorate at the University of Giessen under Justus von Liebig. On his return to England from Germany he acted for a year or so as assistant to his old master A. T. Thomson at University College, and in 1843, after spending a short time in the study of calico dyeing and printing near Manchester, accepted the directorship of the chemical laboratory at the agricultural experiment station established by John Bennet Lawes at Rothamsted, near St. Albans.

=== Lawes and Gilbert ===
Thomson recommended Gilbert to Lawes who wished to conduct studies on his estate in Rothamstead. Gilbert moved there in June 1843 and worked there until his death on 23 December 1901. Although much of the work went under both their names, the chemist who conducted most of the meticulous studies was Gilbert. The work which he carried out in collaboration with Lawes involved the application of chemistry, meteorology, botany, animal and vegetable physiology, and geology to the methods of practical agriculture.

Gilbert was elected a fellow of the Royal Society in 1860, and in 1867 was awarded a Royal Medal jointly with Lawes. In 1880 he presided over the Chemical Section of the British Association at its meeting at Swansea, and in 1882 he was president of the London Chemical Society, of which he had been a member almost from its foundation in 1841. For six years from 1884 he filled the Sibthorpian chair of rural economy at Oxford, and he was also an honorary professor at the Royal Agricultural College, Cirencester. He was knighted on 11 August 1893, the year in which the jubilee of the Rothamsted experiments was celebrated.

=== Personal life ===
Gilbert married Eliza Forbes Laurie in 1850 and after her death just two years later, he married Maria Smith in 1855. He had no children from either marriage.
