= Rhymes for the Nursery =

Rhymes for the Nursery is a collection of English poems by sisters Jane and Ann Taylor, published in London in 1806. The best-known poem in it is Twinkle, Twinkle, Little Star.
