= The ABC Song =

Song that teaches an alphabet

ABC Song
- by anonymous
- Genre: Folk
- Published: 1835 by Charles Bradlee

"The ABC Song" (Note: "The ABC Song" is also referred to as "Now I Know My ABCs", "The ABC", "ABC Song", "ABCs" /ˌeɪ.biːˈsiːz/ or "ABC" /ˌeɪ.biːˈsiː/, as well as "The Alphabet Song", "The Alphabet", "Alphabet Song" or "Alphabet".) is the best-known song used to recite the English alphabet in alphabetical order. It is commonly used to teach the alphabet to children in English-speaking countries. "The ABC Song" was first copyrighted in 1835 by Boston music publisher Charles Bradlee. The melody is from a 1761 French music book and is also used in other nursery rhymes like "Twinkle, Twinkle, Little Star", while the author of the lyrics is unknown. Songs set to the same melody are also used to teach the alphabets of other languages.

== History ==
The melody of "The ABC Song" was first published in the French book of music Les Amusements d'une Heure et Demy (transl. Amusements of an Hour and a Half) (1761) without lyrics. It was adapted in Mozart's Twelve Variations and used in many nursery rhymes around the world, including "Ah! vous dirai-je, maman", "Twinkle, Twinkle, Little Star" and later "Baa, Baa, Black Sheep", before being used in this song. The author of the lyrics is unknown.

"The ABC Song" was first copyrighted in 1835 by Boston music publisher Charles Bradlee under the title "The A.B.C., a German air with variations for the flute with an easy accompaniment for the piano forte." (Note: The alphabet song is sometimes said to come from another of Bradlee's publications, The Schoolmaster, but the first line of that song is given as "Come, come, my children, I must see", in Yale University's library catalog. It is described as "a favorite glee for three voices, as sung at the Salem glee club.") The melody was attributed to 18th-century composer Louis Le Maire.

"The ABC Song" is commonly used in preschools across English-speaking countries. The television series Sesame Street has covered the song many times, collaborating with popular artists such as Stevie Wonder, Katy Perry, Nina Simone and Usher.

Due to the speed at which 'L, M, N, O, P' is sung, it is possible for listeners to mistake these for a single letter "elemenopee". One variation avoids this by singing them evenly ('H-I-J-K-L-M-N, O-P-Q, R-S-T, U-V-W, X-Y-Z'), but has been criticized by fans of the original song, as it eliminates the end rhymes between G, P, V, and, in American English, Z.

== Composition and variations ==
Alphabet song
Tune for Alphabet song

Lyrics: (each line represents two measures, or eight beats)

A, B, C, D, E, F, G... (/eɪ biː siː diː iː ɛf dʒiː/)
H, I, J, K, L, M, N, O, P... (/(h)eɪtʃ aɪ dʒeɪ keɪ ɛlɛmɛnoʊ piː/; "L, M, N, O" spoken twice as quickly as rest of rhyme)
Q, R, S.../ T, U, V... (/kjuː ɑːr ɛs | tiː juː viː/; pause between S and T, though in some variants, "and" is inserted)
W... X.../ Y and(/&) Z. (/ˈdʌbəl.juː ɛks | waɪ ænd ziː/; pause between X and Y, and W and X last for two beats)
Now I know my ABCs.
Next time, won't you sing with me?

Lyrics for the alternate Zed version: (each line represents two measures or eight beats)

A, B, C, D, E, F, G... (/eɪ biː siː diː iː ɛf dʒiː/)
H, I, J, K, L, M, N... (/(h)eɪtʃ aɪ dʒeɪ keɪ ɛl ɛm ɛn/)
O, P, Q, R, S, T, U... (/oʊ piː kjuː ɑːr ɛs tiː juː/)
V, W... X, Y and(/&) Z. (/viː ˈdʌbəl.juː ɛks waɪ ænd zɛd/; W lasts for two beats)
Now I know my ABCs.
Next time, won't you sing with me?

=== Pronunciation of "Z" ===
In American English, the dialect in mind by the composer, the letter name for Z is pronounced /ziː/ (Zee), but in most other anglophone countries, the letter name is pronounced /zɛd/ (Zed). In such dialects, the absent Zee-rhyme is generally not missed, although while singing the song, some children may accommodate for Zee which they would otherwise not use on a regular basis. Variants of the song exist to accommodate Zed. One such variation is shown below:

a-b-c-d-e-f-g
h-i-j-k-l-m-n
o-p-q-r-s-t-u
v-w-x-y-z(ed)

This version does not have a closing line, and the tune is modified accordingly. The W is not lengthened in this version.

=== Backwards alphabet ===
Several versions exist covering the alphabet backward, i.e., Z to A. One version is shown below.

z-y-x and(/&) w
v-u-t, s-r-q
p-o-n-m-l-k-j
i-h-g-f-e-d-c-b-a
Now you know your ZYXs
I bet that's not what you expected!

The e-d-c-b-a part is as fast as the l-m-n-o-p part in the normal alphabet song.

=== Versions for other languages ===
The same melody used for "The ABC Song" has also been used for the Spanish, German, French, and Arabic alphabets. A French-language version of the song is also taught in Canada, with generally no alterations to the melody except in the final line that requires adjustment to accommodate the two-syllable pronunciation of the French y.

== See also ==
=== Traditional alphabet songs in other languages ===
- "A Haka Mana" recites the syllabary of the Māori language to the tune of "Stupid Cupid"
- "Alef-Bet" by Debbie Friedman, a song commonly used in American Hebrew school classrooms to teach the letters of the Hebrew alphabet
- "Iroha", a recital of the Japanese syllabary
- "Shiva Sutra", Sanskrit
- "Thousand Character Classic", Chinese and Korean Hanja
- "Tam thiên tự", Vietnamese
- "Ganada" (가나다), Korean Hangul
- "Zengő ABC" by Ferenc Móra, Hungarian
- "Adalama" (𞤀⹁ 𞤣𞤢⹁ 𞤤𞤢⹁ 𞤥𞤢... A, da, la, ma...), devised for Fulani speakers in West Africa to memorise the Adlam script.
- There are several recordings of the Cherokee syllabary with this melody.
- A singable version for memorising the Déné/Carrier syllabics chart.
