= Ah! vous dirai-je, maman =

French children's song

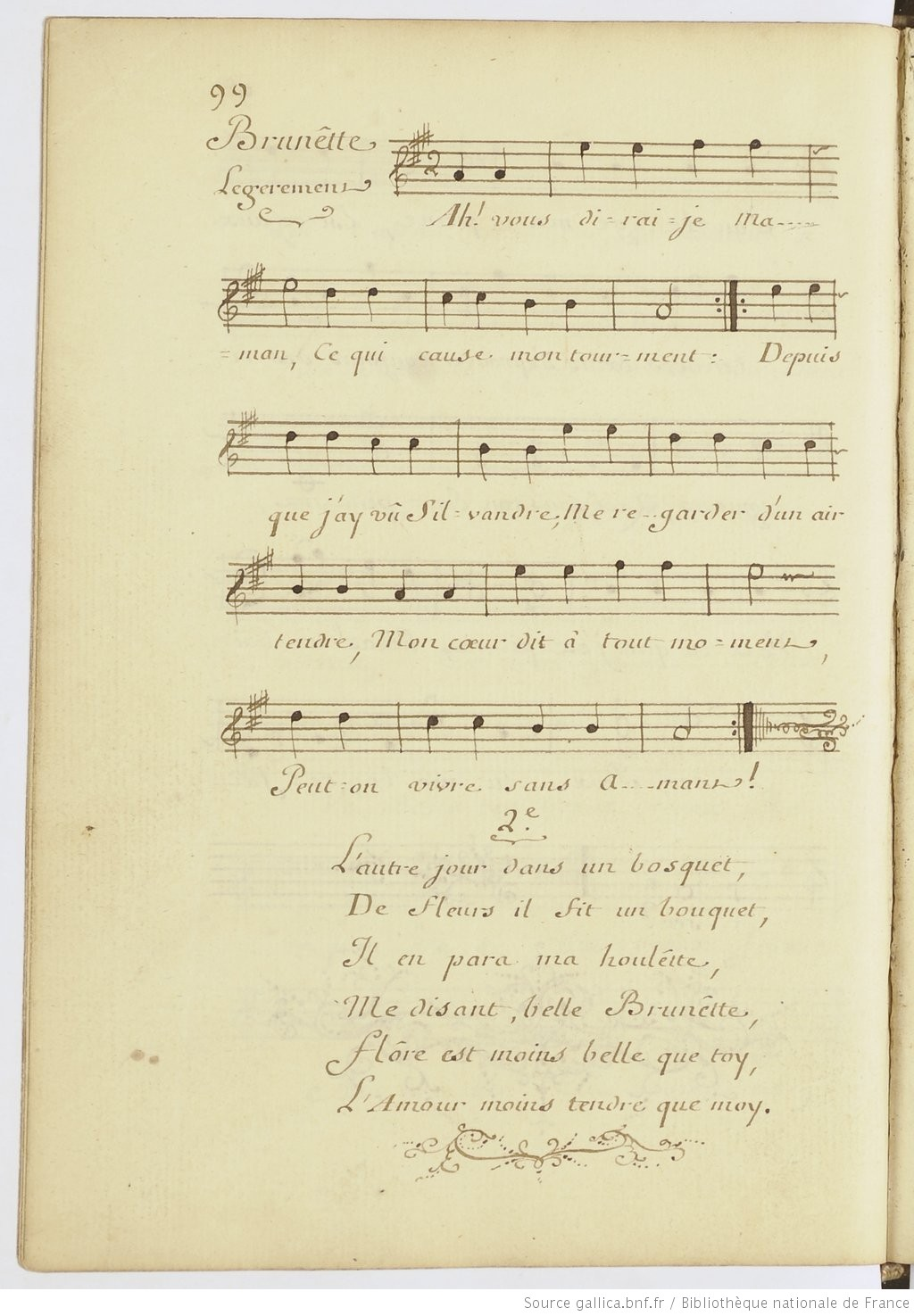
"Ah! vous dirai-je, maman"

"Ah! vous dirai-je, maman" (French: [a vu diʁeʒ(ə) mamɑ̃], English: Oh! Shall I tell you, Mama) is a popular children's song in France. Since its composition in the 18th century, the melody has been applied to numerous lyrics in multiple languages; the English song "Twinkle, Twinkle, Little Star" is one such example. It was also adapted in Twelve Variations on "Ah vous dirai-je, Maman" by Wolfgang Amadeus Mozart.

== History ==
According to Henri-Irénée Marrou, the origin of the melody is an anonymous pastoral song dating from 1740. The melody was first published in 1761. In 1774, the earliest known printed publication of the lyrics together with the music was in volume two of Recueil de Romances by M.D.L. (Charles de Lusse) published in Brussels (then in the Austrian Netherlands), under the title "La Confidence naïve".

== Nursery rhyme ==
The French lyrics of the nursery rhyme exist in several variations, of which the following one is one of the most common versions.

Ah ! Vous dirai-je maman
Ce qui cause mon tourment?
Papa veut que je raisonne
Comme une grande personne
Moi je dis que les bonbons
Valent mieux que la raison.

Oh! Shall I tell you, Mama,
What's causing my annoyance?
Daddy wants me to reason
Like an adult,
But I say that sweets,
Are worth more than reason!

== "La Confidence naïve" ==
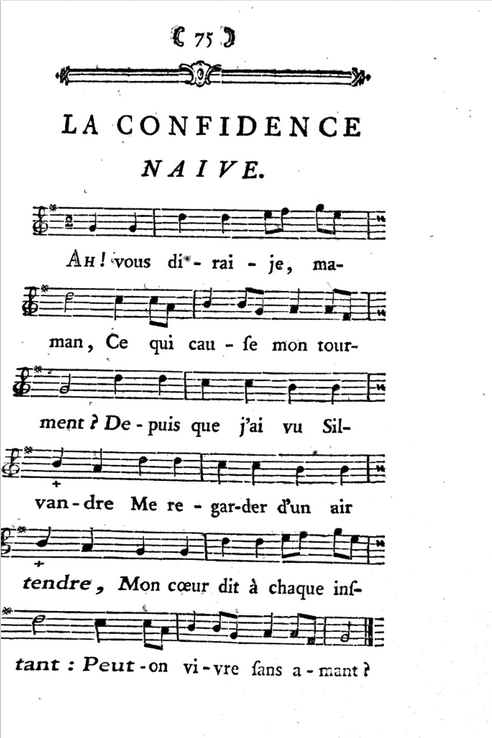
"La Confidence naïve"

The lyrics of the nursery rhyme are a parody of the original lyrics, an anonymous love poem, "La Confidence naïve" ("The naïve Confidence").

Ah ! vous dirai-je, maman,
Ce qui cause mon tourment ?
Depuis que j'ai vu Silvandre, (Note: Variations of the male lover's name found around the same time are Sylvandre, Lysandre, and Clitandre.)
Me regarder d'un air tendre;
Mon cœur dit à chaque instant :
"Peut-on vivre sans amant ?"

L'autre jour, dans un bosquet,
De fleurs il fit un bouquet;
Il en para ma houlette
Me disant : "Belle brunette,
Flore est moins belle que toi;
L'amour moins épris que moi.

Étant faite pour charmer,
Il faut plaire, il faut aimer;
C'est au printemps de son âge,
Qu'il est dit que l'on s'engage.
Si vous tardez plus longtemps,
On regrette ces moments."

Je rougis et par malheur
Un soupir trahit mon cœur.
Le cruel avec adresse,
Profita de ma faiblesse :
Hélas, maman ! un faux pas
Me fit tomber dans ses bras.

Je n'avais pour tout soutien
Que ma houlette et mon chien.
L'amour, voulant ma défaite,
Écarta chien et houlette;
Ah ! qu'on goûte de douceur,
Quand l'amour prend soin d'un cœur !

Ah! Shall I tell you, Mama,
What causes my torment?
Ever since I saw Silvandre
Look at me so tenderly,
My heart says every moment:
"Can we live without a lover?"

The other day, in a grove,
He made a bouquet of flowers;
He adorned my crook with it,
Telling me: "Beautiful brunette,
Flora is less beautiful than you;
Love less enamoured than me.

Being made to charm,
One must please, one must love;
It's in the spring of one's age
That it is said one should commit.
If you delay much longer,
One regrets these moments."

I blushed and unfortunately
A sigh betrayed my heart.
The cruel one skillfully
Took advantage of my weakness:
Alas, Mama! a misstep
Made me fall into his arms.

I had nothing to support me
But my crook and my dog.
Love, wanting my defeat,
Put aside my dog and crook;
Ah! That we taste sweetness,
When love takes care of a heart!

== Appearances of the melody ==
Melody

Many songs in various languages have been based on the "Ah! vous dirai-je, maman" melody. In English, "Twinkle, Twinkle, Little Star", the "Alphabet Song" and "Baa, Baa, Black Sheep" all use this melody.

The German Christmas carol "Morgen kommt der Weihnachtsmann" with words by Hoffmann von Fallersleben, also uses the melody, as does the Hungarian Christmas carol "Hull a pelyhes fehér hó", the Dutch "Altijd is Kortjakje ziek", the Spanish "Campanita del lugar", the Greek "Φεγγαράκι μου λαμπρό", the Turkish "Daha Dün Annemizin" and the Swedish "Blinka lilla stjärna".

Many classical compositions have been inspired by this tune:

- Wolfgang Amadeus Mozart, Twelve Variations on "Ah vous dirai-je, Maman" (K. 265 / K. 300e) (1781 or 1782)
- Georg Joseph Vogler, Variations on "Ah! vous dirai-je, Maman"
- Michel Corrette (Variations on) "Ah! Vous dirais-je, maman" from La Belle Vielleuse (1783)
- Johann Christoph Friedrich Bach, Variations on "Ah vous dirai-je maman" in G major (Wf XII: 2) (BR A 45) (Composed around 1785/90; 1st publ. ca. 1880)
- Jean-Baptiste Cardon (1760–1803), Variations for harp on "Ah! vous dirai-je, maman"
- Ferdinando Carulli, (1770–1841) Three Solos with Variations for Guitar, Op. 60, No. 3, c. 1812
- Theodor von Schacht (1748–1823), 3rd movement (Allegretto con variazioni) of his clarinet concerto in B flat major
- Franz Liszt, Album Leaf: "Ah! vous dirai-je, maman" (1833) (S.163b)
- Christian Heinrich Rinck, Variations and finale for organ on "Ah! vous dirai-je, maman", op. 90 (pub. 1828)
- Adolphe Adam, Bravura Variations from the opera Le toréador (1849)
- Camille Saint-Saëns, The Carnival of the Animals (1886), 12th movement (Fossiles) quotes the tune
- Ernst von Dohnányi, Variations on a Nursery Tune, Op. 25 (1914)
- Erwin Schulhoff, Ten Variations on "Ah! vous dirai-je, maman" and Fugue, Op. 16 (1914)
- Harl McDonald, Children's Symphony, 2nd theme of 1st movement ("Baa, Baa, Black Sheep" variant) (1948)
- Xavier Montsalvatge, 3rd movement (Allegretto) of Sonatine pour Yvette (1962)
- Vashti Bunyan, "Lily Pond" on the 1970 album Just Another Diamond Day
- José Luis Turina, Variations & Theme (on the Theme and variations "Ah, vous dirai-je, maman!" by Wofgang Amadeus Mozart, for violin and piano (1990), arranged for two pianos in 2008
- Jerry Goldsmith, I.Q. (film) (1994)
- John Corigliano, The Mannheim Rocket (2000)
