= Anker Smith =

English engraver

- Born: 1759; Cheapside, London, England
- Died: June 23, 1819 (aged 59–60)
- Occupation: Engraver

Anker Smith (1759–1819) was an English engraver.

== Life ==
Smith was born in Cheapside, London, where his father was a silk merchant. He was educated at Merchant Taylors' School, and at first articled to an uncle named Hoole, a solicitor; but he transferred to James Taylor, an engraver and younger brother to Isaac Taylor, with whom he remained until 1782. Subsequently, he became an assistant to James Heath, and then one of the leading English line engravers.

Smith died of apoplexy on 23 June 1819.

== Works ==
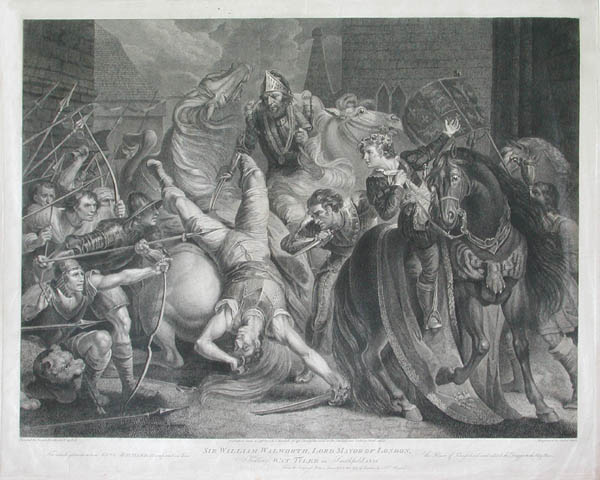
Sir William Walworth, Lord Mayor of London, Killing Wat Tyler in Smithfield, 1381, engraving by Anker Smith published 1796

In 1787 Smith found his first independent employment with John Bell, for whose series of British Poets he engraved many of the illustrations. Through his relative John Hoole he became known to John Boydell, who commissioned him to engrave James Northcote's picture Death of Wat Tyler; the print was published in 1796, and earned for him election as an associate of the Royal Academy in the following year.

In 1798 Smith executed a large plate from Leonardo da Vinci's cartoon of the Holy Family in the possession of the Academy. For the rest of his life Smith worked on illustrations to fine editions of standard works, such as:

- Thomas Macklin's Bible, 1800;
- Boydell's "Shakespeare" (the smaller series), 1802;
- George Kearsley's "Shakespeare", 1806;
- Robert Bowyer's edition of David Hume's History of England, 1806; and
- John Sharpe's British Classics.

He engraved many of Robert Smirke's designs for the Arabian Nights, 1802; Gil Blas, 1809; and Don Quixote, 1818; and was one of the artists employed on the official publication Ancient Marbles in the British Museum. His last work was a large plate from Thomas Heaphy's picture, The Duke of Wellington giving Orders to his Generals, which he did not live to complete.

== Family ==
Smith married in 1791, and left a widow, one daughter, and four sons, including the sculptor Frederick William Smith and the painters Herbert Luther Smith and Edwin Dalton Smith. His sister Maria, who was an artist, and exhibited portraits between 1791 and 1814, married William Ross, a miniature-painter, and was the mother of William Charles Ross.

== Notes ==
Attribution

This article incorporates text from a publication now in the public domain: Lee, Sidney, ed. (1898). "Smith, Anker". Dictionary of National Biography. Vol. 53. London: Smith, Elder & Co.
