= Polly Flinders =

Mid 20th century American clothing brand

Polly Flinders was a brand name of children's clothing, popular in the 1950s, 1960s, and 1970s, and known for their hand-smocking. Polly Flinders was the brain child of Richard Baylis and Merritt Baylis, two brothers from Cincinnati who were stationed in Washington, D.C., during World War II. The young men spent their free time in the Library of Congress researching post-war economies and trying to plan for their futures. They concluded that population booms inevitably followed large wars and decided to create a business that could capitalize on a post-war Baby Boom. A woman in their apartment building sewed the hand-smocked little girls dresses, which were hugely popular with friends, family, and neighbors. The Baylis brothers bought their neighbors design and went into business for themselves.

Baylis Brothers was founded in Cincinnati in 1946 and eventually became a tradename for the brothers' corporation. Their market research proved accurate and Polly Flinders dresses became immensely popular with parents and grandparents of Baby Boomers.

The company grew and eventually became a The Baylis Brothers Co., a Delaware corporation. It had a large headquarters and factory building at 224 East Eighth St., Cincinnati, Ohio. Eventually, the company began shipping the parts for the dresses to Barbados to be sewn at much lower labor rates than Ohio workers.

The dresses were available at major chain outlets, including Sears. Although Polly Flinders dresses no longer exist, dresses of a similar style are made by many manufacturers and the style remains popular.

On April 22, 1969, the Baylis brothers sold their company to a major conglomerate, U.S. Industries, Inc., which after rapid growth in the 1960's found itself divesting assets in the 1980's. At the time of the sale, The Baylis Brothers Co., changed its name to T.B.B. Co. and transferred substantially all its assets to U.S. Industries.

The Baylis brothers continued to manage the business for some years but eventually retired.

Polly Flinders is also the name of a child referenced in a 19th-century British nursery rhyme named "Little Polly Flinders" where its tune varies, with one can be the same as and a faster version of "Baa, Baa, Black Sheep".
