= Grant Johannesen =

American pianist (1921–2005)

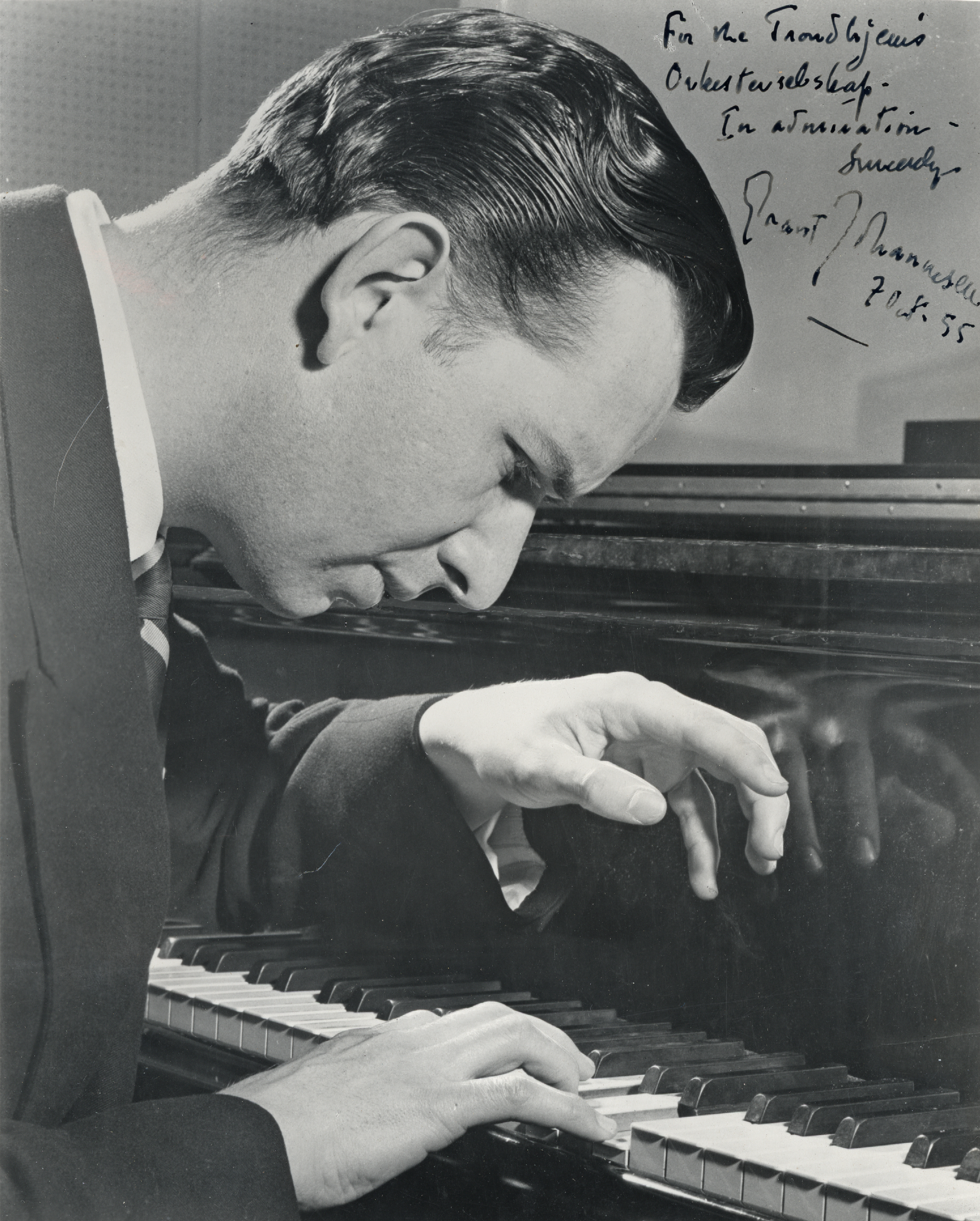
Grant Johannesen Credit: Olaf T. Ranum

Grant Johannesen (July 30, 1921 – March 27, 2005) was an American pianist.

== Biography ==
Johannesen was born in Salt Lake City and discovered at the age of five by a teacher who lived across the street. He imitated whatever he heard her play, and she did not appreciate it.

He studied with Robert Casadesus, Egon Petri, Roger Sessions, and Nadia Boulanger. He made his Manhattan recital debut when he was 23, and won the Concours International when he was 28.

He toured extensively, both with the New York Philharmonic under Dimitri Mitropoulos, and as a solo performer. His performances in Moscow were especially well received. He was once encored 16 times.

He was known as an interpreter of French piano music and recorded the complete piano works of Gabriel Fauré.

He served as director of the Cleveland Institute of Music from 1974 to 1985. He was a frequent soloist with both the Cleveland Orchestra and the Utah Symphony.

He was a National Patron of Delta Omicron, an international professional music fraternity. He was awarded an honorary doctorate of music degree from the Hartt School, University of Hartford in 1993.

Johannesen was married to the Juilliard-trained composer Helen Taylor (whose works for piano were among his recordings) from 1943 until her death in an automobile accident in 1950. He was married to his second wife, the cellist Zara Nelsova (with whom he sometimes performed), from 1963 until their divorce in 1973. From his first marriage, he had a son, David Johannesen.

He died in 2005 at the age of 83 in Germany, where he had been visiting friends. The New York Times reported that he died "near Munich" and another source said "near Garmisch in Bavaria." In their obituaries, the Salt Lake Tribune and the Associated Press, citing his lifelong friend Elisabeth von Rummelhoff, reported that he died in Berlin. The Mormon Artists Group (directed by Glen Nelson), with which he was a collaborator, also announced that he died in Berlin.

After his death, David Johannesen completed the manuscript of Grant Johannesen's autobiography, wrote its foreword, and worked together with Peter DeLafosse at the University of Utah Press to shepherd the book "Journey of an American Pianist" through its publication in 2007.

Johannesen was a member of The Church of Jesus Christ of Latter-day Saints.
