= Edwin Dalton Smith =

British artist and botanical illustrator

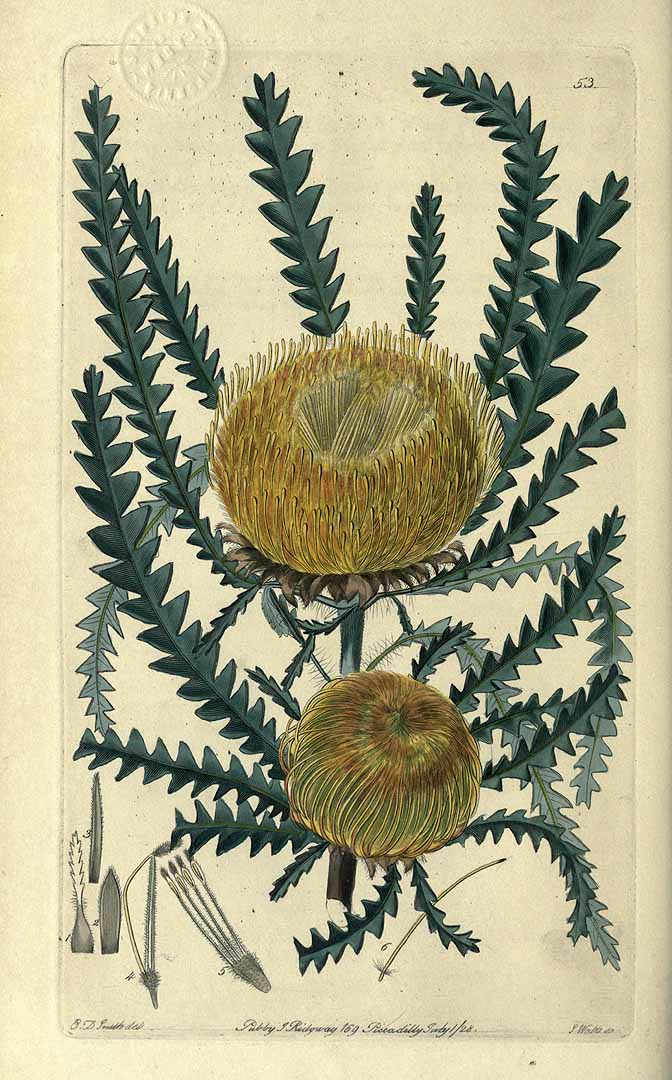
Dryandra formosa from Flora Australasica (1827–1828)

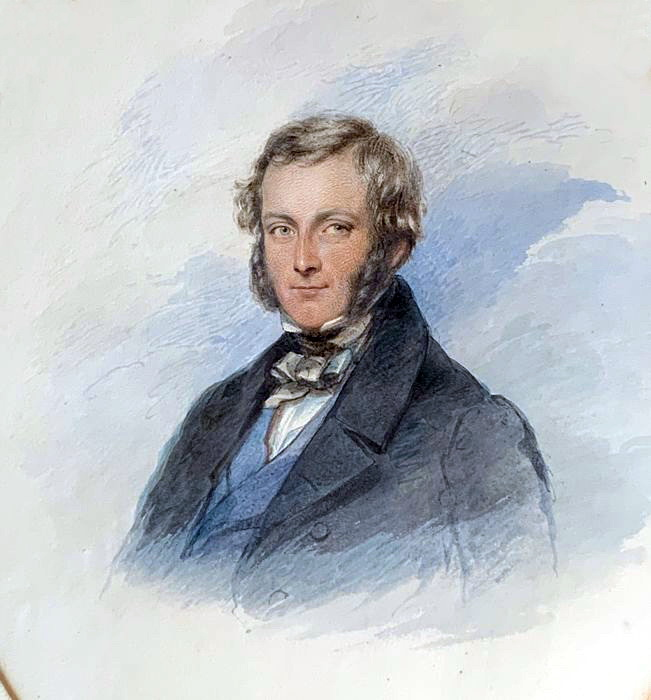
Portrait of a Gentleman

Edwin Dalton Smith (1800–1866/1883), was an English artist and engraver, a painter of portraits and a botanical illustrator. His father was the engraver Anker Smith (1759–1819) and his home was in Chelsea, London. Most of his work was exhibited during the period 1816–47 – some 66 of his works were displayed at the Royal Academy and another 13 at the Suffolk Street galleries.

He worked for a while on Robert Sweet's Flower Garden, and had his art published in several works, such as Geraniaceae and Flora Australasica. He also produced illustrations for Benjamin Maund's Botanic Garden. For many years he was associated with the Royal Botanic Gardens, Kew.

Smith's studio was located at 69 East Street, Brighton (1869–1872), and his residence in 1871 was at 11 Rose Hill Terrace, Brighton.
