= Jefferys Taylor =

Jefferys Taylor was a member of a dynasty of writers and artists who flourished in the first half of the 19th century. He was born on 30 October 1792 and died on 8 October 1853

== Life and work ==
Jefferys Taylor was the youngest son of Isaac Taylor by his wife, Ann Martin, and was born at Lavenham. Soon after his birth, he was pictured as a nursling in his mother's arms in the background of his father's painting of the family, now in the National Portrait Gallery, London. He was educated under his father as an engraver and apprenticed at Lavenham. Possessed of considerable ingenuity, he eventually profited from the invention of a machine for engraving parallel lines.

Many of his brothers and sisters became writers, and Jefferys followed them, particularly as a children's author. His subjects were varied and distinguished by humour and fancy. His first novel, Harry's Holiday or the doings of one who had nothing to do (London, 1818), went through several editions. Two centuries on, its unsentimental view of childhood has been perceived as a forerunner of Lord of the Flies. His next publication was self-illustrated and in verse, Æsop in Rhyme, with some originals (London, 1820), and also saw many editions. Other books were deliberately educational and included The Little Historians: a new Chronicle of the affairs of England in church and state in three volumes (London 1824); Parlour Commentaries on the Constitution and Laws of England (London, 1825); The Forest, or rambles in the woodland (London, 1831); and The Farm, a new account of rural toils and produce (London, 1832). Some of these also carried his own illustrations and were published in the U.S. as well.

On 20 June, 1826, Jefferys married Sophia Mabbs, by whom he had a son, Edward, who died young. He himself died at Broadstairs as the result of a stroke on 8 October, 1853.
