= Helen Taylor (composer) =

American composer (1915-1950)

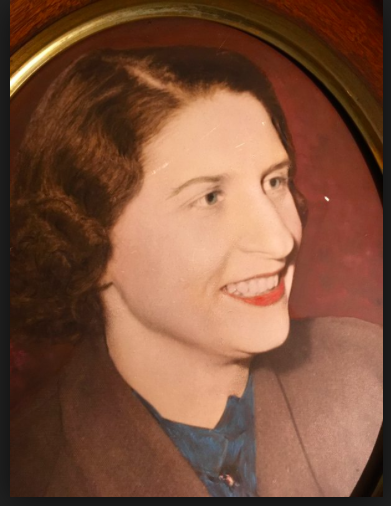
- Born: August 24, 1915
- Died: 5 October 1950 (aged 35)

Helen Taylor Johannesen (August 24, 1915—October 5, 1950) was an American composer.

== Biography ==
Helen Taylor, who died in 1950, was a Juilliard-trained composer and the wife of pianist Grant Johannesen.

Taylor grew up in Salt Lake City. She studied piano at the McCune School of Music. She received her BM from the University of Utah in 1937, her MM from Columbia Teachers College in 1941, and her degree in composition from Juilliard in 1945, where she completed a three-movement symphony. She worked at the Martha Graham Dance Company as a composition pianist and worked with Aaron Copland on "Appalachian Spring." In this role, she honed her skills as an improviser. In 1948, her violin sonata was recognized with a National Association of Composers and Conductors Award.

She was killed in an auto collision.

== Helen Taylor Johannesen Scholarship ==
Taylor's sister, Beverly Sorensen, established the Helen Taylor Johannesen Memorial Endowed Scholarship at Brigham Young University. The scholarship supports a music composition major by paying for their tuition and lesson fees.

== Recordings ==
In 2001 and 2007, pianist Grant Johannesen recorded his wife's music in two albums: "Discovering Helen Taylor" and "Discovering Helen Taylor 2." They include recordings of Taylor's Symphony, piano music, and chamber music.
