= Joseph Gilbert (minister) =

English Congregational minister

Joseph Gilbert (1779–1852) was an English Congregational minister.

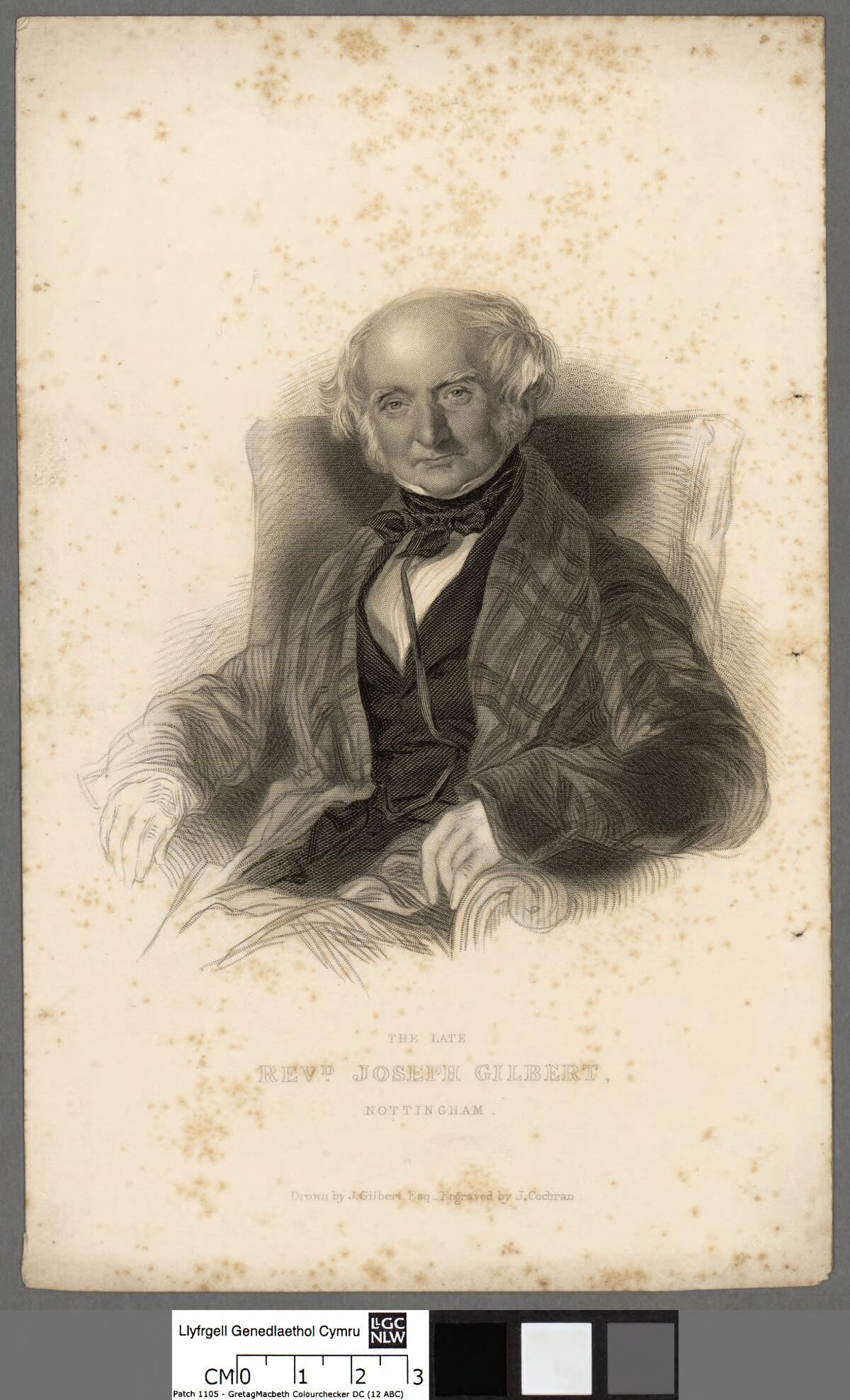
painter and engraver

== Life ==
Born in the parish of Wrangle, Lincolnshire, on March 20, 1779, he was son of a farmer who had come under the influence of John Wesley. After receiving some education at a nearby free school, he was apprenticed to a general shopkeeper at Burgh. On the expiration of his term he became assistant in a shop at East Retford, Nottinghamshire, of which he in time became proprietor. Here he began to associate with a group of Congregationalists, for whom he sometimes preached.

In 1806 he gave up business and entered Rotherham College. His college course finished, he became minister at Southend, Essex. After a residence of eighteen months there he was appointed classical tutor in Rotherham College. On 8 December 1818 he was ordained pastor of the Nether Chapel, Sheffield, still retaining the tutorship, spending the Sundays and Mondays in Sheffield and the rest of the week at Rotherham.

In July 1817 he became minister of Fish Street Chapel, Kingston upon Hull. In November 1825 he removed to James Street Chapel, Nottingham. A new meetinghouse was built for him in April 1828 in Friar Lane, Nottingham, and in this he ministered from then on. His health giving way, he resigned his charge in November 1851, and he died on Sunday, 12 December 1852 at the age of 73.

== Works ==
In 1808, at the request of Dr. Edward Williams, Principal of Rotherham College, he published his first book, a reply to a work by the Rev. William Bennet, entitled Remarks on a recent Hypothesis respecting the Origin of Moral Evil, in a Series of Letters to the Rev. Dr. Williams, the author of that Hypothesis. During his pastorate at Hull, he published a Life of Dr. Williams (1825).

In 1835 he delivered in London the course of Congregational lectures by which he was best known, entitled 'The Christian Atonement, its Basis, Nature, and Bearings, or the Principle of Substitution illustrated as applied in the Redemption of Man’ (London, 1836).

He published also, during his Rotherham tutorship, a sermon on ‘The Power of God in the Soul of Man.’ After his death one of his sons issued ‘Recollections of Discourses’ which he preached in the years of 1848–50, with ‘A Biographical Sketch’ by his widow prefixed (1853).

== Family ==
He was twice married, in May 1800 to Miss Sarah Chapman, daughter of a surgeon at Burgh, and in December 1813 to Ann Taylor, eldest daughter of the Rev. Isaac Taylor of Ongar. They had seven children, including the eldest son Josiah Gilbert (1814–1892) who became an artist, and Joseph Henry Gilbert.
