= Charles Taylor (engraver) =

English engraver

Charles Taylor (1756–1823) was an English engraver, known also as a man of letters and biblical scholar.

== Life ==
Born in the parish of Shenfield in Essex on 1 February 1756, he was the son of Isaac Taylor by his wife, Sarah Hackshaw, daughter of Josiah Jefferys of Shenfield. He was educated at a grammar school at Brentwood in Essex, and on completing his fifteenth year was articled to his father as an engraver, and studied under Francesco Bartolozzi. In 1777 he visited Paris.

Taylor went into business in London as an engraver. In 1780 his house was burnt down during the Gordon riots, and he moved to Holborn. Later he lived in Hatton Garden, where he died on 13 November 1823, and was buried in Bunhill Fields.

== Works ==
Taylor initially adopted the standard practice for engravers, of executing ornamental proofs. These were for the most part after Robert Smirke and Angelica Kauffman. His main artistic publications were:

- Picturesque Beauties of Shakespeare, London, 1783; the illustrations were by Thomas Stothard and Smirke, engraved with his brother Isaac Taylor.
- Picturesque Miscellanies, 1785.
- The Cabinet of Genius, London, 1787.
- The Artist's Repository or Drawing Magazine, London, 1788.
- The Elegant Repository and New Print Magazine, London, 1791.
- Elegant Historical Engravings, London, 1791.
- The Landscape Magazine, London, 1791–3.
- The Shakespeare Gallery, London, 1792.

A self-portrait, from about 1774, went to Braeside, Tunbridge Wells, the home of Henry Taylor, son of Isaac Taylor, and Charles Taylor's great-nephew.

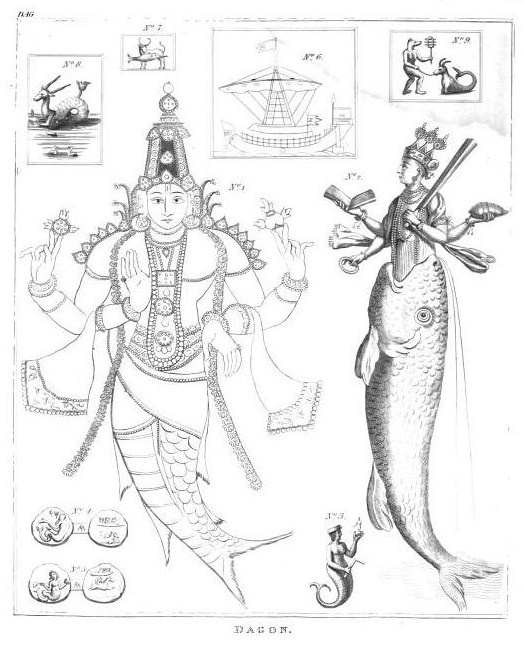
Illustrations of Dagon from Scripture Illustrated by means of Natural Science (1814) by Charles Taylor

In later life Taylor devoted concentrated on a revision of Antoine Augustin Calmet's Dictionary of the Bible, which he began to publish anonymously in 1797. It sold well, but Taylor called himself only the publisher and the engraver of some of the plates. There was a fourth edition by 1824, and the work of revision occupied Taylor during the rest of his life. After his death he was acknowledged to be the editor. He was also the author of:

- The General Genteel Preceptor, London, 2nd edit., 1797.
- A Familiar Treatise on Drawing for Youth, London, 1815.
- Facts and Evidences on the Subject of Baptism, London, 1815.
- A Familiar Treatise on Perspective, London, 1816.
- The Baptist Self-convicted, London, 1819.

Taylor edited the Literary Annual Register, London, 1808, afterwards merged in the Literary Panorama, and translated the Adventures of Telemachus (London, 1792) from Les Aventures de Télémaque of François Fénelon.

== Family ==
In 1777 Taylor married Mary Forrest, niece of Cornelius Humphreys, chaplain of the Tower, by whom he had a son, Charles (1780–1856), and two daughters, Mary and Sarah.

== Notes ==
Attribution

This article incorporates text from a publication now in the public domain: Lee, Sidney, ed. (1898). "Taylor, Charles". Dictionary of National Biography. Vol. 55. London: Smith, Elder & Co.
