= Isaac Taylor (priest) =

English historian and theologian (1829–1901)

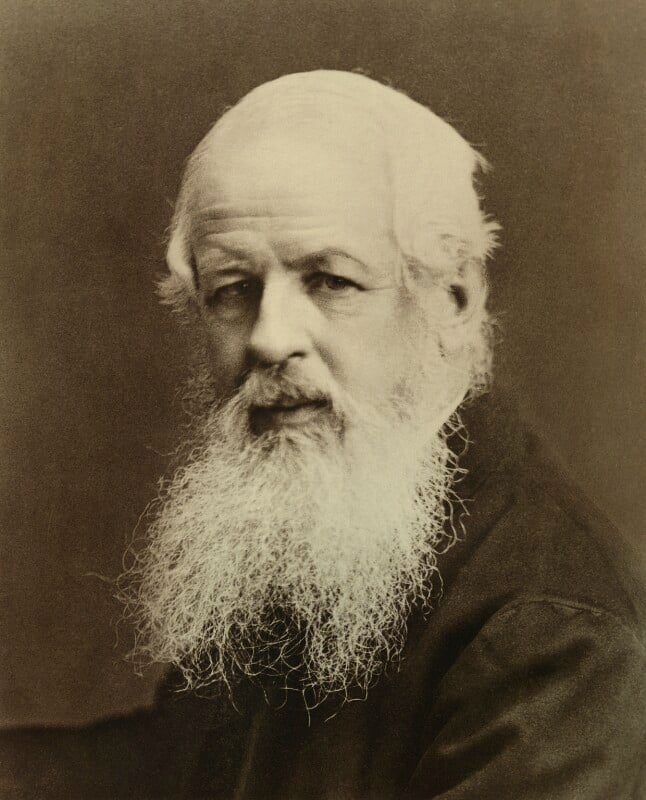
Taylor in the 1890s

Isaac Taylor (2 May 1829 – 18 October 1901), son of Isaac Taylor, was a philologist, toponymist, and Anglican canon of York (from 1885).

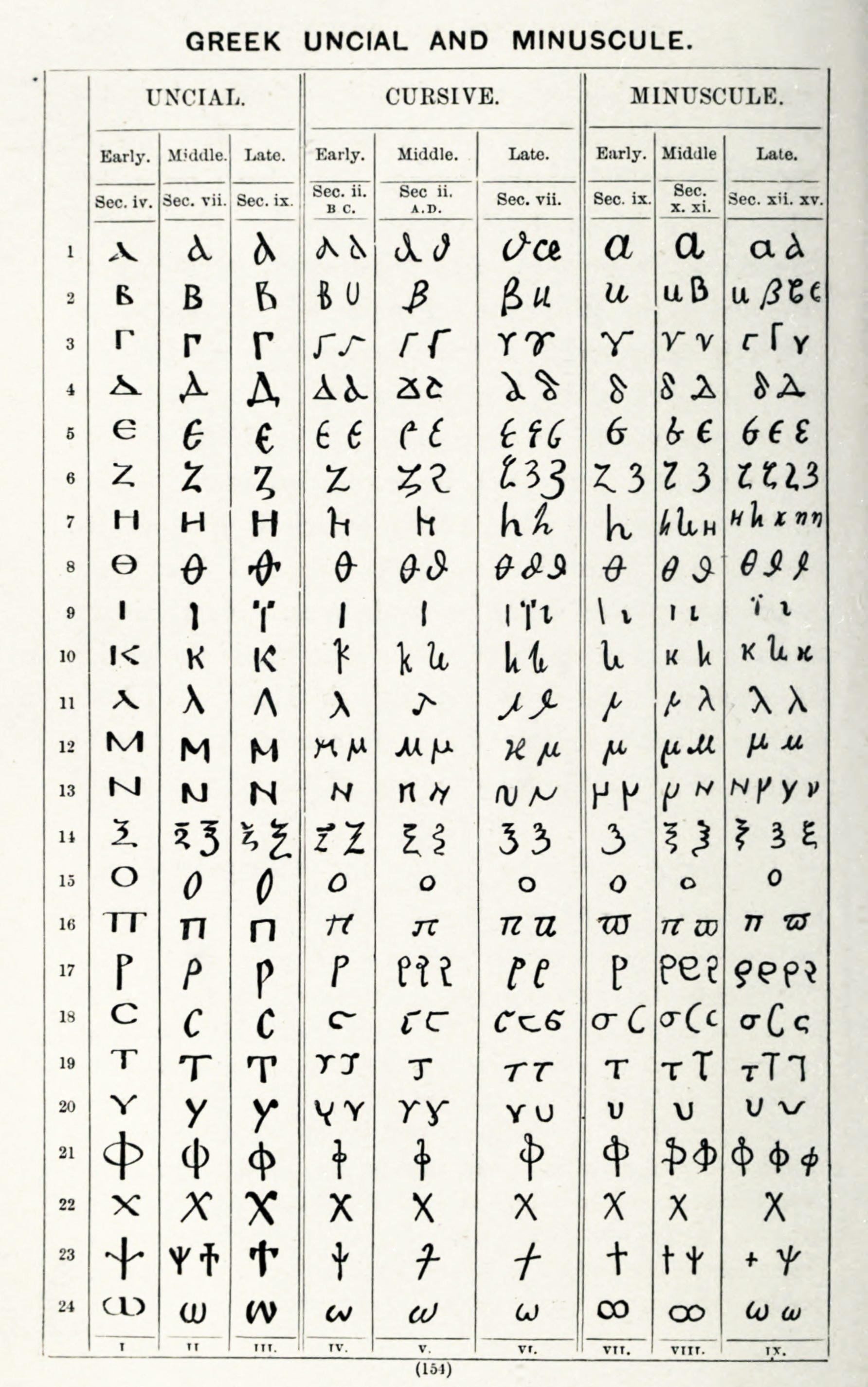
A page from Taylor's The Alphabet showing the development of different variants of Greek letters

== Life and family ==
Taylor was ordained a priest, and served as rector of Settrington. He was Canon of York Minster from 1885 until his death.

His daughter Elizabeth Eleanor Taylor married in January 1903 Ernest Davies, son of the Rev. Robert Davies, Rector of the Old Church, Chelsea.

== Writing and ideas ==
Though he wrote several inflammatory theological pamphlets, such as The Liturgy and the Dissenters (1860) and Leaves from an Egyptian Notebook (1888), he is chiefly remembered today for his archaeological and philological studies, which include Words and Places (1864), Etruscan Researches (1874), The Alphabet (1883), and Greeks and Goths (1879), in which he argued that the runes were derived from a variety of the Hellenic alphabet used in the Greek colonies on the Black Sea about the 6th century B.C. "It would seem that the Goths, who then occupied the region between the southern coast of the Baltic and the upper waters of the Dnieper," Taylor argued in a subsequent paper, "must have obtained a knowledge of the art of writing from the merchants of Olbia and other Greek colonies on the Euxine, who, according to Herodotus, voyaged forty days' journey to the North by the great trade route of the Dnieper."

Taylor's ideas concerning religion raised many eyebrows amongst his contemporaries. In 1887, he argued that Islam had been more successful than Christianity in "civilizing" Africa and ridding the "Dark Continent" of cannibalism, devil worship, human sacrifice, witchcraft, infanticide, and bad hygiene. Cheers followed not Taylor's lecture—made to a British audience primarily of Anglican missionary supporters—but the remarks made by the speakers who followed him and denounced his theories. In the same address, delivered to the Wolverhampton Church Congress in 1887, Taylor argued that "Islam, above all, is the most powerful total abstinence society in the world; whereas the extension of European trade means the extension of drunkenness and vice, and the degradation of the people." Ultimately, Taylor's comments were made based upon the racist assumptions of Islamicist controversialists, including the famous traveller and writer Richard Burton that the lower races were better adapted to respond to the message of Islam than that of Christianity.

In 1890, Taylor published Origin of the Aryans, in which he proposed the "round-head theory," in which he argued that European Russia was the homeland of all of the Indo-European peoples, in opposition to the assertion of Max Müller, who had argued for Central Asia. Taylor believed that the Celts (tall stature, round heads), a branch of the ancient Finns, were the only true Aryans who had "Aryanized" the Iberians (short stature, long heads), the Scandinavians (tall stature, long heads), and the Ligurians (short stature, round heads).

In regards to the origin of the Basques, Taylor believed that they were direct descendants of the Etruscans. Taylor’s theories on the Etruscans, though now obsolete, caused great interest at the time that they were presented. He believed that the Etruscan language belonged to the Altaic language group, and that Etruscan mythology was fundamental to that presented in the Kalevala, the great Finnish epic.

In his The Origin of the Aryans (1892), concerning Lithuanians, Taylor wrote that:

"Thus it would seem that the Lithuanians have the best claim to represent the primitive Aryan race, as their language exhibits fewer of those phonetic changes, and of those grammatical losses which are consequent on the acquirement of a foreign speech."

In his Names and Their Histories (1898), Taylor presented an impressive survey of local, foreign, and national names. Though many of his toponymic theories have been discounted, he laid the groundwork for future research in this then-new discipline.

== Sources ==
- Chisholm, Hugh, ed. (1911). "Taylor, Isaac (philologist)" . Encyclopædia Britannica. Vol. 26 (11th ed.). Cambridge University Press.
- Jessica Powers, "Christianity vs. Islam in Africa: A 19th Century Debate," Islam for Today, August 28, 2000
- Thomas Prasch, “Which God for Africa: The Islamic-Christian Missionary Debate in Late-Victorian England.” Victorian Studies 33 (Autumn 1989): 51–73.
- Isaac Taylor, "The Manx Runes," The Manx Note Book, July 1886.
- Etruscan Bologna (extensively covers Isaac Taylor's theories on the Etruscan language)
- Finnish Origin of the Aryans (Isaac Taylor's ideas discussed)
- Author and Bookinfo.com
