= Twinkle, Twinkle, Little Star =

Children's song published in 1806

Nursery rhyme
- Published: 1806
- Lyricist: Jane Taylor

"Twinkle, Twinkle, Little Star" is an English lullaby. The lyrics are from an early-19th-century English poem written by Jane Taylor, "The Star". The poem, which is in couplet form, was first published in 1806 in Rhymes for the Nursery, a collection of poems by Taylor and her sister Ann. It is now sung to the tune of the French melody "Ah! vous dirai-je, maman", which was first published in 1761 and later arranged by several composers, including Mozart with Twelve Variations on "Ah vous dirai-je, Maman". The English lyrics have five stanzas, although only the first is widely known.

Where Jane Taylor was when she wrote the lyric is contested, with the localities of Colchester and Chipping Ongar each asserting a claim. However, Ann Taylor writes (in The Autobiography and Other Memorials of Mrs. Gilbert) that the first time Jane ever saw the village of Ongar was in 1810, and the poem had been published in 1806. "In the summer of 1810, Jane, when visiting London, had enjoyed a pic-nic excursion in Epping Forest, and observed on a sign post at one of the turnings, 'To Ongar.' It was the first time she had seen the name."

== Lyrics ==
The English lyrics were written as a poem by Jane Taylor (1783–1824) and published with the title "The Star" in Rhymes for the Nursery by Jane and her sister Ann Taylor (1782–1866) in London in 1806:

Twinkle, twinkle, little star,
How I wonder what you are!
Up above the world so high,
Like a diamond in the sky.

When the blazing sun is gone,
When he nothing shines upon,
Then you show your little light,
Twinkle, twinkle, all the night.

Then the trav'ller in the dark,
Thanks you for your tiny spark,
He could not see which way to go,
If you did not twinkle so.

In the dark blue sky you keep,
And often thro' my curtains peep,
For you never shut your eye,
Till the sun is in the sky.

'Tis your bright and tiny spark,
Lights the trav'ller in the dark:
Tho' I know not what you are,
Twinkle, twinkle, little star.

The lyrics were first published with the tune "Ah! vous dirai-je, maman" in The Singing Master: First Class Tune Book in 1838. When sung, the first two lines of the entire poem are repeated as a refrain after each stanza.

== Melody ==
"Twinkle, Twinkle, Little Star" is sung to the French melody "Ah! vous dirai-je, maman". The melody is used in other nursery rhymes, including the ABC Song and "Baa, Baa, Black Sheep".

== Other versions ==
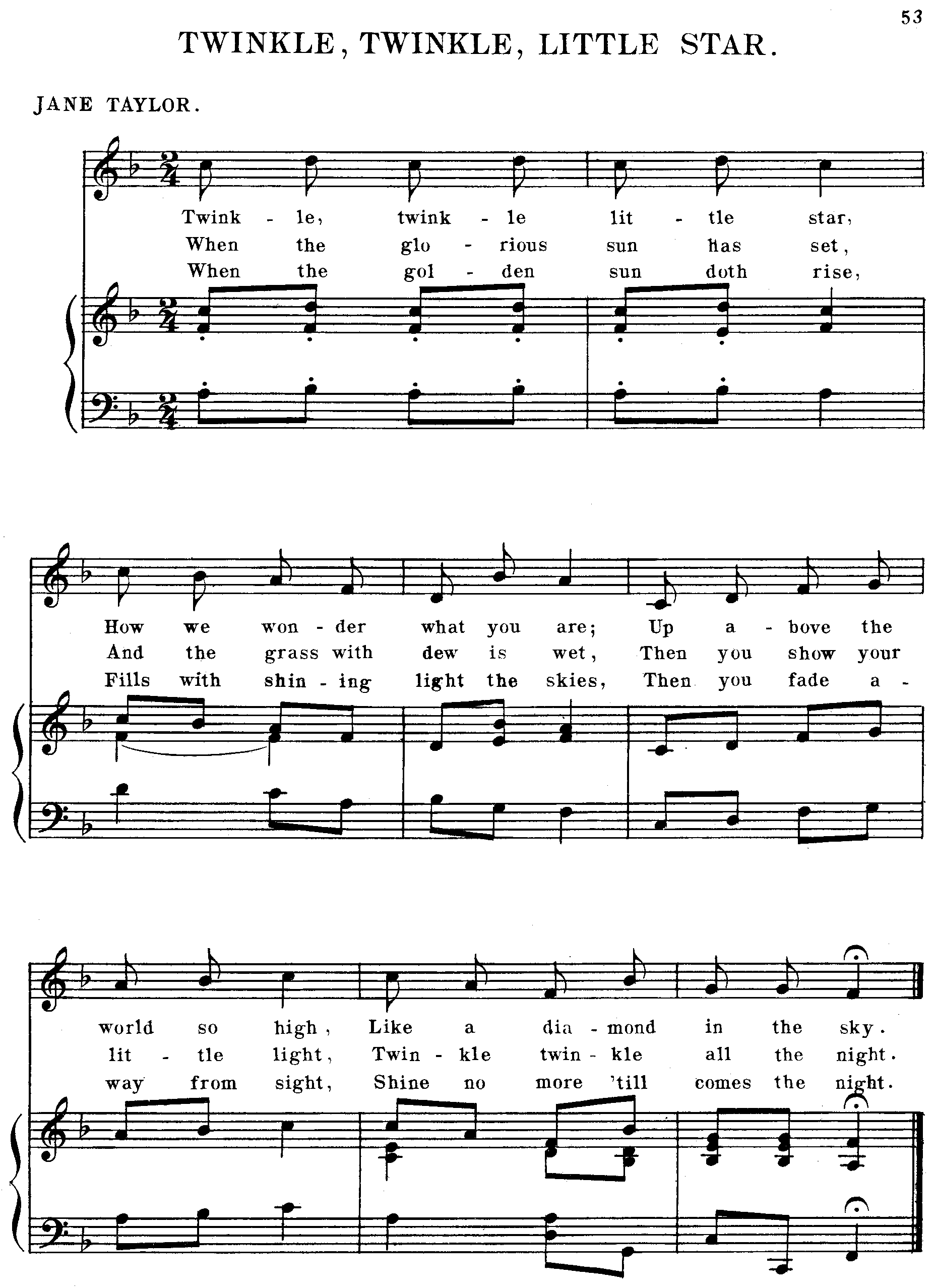
Sheet music from Song Stories for the Kindergarten, setting the words to a different tune

Tune used for the song in Song Stories for the Kindergarten

Additional variations of Twinkle, Twinkle, Little Star include:

From the 1840 novel Poor Jack (chapter 4), by Frederick Marryat:

Pretty little twinkling star,
How I wonder what you are;
All above the earth so high,
Like a diamond in the sky.

From 1896 in Song Stories for the Kindergarten by Mildred J. Hill:

Twinkle, twinkle, little star,
How we wonder what you are.
Up above the world so high,
Like a diamond in the sky.

When the glorious sun has set,
And the grass with dew is wet,
Then you show your little light,
Twinkle, twinkle, all the night.

When the golden sun doth rise,
Fills with shining light the skies,
Then you fade away from sight,
Shine no more 'till comes the night.

A parody of "Twinkle, Twinkle, Little Star" titled "Twinkle, Twinkle, Little Bat" is recited by the Mad Hatter in chapter seven of Lewis Carroll's Alice's Adventures in Wonderland.

Woman performs "Twinkle, Twinkle, Little Star" singing game.

There is also a version using synonyms from Roget's Thesaurus.

The opening lyrics are also used to begin the traditional murder ballad "Duncan and Brady."

The song can also be played as a singing game.

== See also ==
- List of nursery rhymes
- Frère Jacques
- Little Star
- Twinkling
