= Isaac Taylor (engraver) =

English engraver (1730–1807)

Isaac Taylor (1730–1807) was an English engraver.

== Life ==
The son of William Taylor (b. 1693), a versatile artisan, and the writer Ann Taylor (née Cooke), he was born on 13 December 1730 in the parish of St. Michael in Bedwardine, in the city of Worcester. In the early part of his career he worked successively as a brassfounder, a silversmith, and a surveyor. About 1752 he made his way to London, and found employment first at a silversmith’s, and then with Thomas Jefferys the cartographer, at the corner of St Martin's Lane. Under his guidance he executed a number of plates for the Gentleman's Magazine.

Taylor moved on to book illustration, working on William Owen Pughe's Dictionary and Andrew Tooke's Pantheon. Soon after its incorporation, in January 1765, Taylor was admitted a fellow of the Society of Artists, and in 1774 he was appointed secretary as successor to John Hamilton, being the third to hold that post. At the time he joined the society Taylor was living at Holles Street, Clare Market.

Taylor seems to have moved to the Bible and Crown, Holborn, about 1770, to Chancery Lane in 1773, and back to Holborn by 1776. When Thomas Bewick visited London in that year he received kind treatment from Taylor; when, however, after a short experience, Bewick decided that he would ‘rather herd sheep at five shillings a week than be tied to live in London . . . my kind friend left me in a pet and I never saw him more’ (Memoir, 1887, p. 105). Among Taylor's other personal friends were David Garrick, Oliver Goldsmith, Francesco Bartolozzi, Richard Smirke, and Henry Fuseli.

Soon after 1780 Taylor retired to Edmonton, and painted a few subjects in oil. He died at Edmonton on 17 October 1807, aged 77, and was buried in Edmonton churchyard, where there was a monument to him.

== Works ==
Taylor engraved for John Boydell A Flemish Collation, after Van Harp, which was shown at the first exhibition at Spring Gardens, and prefixed a vignette to John Langhorne's Poetical Works (1766), vignettes being then regarded as a virtual monopoly of the "library engravers" of France. Taylor designed and engraved the vignette to Oliver Goldsmith's The Deserted Village in 1770. He also designed and engraved plates for The Fool of Quality, a frontispiece to William Robertson's Charles V (1772), cuts for Sparrman’s ‘ Cape of Good Hope, Clavigero's Mexico, Chambers’s Cyclopædia, and numerous other publications. Among his best-regarded engravings were those for his friend Samuel Richardson's novel Sir Charles Grandison, the plates for which he exhibited with the Society of Artists in 1778. "Not many plates", said Bewick, "have been superior to these", though "as designer", he adds, "he has in these attended too much to fashion and the change of mode".

Portraits by Taylor include a pencil drawing of Cornelius Cayley (1773), Mrs. Abingdon as Lady Betty Modish (drawn and engraved), David Garrick in the character of a drunken sailor speaking the prologue to Britannia (1778), Garrick as Tancred (1776).

== Family ==
Taylor married at Shenfield, Essex, on 9 May 1754, Sarah Hackshaw Jefferys (1733–1809), daughter of Josiah and niece of Thomas Jefferys, and had issue Charles Taylor (1756–1823); Isaac Taylor (1759–1829); Josiah (1761–1834), a publisher in Hatton Garden; Sarah (1763–1845), who married Daniel Hooper; and Ann (1765–1832), who married James Hinton, a clergyman, and was mother of John Howard Hinton. He brought up his two eldest sons as engravers.

James Taylor (1745–1797), younger brother of Isaac, practised for many years as a china painter in the porcelain works at Worcester, but about 1771 came to London to work under his brother. He exhibited at the Incorporated Society between 1771 and 1775, and worked upon illustrations for magazines. Among his pupils was Anker Smith. James Taylor died in London on 21 December 1797. A son of James, who was for some time a singer at Vauxhall Gardens, was also an engraver.
