= Isaac Taylor (1759–1829) =

British engraver (1759–1829)

Isaac Taylor (1759–1829) of Ongar was an English engraver and writer of books for the young.

== Early life ==
The son of Isaac Taylor (1730–1807) by his wife Sarah, daughter of Josiah Jefferys of Shenfield, Essex, he was born in London on 30 January 1759. With his elder brother Charles Taylor, after some education at Brentford grammar school, he was brought up as an engraver in the studio of his father, and worked both in landscape and portraiture.

During his apprenticeship the plates for Abraham Rees's edition of Chambers's Cyclopaedia were executed under his superintendence at his father's establishment, and he met Rees. In 1781 he commissioned Richard Smirke to paint four small circular subjects representing morning, noon, evening, and night, which he engraved and published; and two years later he painted and engraved a set of views on the Thames near London. In 1783 he moved from Islington to Red Lion Street, Holborn, and in June 1786 he left London for Lavenham in Suffolk, where he rented a house and a large garden.

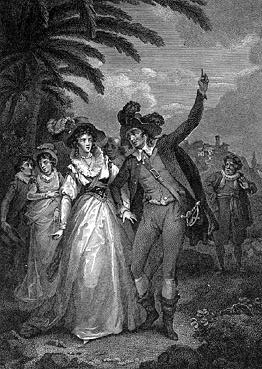
Engraving for Act V of The Taming of the Shrew, Boydell's edition.

He continued his work as an engraver. He was commissioned to engrave a number of plates for John Boydell's Bible and Shakespeare. In 1791 he engraved the assassination of Rizzio after John Opie (for which the Society of Arts awarded him their gold palette and twenty-five guineas), and in 1796 he completed a book of forty plates illustrating the architectural details of the fifteenth-century church at Lavenham, entitled Specimens of Gothic Ornaments selected from the parish church of Lavenham in Suffolk. He also sketched in watercolours and engraved a series of Suffolk mansions.

== Pastor ==
From beginning of the Napoleonic Wars the export of English engravings, which had increased rapidly since 1775, as rapidly diminished. Taylor, who had acquired some fame locally as a preacher, moved to Colchester in 1796 on receiving a call to act as pastor to the independent congregation in Bucklersbury Lane. While there he continued working on plates for Boydell's Shakespeare which he had commenced at Lavenham. That of Henry VIII's first sight of Anne Boleyn, after Charles Alfred Stothard, was completed in 1802 and brought him £500. In 1812 he engraved a set of designs for James Thomson's The Seasons.

In December 1810 Taylor was called as nonconformist pastor to Ongar in Essex, and there he lived during the remaining eighteen years of his life. Taylor died on Saturday, 12 December 1829, and was buried on 19 December at Ongar. A portrait engraved by Blood from a drawing by himself was published in the Evangelical Magazine for 1818.

== Works ==
The long series of books from Ongar by members of the family had them talked of as "Taylors of Ongar", to distinguish them from the contemporary literary family, the "Taylors of Norwich". The literary productiveness of the extended family of Isaac Taylor of Ongar, led Francis Galton Hereditary Genius (1869), to illustrate from the history of the family his theory of the distribution through heredity of intellectual capacity. Of a family of eleven, six survived childhood, and from the time of his residence at Lavenham Taylor dedicated his spare time to the education of his children; he himself was self-taught. Years of teaching led him to evolve a series of educational manuals. His own books were:

- The Biography of a Brown Loaf (London, n.d.);
- Self-cultivation recommended, or hints to a youth on leaving school (1817; 4th ed. 1820);
- Advice to the Teens (1818, two editions);
- Character essential to Success in Life (London, 1820);
- Picturesque Piety, or Scripture Truths illustrated by forty-eight engravings, designed and engraved by the author (London, 1821);
- Beginnings of British Biography: Lives of one hundred persons eminent in British Story (London, 2 vols., 1824, two editions);
- Beginnings of European Biography (London, 2 vols. 1824–5; 3 vols. 1828–9);
- Bunyan explained to a Child (London, 1824, 2 vols., and 1825);
- The Balance of Criminality, or Mental Error, compared with Immoral Conduct (London, 1828).

Taylor also issued, with engravings from designs mostly by himself (a few were by his son Isaac), a series of topographies: Scenes in Europe and Scenes in England (1819), extended to Scenes in Asia, Scenes in Africa, Scenes in America, Scenes in Foreign Lands, Scenes of British Wealth, and (posthumously in 1830) Scenes of Commerce by Land and Sea.

== Family ==
On 18 April 1781 Taylor married at Islington Ann Martin, and had issue:

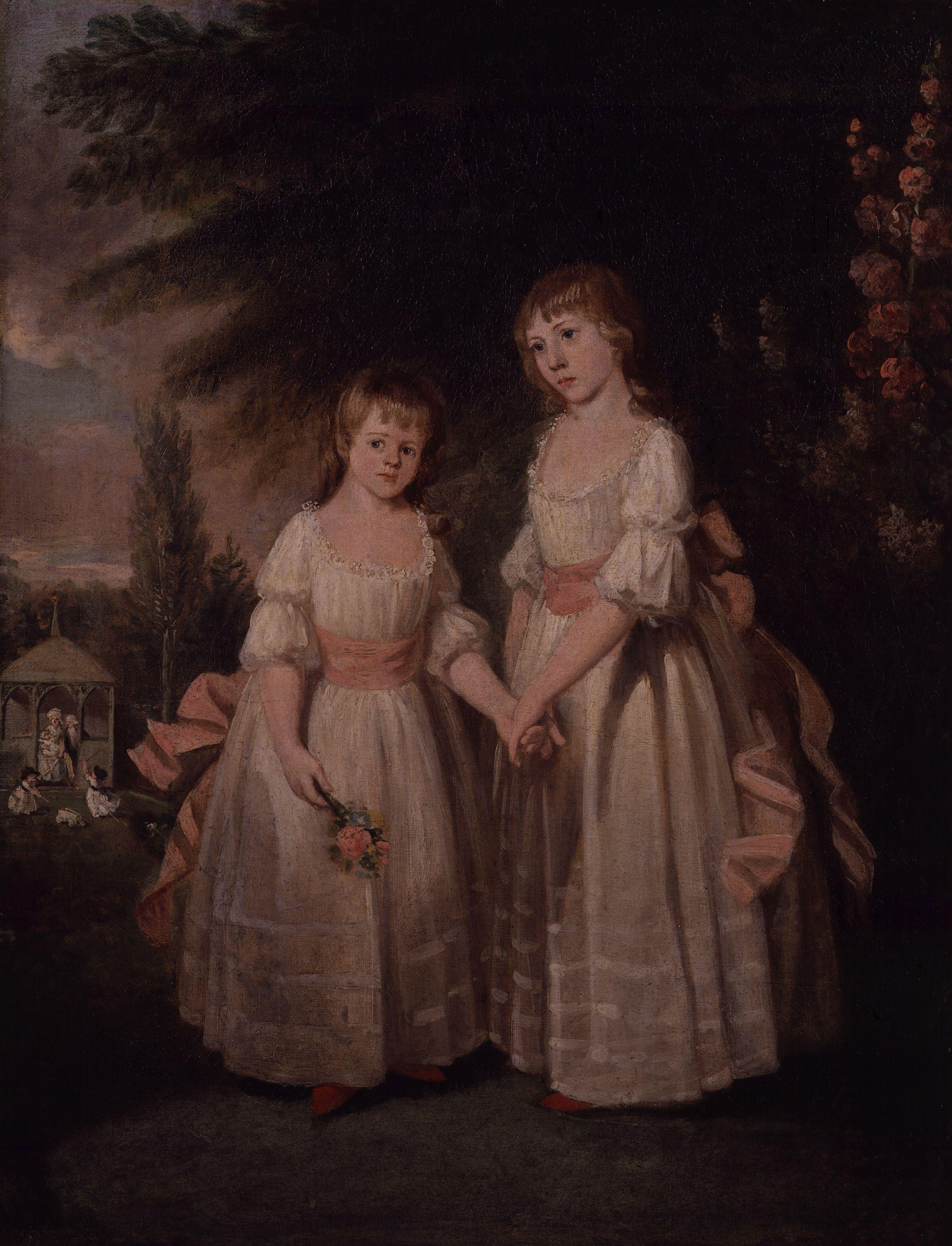
The Taylor family, painted by their father.

- Ann born at Islington on 30 January 1782, who married Joseph Gilbert;
- Jane Taylor;
- two Isaacs who died in infancy;
- Isaac (1787–1865);
- Martin Taylor (1788–1867), the father of Helen Taylor (see below);
- Harriet, Eliza, and Decimus, who died in infancy;
- Jefferys (1792-1853);
- and Jemima (1798–1886), who married Thomas Herbert on 14 August, 1832.

Born on 20 June 1757, from the time of the move to Lavenham in 1786, Mrs. Ann Taylor (1757–1830) shared the educational ideals of her husband. She corresponded with her children during their absences from home, and this correspondence was the nucleus of a series of short manuals of conduct:

- 'Advice to Mothers' (London, n.d.);
- 'Maternal Solicitude for a Daughter's best Interests' (London, 1813; 12th ed. 1830);
- 'Practical Hints to Young Females, or the duties of a wife, a mother, and a mistress of a family' (London, 1815; 11th ed. 1822);
- 'The Present of a Mistress to a Young Servant' (London, 1816; several editions);
- 'Reciprocal Duties of Parents and Children' (London, 1818; 3rd ed. 1819);
- 'The Family Mansion' (London, 1819; a French version appeared in the same year; 2nd ed. 1820);
- 'Retrospection, a Tale' (London, 1821);
- 'The Itinerary of a Traveller in the Wilderness' (London, 1825,); and also
- 'Correspondence between a Mother and her Daughter [Jane] at School' (London, 1817; 6th ed. 1821). Ann Taylor died at Ongar on 4 June 1830; she was buried beside her husband under the vestry floor of Ongar chapel.

Helen Taylor, the daughter of Martin Taylor of Ongar (1788–1867), by his first wife, Elizabeth Venn, made contributions to 'Missionary Hymns' and the 'Teacher's Treasury,' and, besides a short devotional work, 'Sabbath Bells' was author of 'The Child's Books of Homilies' (London, 1850). She died in 1885, and was buried at Parkstone, Dorset.
