= Jane Taylor (poet) =

English poet and novelist (1783–1824)

- Born: 23 September 1783; London, England
- Died: 13 April 1824 (aged 40); Ongar, Essex, England
- Resting place: Essex, England
- Occupations: Poet, novelist
- Relatives: Ann Taylor (sister); Isaac Taylor (brother); Canon Isaac Taylor (nephew)
- Writing career
- Language: English
- Period: 1804–1820s
- Notable work: “Twinkle, Twinkle, Little Star”
- Movement: Romanticism

Jane Taylor (23 September 1783 – 13 April 1824) was an English poet and novelist best known for the lyrics of the widely known "Twinkle, Twinkle, Little Star". The sisters Jane and Ann Taylor and their authorship of various works have often been confused, partly because their early ones were published together. Ann Taylor's son, Josiah Gilbert, wrote in her biography, "Two little poems – 'My Mother', and 'Twinkle, twinkle, little Star' – are perhaps more frequently quoted than any; the first, a lyric of life, was by Ann, the second, of nature, by Jane; and they illustrate this difference between the sisters."

== Biography ==
=== Early life ===
Born in London, Jane Taylor lived with her family at Shilling Grange in Shilling Street, Lavenham, Suffolk, where her house can still be seen. Her mother was the writer Ann Taylor. In 1796–1810, she lived in Colchester, where she is believed to have written "Twinkle, Twinkle, Little Star", which was first published in 1806. A less convincing claim is that it was written in New House, Ongar, as suggested by some descendants of the Taylor family. The Taylor sisters belonged to an extensive literary family. Their father, Isaac Taylor of Ongar, was an engraver and later a dissenting minister. Their mother, Ann Taylor (née Martin) (1757–1830), wrote seven works of moral and religious advice, two of which were fictionalized.

=== Literary career ===
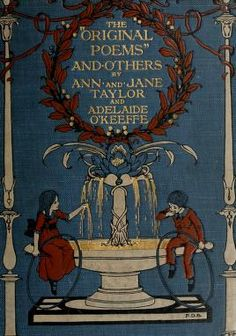
The 'Original Poems' and Others, by Ann and Jane Taylor and Adelaide O'Keeffe – 1905 edition

The collection Original Poems for Infant Minds by several young persons was solicited by the publisher Darton and Harvey and published anonymously. The main contributors were Ann Taylor, Jane Taylor, and Adelaide O'Keeffe, but Bernard Barton and various other members of the Taylor family contributed to it as well. As Donelle Ruwe writes in her study of its genesis and reception history, it was issued as a single-volume work in 1804. When it proved successful, further poems were solicited for an additional volume, which was published in 1805. Over time, the collection became associated with the Taylor family. Although O'Keeffe wrote to the publisher requesting a greater percentage of the collection's proceeds, Darton and Harvey deferred to the Taylor family regarding all editorial decisions. For their part, the Taylor family was openly hostile to O'Keeffe and dismissive of her background in writing for the stage. (O'Keeffe's father was the popular Irish playwright John O'Keeffe.)

After the success of Original Poems for Infant Minds, Ann and Jane Taylor published the poetry collections Rhymes for the Nursery in 1806 and Hymns for Infant Minds in 1810. In the two volumes of Original Poems for Infant Minds, the Taylor sisters, O'Keeffe, and the other contributors were identified as authors for each poem by initial or other identifying markers. In Rhymes for the Nursery (1806), Ann and Jane Taylor were not identified as the collection's authors or individual poems. The most famous piece in the 1806 collection is "The Star", commonly known today as "Twinkle, Twinkle, Little Star", which was set to a French tune which was also set to variations by Mozart.

Christina Duff Stewart identifies authorship in Rhymes for the Nursery based on a copy belonging to Canon Isaac Taylor, who noted the pieces by Ann and Jane Taylor. Canon Isaac was Taylor's nephew, a son of her brother Isaac Taylor of Stanford Rivers. Stewart also confirms attributions of Original Poems based on the publisher's records.

Jane Taylor also wrote the popular moral verse, The Violet, which begins:

Down in a green and shady bed,
A modest violet grew;
Its stalk was bent, it hung its head
As if to hide from view.
And yet it was a lovely flower,
Its colour bright and fair;
It might have graced a rosy bower,
Instead of hiding there.

Taylor's novel Display (1814), reminiscent of Maria Edgeworth or perhaps even Jane Austen, went through at least 13 editions up to 1832. Her Essays in Rhyme appeared in 1816, and contained some significant poetry. In the fictional Correspondence between a Mother and Her Daughter at School (1817), Taylor collaborated with her mother. The Family Mansion. A Tale appeared in 1819, and Practical Hints to Young Females some time before 1822.

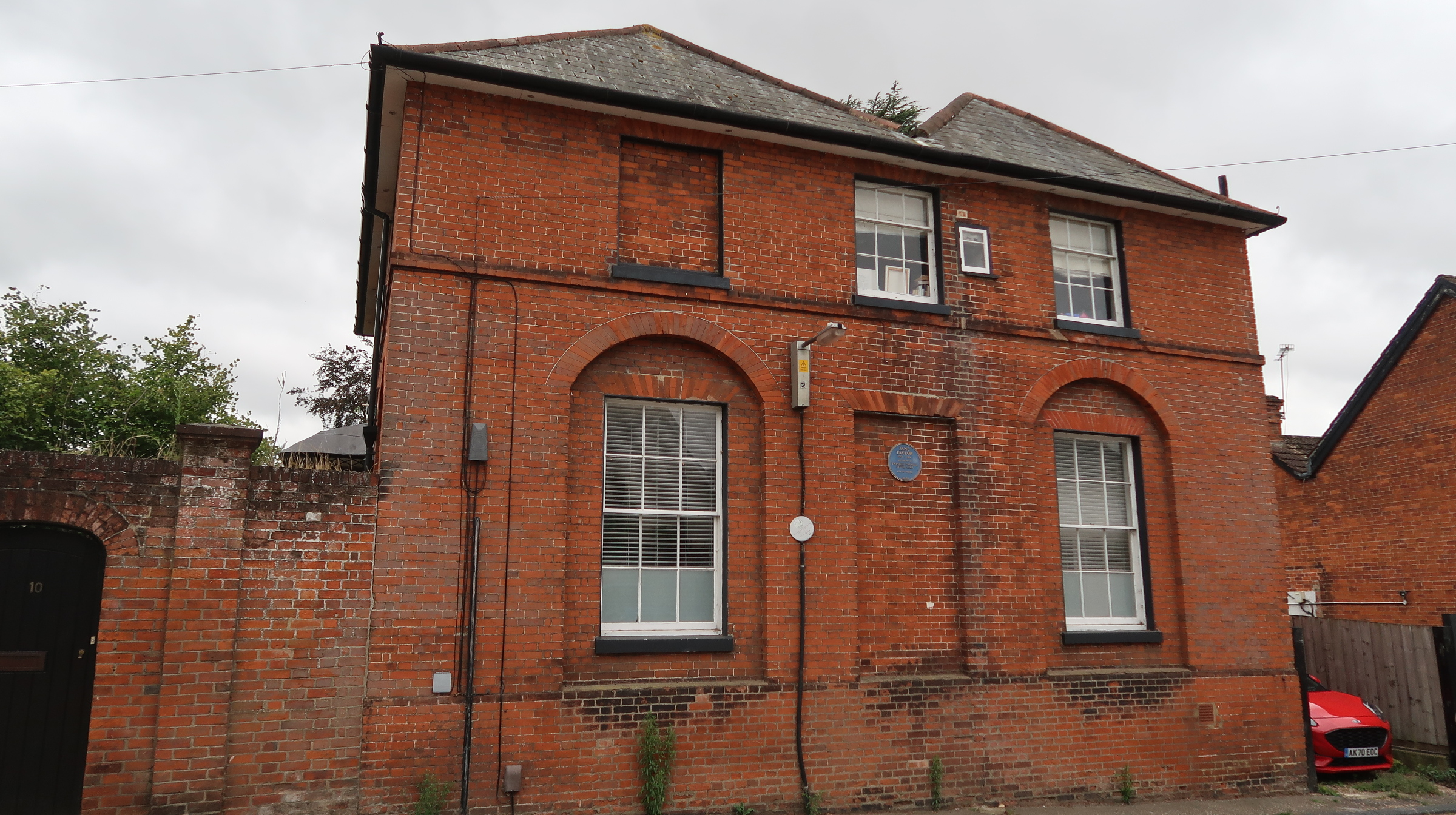
10 Castle Street, Chipping Ongar, Essex in 2023 displaying a plaque: Jane Taylor 1783–1824 Author of Twinkle Twinkle Little Star lived here omhs (Ongar Millennium History Society)

Jane Taylor accepted the editorship of the religious Youth's Magazine. She wrote numerous shorter pieces for the magazine, including moral tales and personal essays, and these were collected in The Contributions of Q. Q. Throughout her life, Taylor wrote many essays, plays, stories, poems, and letters which were never published. She was also erroneously named as author of works such as The Authoress (1819), Prudence and Principle (1818), and Rachel: A Tale (1817).

=== Death ===
Jane Taylor died on 13 April 1824 of breast cancer at the age of 40, her mind still "teeming with unfulfilled projects". She was buried at Ongar churchyard in Essex. After her death, her brother Isaac collected many of her works and included a biography of her in The Writings of Jane Taylor, In Five Volumes (1832).

== Popular influence ==
- Taylor's most famous verse, "Twinkle, Twinkle, Little Star", is almost always uncredited. "Its opening stanza persists as if it were folklore, the name of its creator almost entirely forgotten." Alternative versions, pastiches and parodies abounded. See Twinkle twinkle little star § Other versions.
- The best-known parody of "Twinkle, Twinkle, Little Star" is a poem recited by the Mad Hatter in Lewis Carroll's Alice's Adventures in Wonderland (1865).
- Jane Taylor is credited by Robert Browning in an introductory note to a late poem, "Rephan", which he states was "suggested by a very early recollection of a prose story" by her.
