= Isaac Taylor =

English philosopher, historian, and inventor (1787–1865)

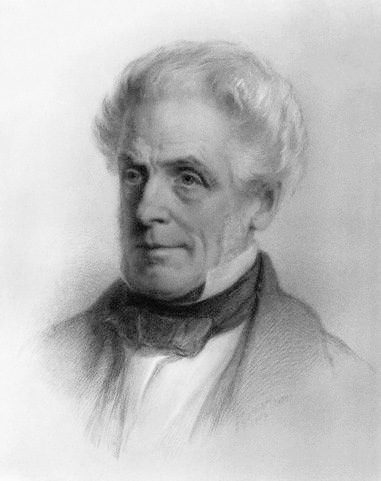
- Isaac Taylor, chalk drawing by Josiah Gilbert.
- Born: 17 August 1787; Lavenham
- Died: 28 June 1865 (aged 77)

Isaac Taylor (17 August 1787 – 28 June 1865) was an English philosophical and historical writer, artist, and inventor.

== Life ==
He was the eldest surviving son of Isaac Taylor of Ongar. He was born at Lavenham, Suffolk, on 17 August 1787, and moved with his family to Colchester and, at the end of 1810, to Ongar. In the family tradition, he was trained as draughtsman and engraver. After a few years' occupation as a designer of book illustrations, he turned to literature as vocation.

From 1812 to 1816 he wintered in the west of England, and he spent most of this time at Ilfracombe and Marazion in the company of his sister, Jane. About 1815 through the works of Sulpicius Severus he started to collect patristic literature. Shortly afterwards Francis Bacon's De Augmentis excited his interest in inductive philosophy. In 1818 a friend of the family, Josiah Conder, then editor of the Eclectic Review, persuaded Taylor to join its regular staff, which already included Robert Hall, John Foster, and Olinthus Gilbert Gregory.

In 1825 he settled at Stanford Rivers, about two miles from Ongar, in a rambling old-fashioned farmhouse. There he married, on 17 August 1825, Elizabeth, second daughter of James Medland of Newington, the friend and correspondent of his sister Jane. In 1836 Taylor contested the chair of logic at Edinburgh University with Sir William Hamilton, and was narrowly beaten. In March 1841, in Hanover Square, he delivered four lectures on 'Spiritual Christianity'. Though he joined the Anglican communion at an early stage in his career, Taylor remained on good terms with friends among the dissenters.

Taylor was granted a civil list pension of £200 in 1862 as acknowledgment of his services to literature, and he died at Stanford Rivers three years later, on 28 June 1865.

Taylor was elected an International Member of the American Philosophical Society in 1895.

== Works ==
As a young man he executed designs for his father and for the books issued by his sister Jane Taylor. He executed anatomical drawings for a surgeon, and painted miniatures, one a portrait of his sister, another of himself in 1817. Some of his designs for John Boydell's 'Illustrations of Holy Writ' (1820), were admired by Dante Gabriel Rossetti, and compared by Alexander Gilchrist with some of the plates of William Blake (Life of Blake, 1863).

In 1822 appeared Taylor's first book, The Elements of Thought (London, 1823; 11th edit. 1867), later recast as The World of Mind (London, 1857). This was followed in 1824 by a new translation of the Characters of Theophrastus (by 'Francis Howell,' London). The translator added pictorial renderings of the characters drawn on wood by himself. In 1825 there followed the Memoirs, Correspondence, and Literary Remains of Jane Taylor (London, 1825, 2 vols.; 2nd edit. 1826; incorporated in The Taylors of Ongar, 1867).

History of the Transmission of Ancient Books to Modern Times (London, 1827) and The Process of Historical Proof (London, 1828) were later remodelled as a single work (1859), in which he attempted to show grounds for accepting literary documents like the Bible as a basis for history. Next appeared an expurgated translation of Herodotus (London, 1829), work which seems to have suggested an anonymous romance, The Temple of Melekartha (London, 1831), dealing with the prehistoric migration of the Tyrians from the Persian Gulf to the Levant. Taylor is said to have depicted his wife in the heroine. His next and best-known work, The Natural History of Enthusiasm (London; Boston, 1830; 10th edit. London, 1845), appeared anonymously in May 1829. It was a sort of historico-philosophical disquisition on religious imagination, and had an instant vogue. Taylor developed the subject in his Fanaticism (London, 1833; 7th edit. 1866) and Spiritual Despotism (London, 1835, three editions). Three further volumes on scepticism, credulity, and the corruption of morals were included in the author's plan of a 'morbid anatomy of spurious religion,' but these complementary volumes were never completed. Those that appeared were praised by John Wilson in Blackwood's Magazine and the last of the three particularly by Sir James Stephen in the Edinburgh Review (April 1840).

In the meantime Taylor had published a devotional volume, Saturday Evening (London, 1832; many editions in England and America). Subsequently, he developed a part of that book into The Physical Theory of Another Life (London, 1836; 6th edit. 1866), a work of speculation, anticipating a scheme of duties in a future world, adapted to an assumed expansion of human powers after death.

His next book was Home Education (London, 1838; 7th edit. 1867), in which he insisted on the beneficial influence of a country life, the educational value of children's pleasures, and the natural rather than the stimulated growth of a child's mental powers. He then completed and edited a translation of the Jewish Wars of Josephus by Robert Traill (1793–1847); it appeared in two sumptuous illustrated volumes (1847 and 1851), but lost money.

In his publication during 1839–40 of Ancient Christianity and the Doctrines of the Oxford Tracts (in 8 parts, London; 4th edit. 1844, 2 vols.), Taylor argued as controversialist against the Tracts for the Times, his contention being that the Christian Church of the fourth century had already matured into superstition and error. This view was contested. Loyola and Jesuitism in its Rudiments (London, 1849; several editions) and Wesley and Methodism (London, 1851; 1863, 1865, and New York, 1852) were followed by a popular work on the Christian argument, The Restoration of Belief (London, 1855; several American editions), an anonymous publication. Logic in Theology and Ultimate Civilisation were volumes of essays reprinted in part from the Eclectic Review during 1859 and 1860, and were followed in turn by The Spirit of Hebrew Poetry (London, 1861; numerous editions), a volume of lectures, originally delivered at Edinburgh. After Considerations on the Pentateuch (London, 1863; two editions), in which he opposed the conclusions of John William Colenso, and a number of short memoirs for the Imperial Dictionary of Biography, his last work was Personal Recollections (London, 1864), a series of papers, in part autobiographical, which had appeared in Good Words.

== Inventor ==
Taylor was interested in mechanical devices and inventions, and he had a workshop that he fitted up at Stanford Rivers. Early in life he invented a beer-tap (patented 20 November 1824) which came into wide use, and he designed a machine for engraving on copper (pat. 12248, 21 August 1848). Though it did not profit him, the idea was eventually applied on a large scale by a syndicate to engraving patterns on copper cylinders for calico printing in Manchester.

== Family ==
Two of his sisters had a reputation as poets. Ann Taylor, later Mrs. Gilbert (1782–1866), and Jane (1783–1824), responsible for the well-known rhyme Twinkle Twinkle Little Star. Josiah Gilbert, son of Ann Taylor, was an artist and author.

Taylor's children were:

- Jane, who married, first, Dr. Harrison, and secondly, the Rev. S. D. Stubbs;
- Isaac Taylor (1829–1901), churchman and author;
- Phœbe;
- James Medland Taylor, architect, born 1834;
- Rosa;
- Henry Taylor, architect and author, born in 1837;
- Catherine;
- Jessie, who married Thomas Wilson; and
- Euphemia.
