= Ann Taylor (poet) =

English poet and literary critic (1782–1866)

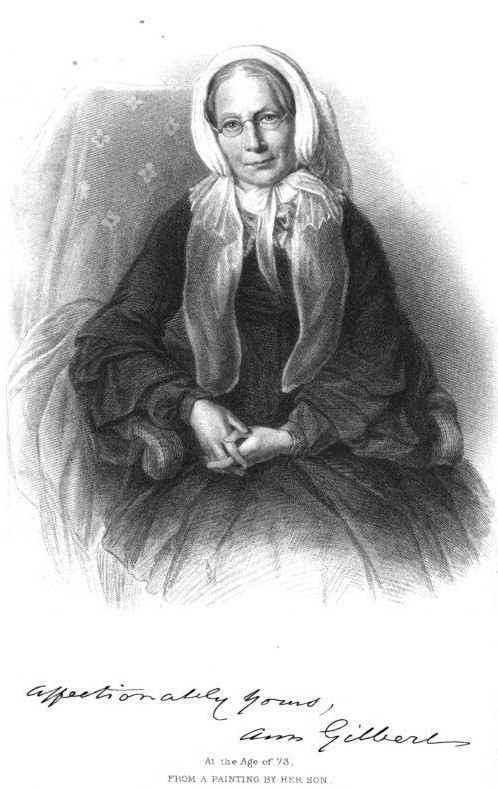
Ann Taylor

Ann Taylor (30 January 1782 – 20 December 1866) was an English poet and literary critic. She gained lasting popularity in her youth as a writer of verse for children. In the years up to her marriage, she became an astringent literary critic. However, she is best remembered as the elder sister and collaborator of Jane Taylor.

== Family ==
The Taylor sisters were part of an extensive literary family, daughters of the engraver Isaac Taylor of Ongar and the writer Ann Taylor. Ann was born in Islington and lived with her family at first in London and later in Lavenham, Suffolk, in Colchester, and briefly in Ongar. The sisters' father, Isaac Taylor, and her grandfather were both engravers. Her father later became an educational pioneer and Independent minister, writing a number of instructional books for the young. Their mother, Mrs (Ann Martin) Taylor (1757–1830) wrote seven works of moral and religious advice in many respects liberal for their time, two of them fictionalized.

Isaac, brother of Ann and Jane, wrote as a theologian, but also as the inventor of a patent beer tap. Their uncle Charles Taylor edited The Literary Panorama, for which he wrote on topics from art to politics, and produced anonymously a massive annotated translation of Augustin Calmet's Dictionary of the Bible. Their youngest brother Josiah was a publisher, chiefly of works on architecture and design.

== Authorship ==
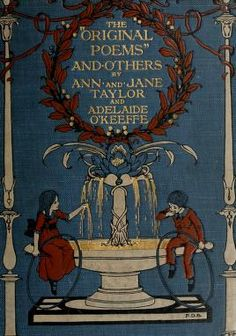
The 'Original Poems' and Others, by Ann and Jane Taylor and Adelaide O'Keeffe - 1905 edition.

The sisters and their authorship of various works have often been confused, usually to Jane's advantage. This is in part because their early works for children were published together and without attribution, but also because Jane, by dying young at the height of her powers, unwittingly attracted early posthumous eulogies, including what is almost a hagiography by her brother Isaac, and much of Ann's work came to be ascribed to Jane, a borrowing which, Ann ruefully remarked, she could ill afford and which Jane certainly did not require. It is true that Jane achieved much more than Ann as a writer of poetry for an adult readership – though Ann's poem "The Maniac's Song", published in the Associate Minstrels (1810), was probably the finest short poem by either sister, and it has been postulated as an inspiration for Keats's La Belle Dame sans Merci (Lynette Felber: Ann Taylor's "The Maniac's Song": an unacknowledged source for Keats's "La Belle Dame sans Merci".

However, Ann Taylor also deserves remembering as a writer of prose, particularly for her autobiography and the many letters of hers that survive. Her style is strong and vivid, and when she was not too preoccupied with moral and religious themes, she tended, like her sister Jane, to pessimism about her own spiritual worth – it is often shot through with a pleasing and sometimes acerbic wit. The autobiography also provides detailed information on the life of what was a moderately prosperous dissenting family in the late 18th and early 19th centuries.

== Appreciations ==
Ann Taylor's son, Josiah Gilbert, wrote:

"Two little poems – 'My Mother', and 'The Star', are perhaps, more frequently quoted than any. The first, a lyric of life, was by Ann, the second, of nature, by Jane; and they illustrate this difference between the sisters."

Both poems attracted the compliment of frequent parody throughout the 19th century. The logician Augustus De Morgan asserted (somewhat extravagantly) that Gilbert's mother wrote "one of the most beautiful lyrics in the English language, or any other language" and not knowing that Ann Gilbert was still alive, called upon Tennyson to supply a less heterodox version of the final stanza, which seemed to de Morgan unworthy of the rest.

Original Poems for Infant Minds by several young persons (by Ann and Jane, Adelaide O'Keeffe, and others) was first issued in 1804, and when it proved successful, a second volume followed in 1805. Adelaide O'Keeffe authored over 30 of the poems in the collection, though she has rarely received full credit for this. Ann Taylor's verse "My Mother" became a sentimental favourite. It was republished throughout the 19th century and was still being memorized as a standard recital work into the mid-20th century. Donelle Ruwe traces the publishing history of "My Mother," beginning in 1807 when the poem was first published as a stand-alone, single-volume work. The 1807 "My Mother" featured illustrations by Peltro Williams Tomkins. While Tomkins was inspired by the attitudes of Lady Emma Hamilton, later illustrators of "My Mother," such as Walter Crane in 1873, reflected changing ideologies of motherhood as well as the artistic style of the Arts and Crafts Movement. Other poems of hers from Original Poems for Infant Minds are also significant. Ruwe identifies Ann's "The Hand-Post" as an interesting example of the clash between Romantic-era Gothic literature for adults and the different expectations of children's texts. As Ruwe notes in an essay, "The Rational Gothic," it manages to tell a Gothic tale – of a boy terrified by a ghostly hand-post – but concludes with a series of moral lessons about the importance of checking for evidence instead of bowing to irrational fears.

Ann and Jane Taylor's Rhymes for the Nursery followed in 1806, and Hymns for Infant Minds in 1808. In Original Poems for Infant Minds the authors were identified for each poem, which in Rhymes for the Nursery (1806) they were not. Attributions for their poems can be found in an exceptional resource: The Taylors of Ongar: An Analytical Bio-Bibliography by Christina Duff Stewart. Stewart cites a copy of Rhymes for the Nursery belonging to a nephew, Canon Isaac Taylor, annotated to show the respective authorship of Ann and Jane. Stewart also confirms attributions in Original Poems based on publisher's records.

== Marriage and widowhood ==
On 24 December 1813, Ann married Joseph Gilbert, an Independent (later Congregational) minister and theologian, and left Ongar for a new home far from her family, at Masborough near Rotherham. A widower of 33, Gilbert had proposed to Ann before he even met her, forming a sound estimate of her character and intelligence from her writings, particularly as a trenchant critic in The Eclectic Review. Gilbert was at the time of their marriage the classics tutor at Rotherham Independent College – the nearest body to a university open to Dissenters at that time – and simultaneously pastor of the Nether Chapel in Sheffield. In 1817, he moved to the pastorate of the Fish Street Chapel in Hull, and then in 1825 to Nottingham, serving in chapels there for the rest of his life.

While busy with the duties of wife and later mother, Ann Gilbert managed to write further poems, hymns, essays and letters. Her interest in public matters such as atheism, prison reform and the anti-slavery movement often spurred her, and the results found a way into print. Oddly for one of independence of mind and strongly held, usually liberal opinions, she was firmly opposed to female suffrage.

After Gilbert died on 12 December 1852, Ann wrote a memoir of him. Nor did she spend the rest of her long life in retirement. While actively supporting the members of her large family through visits and a stream of letters – family was always of central concern to the Taylors – she travelled widely in Britain, taking in her stride as an old lady travelling conditions that might have daunted one much younger. She died on 20 December 1866 and was buried next to her husband in Nottingham General Cemetery, although the inscription recording this on the vast Gothic sarcophagus has disappeared.

== Bibliography ==
- Ann Taylor, The Autobiography and Other Memorials of Mrs Gilbert, Formerly Ann Taylor, ed. Josiah Gilbert. London: Henry S. King & Co., 1874
- Memoirs, Correspondence and Poetical Remains of Jane Taylor Volume I of The Writings of Jane Taylor, In Five Volumes: Boston: Perkins & Marvin, 1832
