= James Higgs-Walker =

English cricketer

Cricket information
- Bowling: Right-arm fast

Career statistics
Competition	First-class
Matches	2
Runs scored	44
Batting average	22.00
100s/50s	0/0
Top score	44
Balls bowled	112
Wickets	1
Bowling average	89.00
5 wickets in innings	0
10 wickets in match	0
Best bowling	1/69
Catches/stumpings	0/–
- Source: Cricinfo, 7 November 2022

James Arthur Higgs-Walker (31 July 1892 – 3 September 1979) was an English first-class cricketer who played in two matches for Worcestershire, one each side of the First World War.

His first match, and only County Championship appearance, came against Gloucestershire at Cheltenham in August 1913, though he had something of a nightmare debut: he made 0 and 0* with the bat, conceded 20 runs from two wicketless overs, and did not hold a catch.

After the war he appeared once more, against Warwickshire in one of the friendly games Worcestershire played in 1919 (the county did not return to Championship cricket until the following season). This time he made a rather better fist of things, scoring 44 in his only innings and taking the only wicket of his career when he bowled Warwickshire's number ten Ernest Suckling.

He taught history at Oundle School after the War, where he later became a housemaster. In 1925 Higgs-Walker was appointed headmaster of Sevenoaks School, a post in which he remained until 1954.

Higgs-Walker was born at Wychbury House, Clent, Worcestershire; he died aged 87 in Midhurst, Sussex.
