= Wang-y-tong =

Chinese merchant

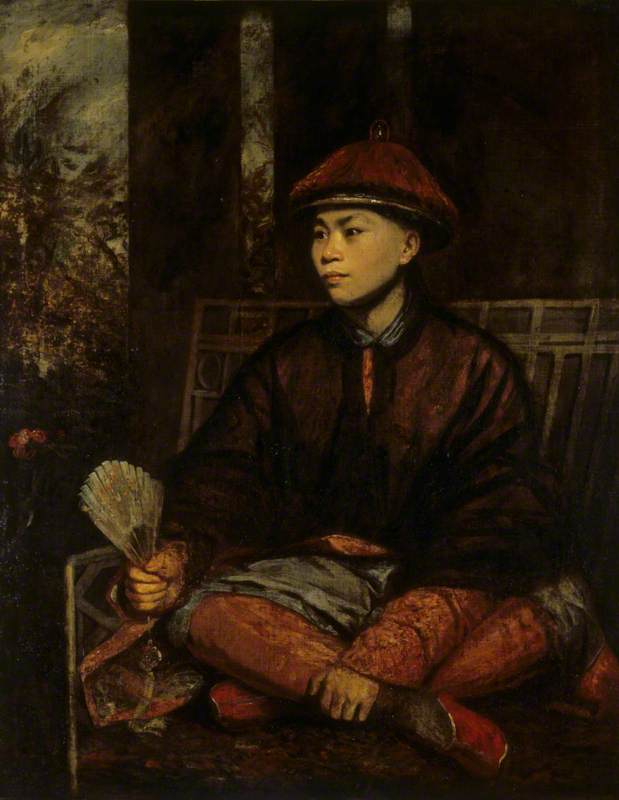
A 1776 Portrait of Wang-y-tong by Sir Joshua Reynolds

Wang-y-tong (Note: also known as Wang-o-Tang, Whang Atong, Whang at Tong, Whang-at-Ting, Quang-at-Tong, Warnoton, Hwang-a-tung, or Huang Ya Dong) (Chinese: 黃亞東; c. 1753, fl. 1770s – c. 1784) was a Chinese youth who visited England in the late 18th century. After the Christian convert Michael Shen Fuzong in 1687, the merchant Loum Kiqua in 1756–1757, and the artist Tan-Che-Qua in 1769 to 1772, Wang is one of the earliest Chinese people known to have visited England.

== Life ==
Little is known of Wang's early life. Having heard about Tan-Che-Qua's journey to and reception in England, Wang also decided to travel to England. He was brought to England from Guangzhou by John Bradby Blake in the early 1770s. Blake was a supercargo for the East India Company, and also a naturalist, who was interested in Wang's knowledge of cultivating Chinese plants, and their culinary and medicinal uses. After Blake's death in 1773, Wang was taken into the care of Blake's father, Captain John Blake.

Wang visited the Royal Society on January 12, 1775. In a letter of 1775, he is said to be about 22 years old. He was visited at Blake's house, where he discussed the manufacture of Chinese ceramics with Josiah Wedgwood, and acupuncture with physician Andrew Duncan.

He became a page to Giovanna Baccelli, a mistress of John Sackville, 3rd Duke of Dorset, and lived at Knole in Kent, attending the nearby Sevenoaks School. The Duke commissioned a portrait of Wang in 1776, paying Joshua Reynolds 70 guineas, framed by Thomas Vialls. The painting is exhibited in the Reynolds Room at Knole, alongside portraits of other 18th century celebrities by Reynolds, including the Duke, Reynolds himself, Samuel Johnson, and David Garrick. In the Reynolds portrait, Wang is depicted sitting cross-legged on a bamboo chair, holding a fan, and wearing crimson and blue oriental robes, red shoes and a conical Asian hat. He has been described as a living example of chinoiserie. A portrait by George Dance the younger in pencil with watercolour is held by the British Museum, with Wang drawn in profile wearing European clothing.

Wang was in the library of the British Museum on 25 November 1773, and while there, he was asked to examine two Japanese books. The books had previously been examined by Tan-Che-Qua. The information Wang gave about the books was written down on their covers for future reference. After this, Wang’s expertise was employed by a library on another occasion. In June 1775, he visited Oxford, where he examined a copy of the Kangxi Dictionary, in the library of St. John’s College. The volumes of the dictionary were in disarray, since no-one had been able to decipher it, but Wang placed them in correct order.

Wang had returned to China before 1785. In December 1784, he was working as a trader in Canton when he replied to a letter from the linguist Sir William Jones asking for help with the translation of the Shijing.

== Name ==
He is mentioned in several 18th-century sources on China, including a satire by Lichtenberg, Von den Kriegs- und Fast-Schulen der Schinesen (published in the Göttinger Taschencalender for 1796). Lichtenberg translated his name as "yellow man from the east". It has been speculated that his family name may have been Huang and his given name Ya Dong – the characters of Huang (黃) and Dong (東) also represent "yellow" and "east" – and his full name may have been Huang Ya Dong (黃亞東). This is supported by a note of his name, supposedly written in his own hand for Mary Delany, and copied into her letter to Mary Port of 11 June 1775.

Wang is occasionally confused with or misidentified as Tan-Che-Qua (or Tan Chitqua), a Chinese artist who arrived in England in 1769, and exhibited his work at the Royal Academy in 1770, but Tan-Che-Qua had returned to China in 1772. Tan-Che-Qua was included in a group portrait of the Royal Academicians by Johann Zoffany. A portrait of Tan-Che-Qua, thought to be by John Hamilton Mortimer, is held by the Hunterian Museum at the Royal College of Surgeons in London.

== See also ==
- Omai, a Polynesian visitor to England also painted by Reynolds in 1773
