= Giovanna Baccelli =

Venetian ballerina (1753–1801)

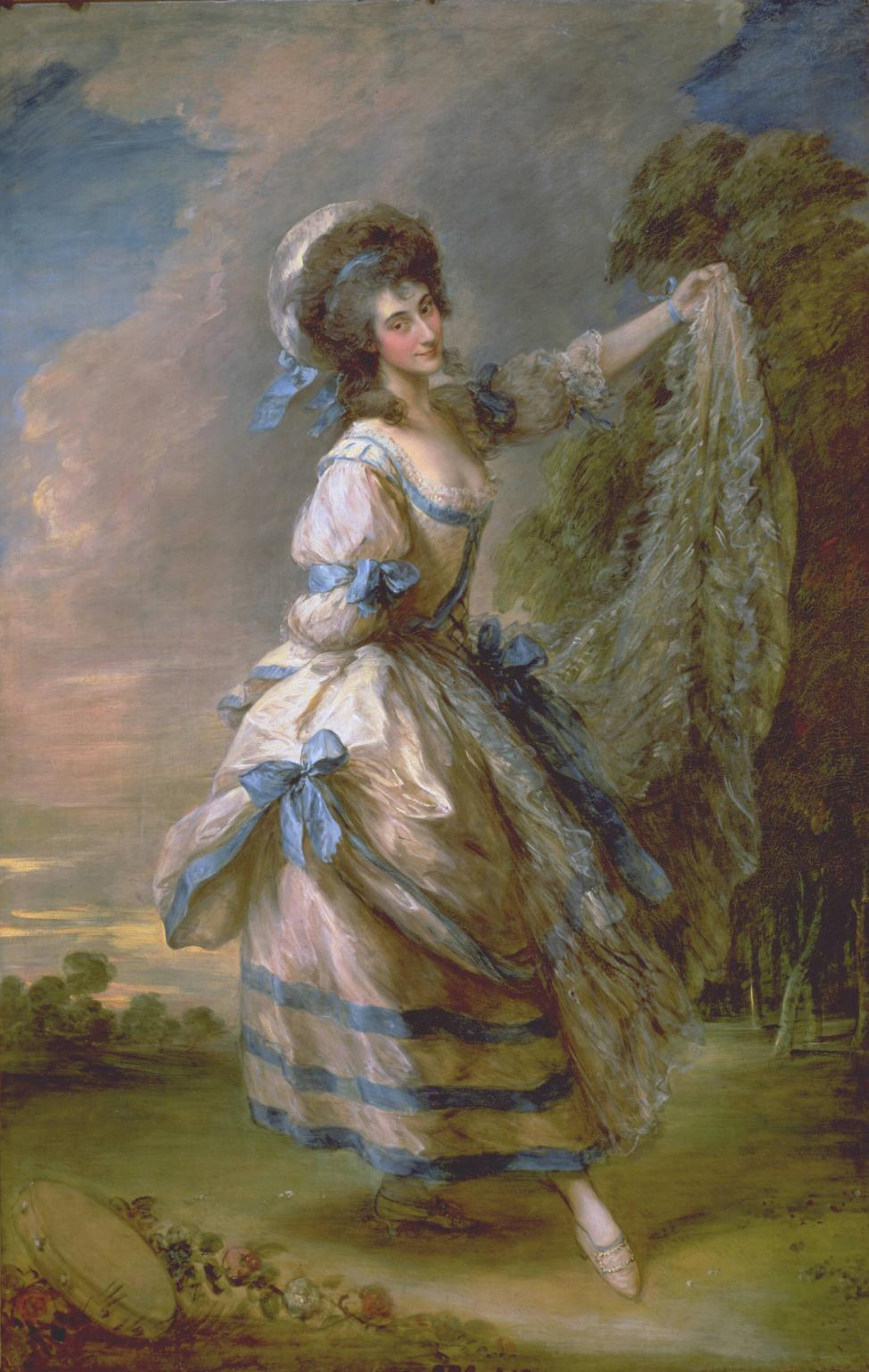
Portrait of Giovanna Baccelli by Thomas Gainsborough. Oil on canvas, c. 1782. Tate Gallery, London.

Giovanna Baccelli, real name Giovanna Francesca Antonia Giuseppa Zanerini, (1753–1801) was a Venetian ballerina. She was the principal ballerina at the King's Theatre, Haymarket in the 1770s.

== Early life ==
Giovanna Baccelli was born Giovanna Francesca Antonia Giuseppa Zanerini in Venice in 1753. She took her mother's name of Baccelli as her stage name.

== Career ==
She was the principal ballerina at the King's Theatre, Haymarket, making her first appearance in 1774. She had an acclaimed career and appeared with Gaetan Vestris and his son Auguste in a number of important ballets devised by Jean-Georges Noverre during the 1780-1 season. Baccelli also performed to acclaim in Venice in 1783-4, and at the Paris Opéra in 1788.

She was the mistress of John Sackville, 3rd Duke of Dorset. Dorset commissioned a painting of her in the costume from the ballet Les Amans Surpris which she performed in 1780–81 from Thomas Gainsborough. It is considered to be one of Gainsborough's later masterpieces. Dorset also commissioned a painting by Joshua Reynolds and a sculpture showing her nude and prone on a divan and cushions; this is still to be found at Knole. Baccelli was also painted by Ozias Humphrey, John Graham and Gainsborough Dupont (c.1795, which is held in the Royal Collection).

Wang-y-tong, one of the earliest Chinese people known to have visited Britain, featured in sketches for her Reynolds portrait and was in 1776 himself painted by Reynolds. He is reputed to have been her page for a short time.

When made Ambassador to France in 1783, Dorset took Baccelli to Paris with him, and she danced at the Opera by invitation. (When he was made Knight of the Garter (KG), she wore the blue ribbon of the Garter while dancing).

== Children ==
Dorset and Giovanna had a son together: John Frederick Sackville (1778–1796), who was raised by his father at Paris and Knole after the couple parted in 1789.

== Death ==
Giovanna Baccelli died in 1801.
