= Tan-Che-Qua =

Chinese artist

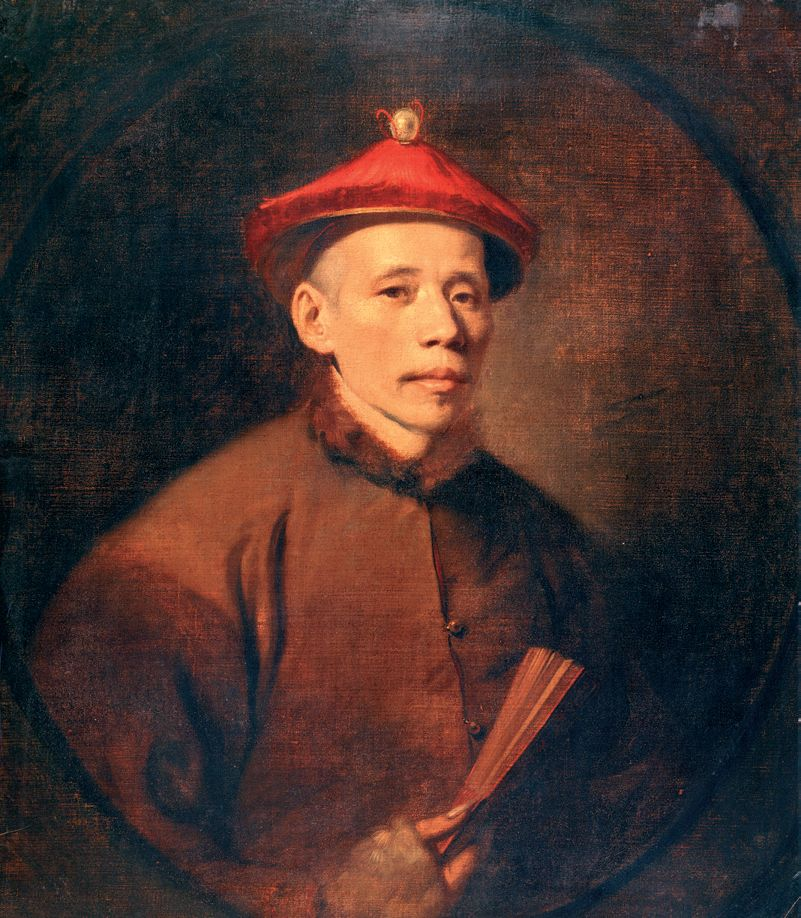
Portrait of Tan Che-qua, by John Hamilton Mortimer, 1770 or 1771, Royal College of Surgeons of England

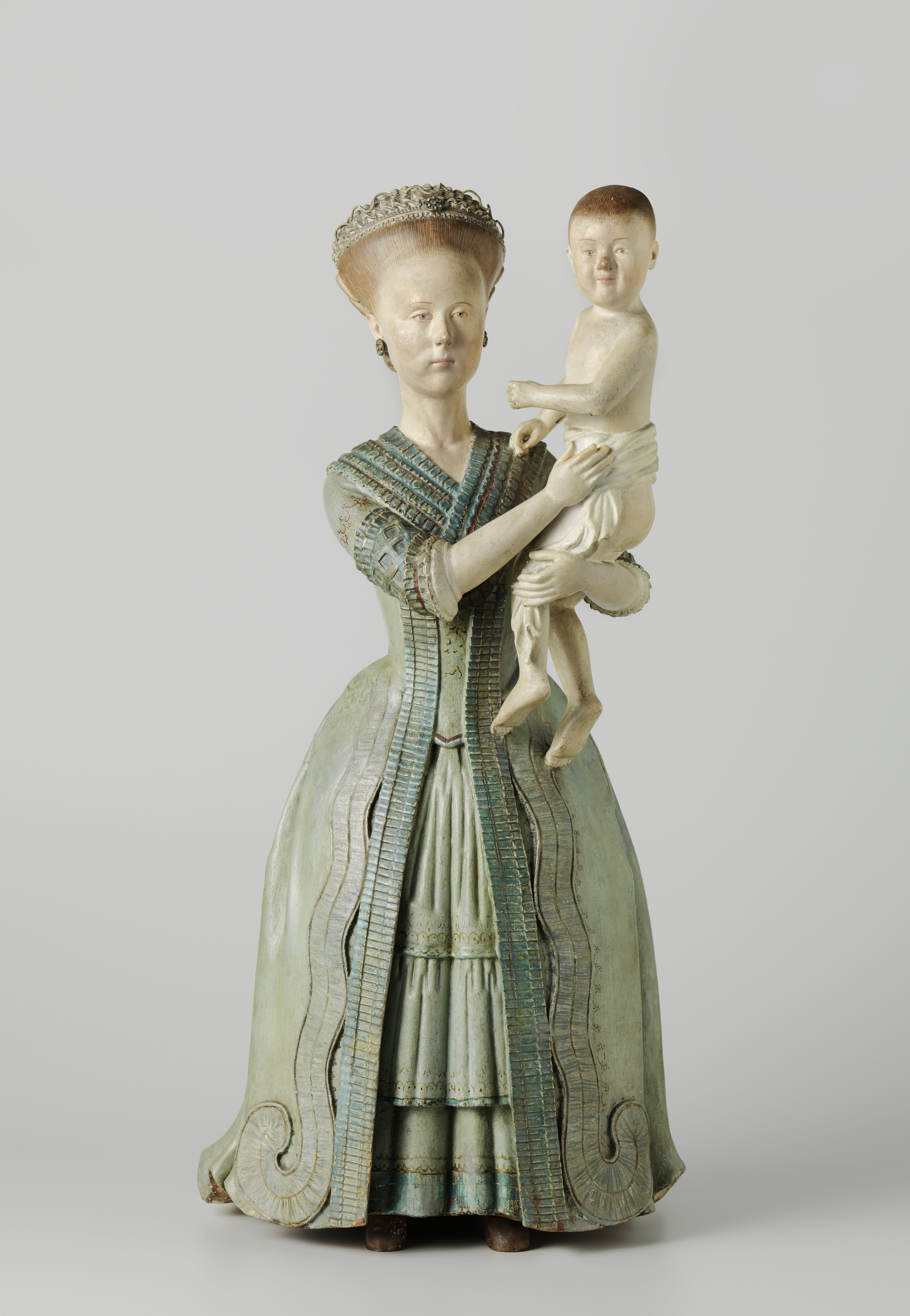
Polychrome wooden sculpture of a western lady holding a child, attributed to Chitqua, c. 1775, Rijksmuseum.

Tan-Che-Qua (alternatively, Tan Chitqua or Tan Chetqua; c. 1728 – 1796) was a Chinese artist who visited England from 1769 to 1772. He exhibited his work at the Royal Academy in 1770, and his clay models became fashionable in London for a short period. He returned to China in 1772. After the merchant Loum Kiqua in 1756–1757, and the Christian convert Michael Shen Fuzong in 1687, Tan-Che-Qua is one of the earliest Chinese people known to have visited England.

== Career ==
Tan-Che-Qua was probably born in Guangdong in China, around 1728. He became an artist and clay modeller in Canton, making clay portrait figures.

In his middle years, Tan-Che-Qua arrived in London from Canton on 11 August 1769 on the East Indiaman Horsendon. The Chinese authorities had given him permission to travel to Batavia (now Jakarta), but he went to England instead. He lived in lodgings on the Strand, where he worked as a clay modeller, creating busts for 10 guineas and small statuettes for 15 guineas. One of the few known surviving examples of his work is a figurine of physician Anthony Askew, held by the Royal College of Physicians. The Museum of London has another attributed to Tan-Che-Qua of the London merchant Thomas Todd; the Rijksmuseum in Amsterdam has one of the Dutch merchant Andreas Everardus van Braam Houckgeest; and one of David Garrick is in a private collection, which is confirmed not out of his hand but that of another Chinese modeller working in Canton in the 1730s.

He attended an audience with George III and Queen Charlotte. He also attended meetings at the Royal Academy of Arts and exhibited work there in 1770. He was included in a group portrait of the Royal Academicians by Johann Zoffany. A portrait of Tan-Che-Qua, thought to be the one exhibited by John Hamilton Mortimer at the annual exhibition of the Incorporated Society of Artists in 1771, is held by the Hunterian Museum at the Royal College of Surgeons in London. The portrait was misidentified as Wang-y-tong, another Chinese visitor to London in the 1770s, who attended meetings of the Royal Society. He was also sketched by Charles Grignion the Younger.

He visited the library of the British Museum on at least three occasions, in December 1770 and January 1771. While there, he examined the library’s collection of Chinese and Japanese books and manuscripts, which no-one had been able to decipher until then. As far as he was able, he provided the librarians with short descriptions of the contents of the books, which were written down on the book covers.

He boarded the East Indiaman Grenville in March 1771, intending to return to China. After a series of accidents the crew took against him and he disembarked at Deal, Kent. He returned to China in 1772. The Gentleman's Magazine reported that he committed suicide in Canton in the mid-1790s. According to the RKD he died in Guangzhou in 1796.

== Legacy ==
Sir William Chambers used his name – Tan Chet-qua – for the narrator of his Explanatory Discourse by Tan Chet-qua, of Quang-Chew-fu, Gent., an appendix to the second edition (1773) of his book on Chinese gardening, Dissertation on Oriental Gardening (1772), a fanciful elaboration of contemporary English ideas about the naturalistic style of gardening in China.
