= Ernest Suckling =

English cricketer

Personal information
- Born: 27 March 1890; Balsall Heath, Worcestershire, England
- Died: 24 February 1962 (aged 71); Stanley Park, Blackpool, England
- Batting: Left-handed
- Bowling: Slow left-arm orthodox

Domestic team information
- Years: Team
- 1919: Warwickshire
- 1923–1924: Worcestershire

Career statistics
Competition	First-class
Matches	5
Runs scored	130
Batting average	18.57
100s/50s	0/1
Top score	58
Balls bowled	139
Wickets	4
Bowling average	32.25
5 wickets in innings	0
10 wickets in match	0
Best bowling	4/71
Catches/stumpings	1/–
- Source: CricketArchive, 1 August 2008

Ernest Suckling (27 March 1890 – 24 February 1962) was an English first-class cricketer who played in five matches for Warwickshire and Worcestershire in the years after the First World War, having played Second XI cricket for Warwickshire as long ago as 1910.

Suckling made his debut for Warwickshire against Yorkshire at Edgbaston in June 1919; he scored 2 and 4 and bowled three wicketless overs. He also appeared for his county in a non-Championship game against Worcestershire in August, when he made 39 from number ten in the order in a drawn match.

He did not appear at first-class level again until 1923, when he made the first of his three appearances for Worcestershire: two that season and one in 1924. On his Worcestershire debut, against Lancashire, he took 4-71, the only first-class wickets of his career, including those of Test players Jack Sharp and Cecil Parkin. In Suckling's next game, against Kent at Dudley, he produced his only half-century, making 58. He ended his first-class career on a low note versus Gloucestershire: after 0* in the first innings, he was dismissed for 0 by Percy Mills.

Suckling played in the Lancashire League as the club professional for Enfield Cricket Club in 1925.
