= Paul Adams (journalist) =

British journalist

Paul Adams is a correspondent for the BBC World Affairs Unit, based in London. He previously served as the BBC's world affairs correspondent in London, before moving to Washington D.C. He regularly reports for BBC News, BBC World News, BBC Radio and the BBC One bulletins from various locations around the world.

== Early life ==
Adams was born in Lebanon in 1961, where his father served as Middle East correspondent for The Guardian, a United Kingdom-published national newspaper. His family eventually settled in the United Kingdom, living in Sussex and Kent.

== Education ==
Adams was educated at Sevenoaks School, an independent school in the town of Sevenoaks in Kent, followed by the University of York, where he studied English.

== Life and career ==
After two years spent teaching English in Yemen, Adams began his journalism career freelancing for local papers in the United States, while road-tripping across the country. In 1989, he joined the BBC's Arabic service, based in London. Later that year, Adams moved to Jerusalem as the BBC's world service correspondent. He reported on a wide variety of events in the Middle East, including the Gulf War. In 1993, he moved to Belgrade to cover the conflicts in the former Yugoslavia before returning to London in 1995 as a reporter for BBC World television.

In 1997, Adams returned to Jerusalem as the BBC's Middle East correspondent where he reported on events ranging from Israel's withdrawal from southern Lebanon to the Pope's historic visit to Israel, and the dawning of the year 2000 in Bethlehem. He has covered Middle Eastern and world affairs extensively during his time as the BBC's defence correspondent following the 9/11 attacks, the wars in Afghanistan and Iraq. In 2003, he was based in US Central Command (Centcom) in Qatar. From 2004 to 2009, he served first as a diplomatic correspondent and later as a world affairs correspondent based in London, where he reported on, among other topics, the G8, NATO and China.

In 2009, Adams moved to the United States to serve as a Washington correspondent for the BBC World Service. He reported for the BBC from Chicago during the bid for the 2016 Olympic Games.

On 5 October 2014, Adams and his TV crew came under attack from the Turkish police with tear gas near Kobane, No-one was hurt in the incident.
