= Ernie Toser =

English footballer

Personal information
- Full name: Ernest William Toser
- Date of birth: 30 November 1912
- Place of birth: London, England
- Date of death: 25 March 2002 (aged 89)
- Place of death: Hastings, England
- Height: 6 ft 0 in (1.83 m)
- Position: Centre half

Youth career
- Tottenham Hotspur

Senior career*
Years	Team	Apps	(Gls)
- Eton Manor
- Redhill
1932–1937	Dulwich Hamlet		
1937–1946	Millwall	2	(0)
1946–1947	Notts County	2	(0)
1947–1948	Bognor Regis		

International career
1927	England Schoolboys	1	(0)

Managerial career
- 1947–1948: Bognor Regis
- * Club domestic league appearances and goals

Ernest William Toser (30 November 1912 – 25 March 2002) was an English professional footballer who played in the Football League for Millwall and Notts County as a centre half. He is best remembered for his time in non-League football with Dulwich Hamlet, for whom he served as a player and a member of the backroom staff.

== Personal life ==
Toser served in the Royal Air Force during the Second World War. He also served as a PE instructor at Sevenoaks School and later worked as a teacher.

== Career statistics ==
Appearances and goals by club, season and competition
Club	Season	League			FA Cup		Total	
Club	Season	Division	Apps	Goals	Apps	Goals	Apps	Goals
Notts County	1946–47	Third Division North	2	0	0	0	2	0
Career total			2	0	0	0	2	0

== Honours ==
Dulwich Hamlet

- FA Amateur Cup: 1933–34, 1936–37
