= Kim Taylor (educationalist) =

Len Clive "Kim" Taylor (4 August 1922 in Kolkata – 20 July 2013 in Chichester) was a British Educationalist. He was headmaster at Sevenoaks School before being appointed as Director of the Resources for Learning Project at the Nuffield Foundation. He then worked at the Centre for Educational Resources and Innovation.

Taylor was born in India under the British Raj. However he was sent to boarding school in England at the age of six, rarely seeing his parents after that. When Kim was nine his father died and the following year he started to attend Sevenoaks School, which he soon regarded as home. When the Second World War commenced, Taylor was 17. He returned to India, taking up a teaching post at St Paul's School, Darjeeling. In 1942 he was commissioned into the Indian Army and served in Burma campaign, being evacuated from Akyab.

== Works ==
- (1971) Resources for Learning London: Penguin Books Ltd
- (1972) Learning Resources Association of Colleges for Further and Higher Education
