= Portrait of Wang-y-tong =

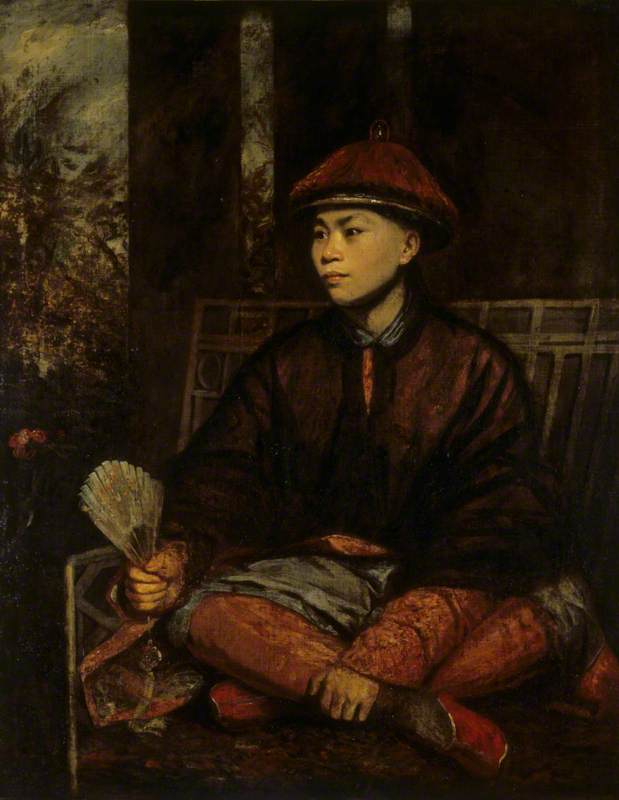
- Artist: Joshua Reynolds
- Year: 1776
- Medium: Oil on canvas
- Location: Knole, Kent, England

Portrait of Wang-y-tong is a 1776 oil on canvas painting by Sir Joshua Reynolds (1723–1792).

It is a portrait of Wang-y-tong, one of the earliest Chinese persons to have visited England. He was brought to England by John Bradby Blake, a botanist who was employed as a supercargo by the English East India Company.

The painting was commissioned by John Sackville, 3rd Duke of Dorset and is exhibited in the Reynolds Room at his acquired estate, Knole in Kent, alongside portraits of other 18th century celebrities by Reynolds, including the Duke, Reynolds himself, Samuel Johnson, and David Garrick.

Wang is depicted sitting cross-legged on a bamboo chair, holding a fan, and wearing crimson and blue oriental robes, red shoes and a conical Asian hat. He has been described as a living example of chinoiserie.
