= Alan Hurd =

English cricketer

Personal information
- Born: 7 September 1937; Ilford, Essex, England
- Died: 11 April 2016 (aged 78)
- Batting: Left-handed
- Bowling: Right-arm off-spin
- Role: Bowler

Domestic team information
- Years: Team
- 1958–1960: Essex

Career statistics
Competition	FC
Matches	90
Runs scored	376
Batting average	5.37
100s/50s	0/0
Top score	21
Balls bowled	17073
Wickets	249
Bowling average	30.80
5 wickets in innings	13
10 wickets in match	1
Best bowling	6/15
Catches/stumpings	16/0
- Source: Cricinfo, 19 July 2013

Alan Hurd (7 September 1937 – 11 April 2016) was an English first-class cricketer who played for Essex.

Hurd was educated at Chigwell School and Clare College, Cambridge. An off-spin bowler, he played for Cambridge University and Essex from 1958 to 1960. His best innings and match figures came in his first match for Essex, when he took 6 for 15 and 4 for 62 in a victory over Kent.

After his first-class cricket career he taught English at Sevenoaks School. He also coached the school cricket team. He retired as Head of English and Senior Master in January 1997.
