= Sevenoaks School =

Public school in Sevenoaks, Kent, England

Coordinates: 51°15′54″N 0°11′42″E

- Seal of the school
- Sevenoaks, Kent, TN13 1HU; England

Information
- Type: Public school Private day and boarding school
- Motto: Servire Deo Regnari Est (To serve God is to be ruled, or To serve God is to rule. (No longer in use.))
- Religious affiliation: Non-denominational
- Established: 1432; 594 years ago
- Founder: William Sevenoke
- Department for Education URN: 118952 Tables
- Chairman of the Governors: Alison Beckett
- Head: Jesse Elzinga
- Staff: Around 500
- Gender: Mixed
- Age: 11 to 18
- Enrolment: 1200
- Houses: Aisher, New House, Girls' International House, Park Grange, International Centre, Sennocke House, Johnsons, School House
- Colours: Blue, red and white
- Alumni: Old Sennockians
- School seal: Sigillum Commune Scole Gramaticalis de Sevenok in Com Kance (Latin for 'Common Seal of Sevenoaks Grammar School in the County of Kent')
- Website: sevenoaksschool.org

Sevenoaks School is a private school. It is co-educational, a private boarding and day school, located in Sevenoaks, Kent, England.

Established in 1432, it is the second oldest non-denominational school in the United Kingdom, only behind Oswestry (1407). It is among the UK's leading schools, and has annual boarding fees in excess of £53,500, making it one of the most expensive schools in the country. It is a registered charity.

As of 2025, it is among the top 5 International Baccalaureate schools in the United Kingdom, and top 15 in the world.

Around 1,200 day pupils and boarders attend, ranging in age from 11 to 18 years. There are approximately equal numbers of boys and girls. In 2006 it became the first major UK school to switch entirely from A level exams to the International Baccalaureate.

== History ==
Founded as a grammar school by William Sevenoke in 1432 as a part of his last will and testament, the school was intended to give a classical education to boys in the area on free of charge and free of church constrictions. Sevenoke's will also provided for almshouses for poor men and women. Sevenoaks School is one of the oldest lay foundations in England. Sevenoke was Mayor of London and, as a friend of Henry V, may have been influenced by the MP for Shropshire and King's pleader, David Holbache, who founded Oswestry in 1407. According to William Lambarde and Richard Johnson (Nine Worthies of London), Sevenoke was a foundling, whose decision to establish the school and almshouses may have been inspired by his early history.

Sevenoaks School Act 1597
- Act of Parliament
- Parliament of England
- Long title: An Acte concerning the Schoole at Sevenake.
- Citation: 39 Eliz. 1. c. 13 Pr.
- Territorial extent: England and Wales

Dates
- Royal assent: 9 February 1598
- Commencement: 24 October 1597 (Note: Start of session.)

Status: Current legislation

In 1560, in response to a petition by Ralph Bosville and Sevenoaks parishioners, Elizabeth I issued letters patent incorporating the school, giving it the right to use her name, and changing its governance. A seal was issued bearing Bosville's initials and the motto Servire Deo Regnari Est. Ralph Bosville was Clerk of the Court of Wards and Liveries, a JP and owner of the Manor of Bradbourne near Sevenoaks, and under the conditions of the letters patent, he and his heirs were to serve on the governing body as long as they lived in Kent. He has been described as the school's 'second founder'. Supporting the letters patent, statues and ordinances were issued in 1574 and a private act of Parliament, the Sevenoaks School Act 1597 (39 Eliz. 1. c. 13 Pr.) passed in February 1598. The school also received a number of bequests during the sixteenth century and during this period was brought to wider attention by William Lambarde's A Perambulation of Kent (1576).

The school is thought to have been initially housed in small buildings near the present site, before an official school house was built. Rebuilding took place in 1631, under the supervision of Thomas Pett. It was again rebuilt in 1724, to the designs of Lord Burlington, a friend of the headmaster of the time, Elijah Fenton. Building work was completed in 1732. During this period the Master and scholars were housed outside the town.

The school remained small until the late 19th century. School records show that between 1716 and 1748, under the headmastership of the Revd Simpson, school numbers dropped from 'a great many scholars' to only four boys. Simpson resigned and was replaced by Edward Holme, a distant relative of Sir Richard Burton. By 1778 there were around 60 pupils, and the same is indicated in the School Inquiry Commission of 1868.

In 1884 the governors appointed Daniel Birkett as headmaster. It was Birkett's vision to elevate the school's status to that of a First Grade Classical School. He started this revolution, reducing the number of free places to the townfolk and expanding boarding. When he resigned in the 1890s the school had over 100 boys. Birkett's revolution was continued by George Heslop who increased the size to a peak of 134 boys, although numbers dropped towards the end of the First World War (during which 350 Old Sennockians enlisted). Geoffrey Garrod followed Heslop in 1919. In the same year, the headmaster's wife, Mrs Garrod, started a new school for younger boys; Sevenoaks Prep School started with six pupils in the school Cottage Block. An element of selection entered the admissions process in the early 1920s.

James Higgs-Walker succeeded Garrod in 1924. Higgs-Walker introduced day houses, expanded school sports and extracurricular activities and expanded the school with the help of the school's benefactor, Charles Plumptre Johnson, who was a governor from 1913 to 1923 and chairman from 1923 to his death in 1938. Johnson donated many gifts to the school with his brother, Edward: *The Flagpole, 1924, *Thornhill, 1924 (Johnson's House), *Johnson's Hall, 1936 (Now Johnson's Library), *The Sanitorium, 1938, *Park Grange and the surrounding estate, 1946.

Higgs-Walker led the school until 1956 when he was succeeded by Kim Taylor. During Taylor's headship the school became more prominent nationally through Taylor's introduction of a number of innovative teaching methodologies, "Mr. Taylor, the Headmaster, has built so successfully on the work of his predecessor that in the ten years he has been at Sevenoaks it has changed from an old-established minor public school ... into an experimental outpost of the Headmasters' Conference."

The school was a pioneer in the introduction of 'The New Maths', an approach to teaching the subject which made it less abstract, and more engaging for pupils. The school adopted the textbooks and examination regime of the School Mathematics Project (SMP) which had been pioneered at a number of other private schools.

The final period of every Wednesday was set aside for the sixth form to attend lectures, usually with a current affairs theme. Speakers have included public figures such as trade union leaders Ray Buckton (ASLEF) and Hugh Scanlon (AEU), boxer Henry Cooper, philosopher A. J. Ayer and astronomer Patrick Moore.

In 1968, Taylor was succeeded by Michael Hinton who was himself succeeded by Alan Tammadge in 1971.

In 1976, the school first admitted girls and moved from being a single-sex school to a co-educational one.

In 2012, the independent review of A level and IB results, based on government issued statistics, ranked Sevenoaks School first in the UK, ahead of Westminster (17th), St Paul's (22nd), Harrow (34th), Winchester (73rd) and Eton (80th).

In 2025, Sevenoaks School merged with Solefield School, a local co-educational prep school, providing an education for pupils aged from three to 18. While keeping their respective uniforms and leadership teams, the schools share expertise in areas such as teaching, pastoral care and facilities.

The Sevenoaks School is a former member of the G20 Schools group.

== Academic ==
IB results:

In 2025 the average IB Diploma score at Sevenoaks School was 39.4 points (around 10 points above the world average), with a cohort of 245 students, of which more than half earned 40 points or more. Eleven students achieved the maximum Diploma score of 45 points.

GCSE results:

In 2025, 90 per cent of all GCSEs were graded 9/8/7 or A*/A. 45 per cent of all examinations were graded 9. 112 students gained 10 or more 9/8/7 or A*/A grades, and of those, 17 gained 10 or more top grades of 9 (or A*).

== Facilities ==
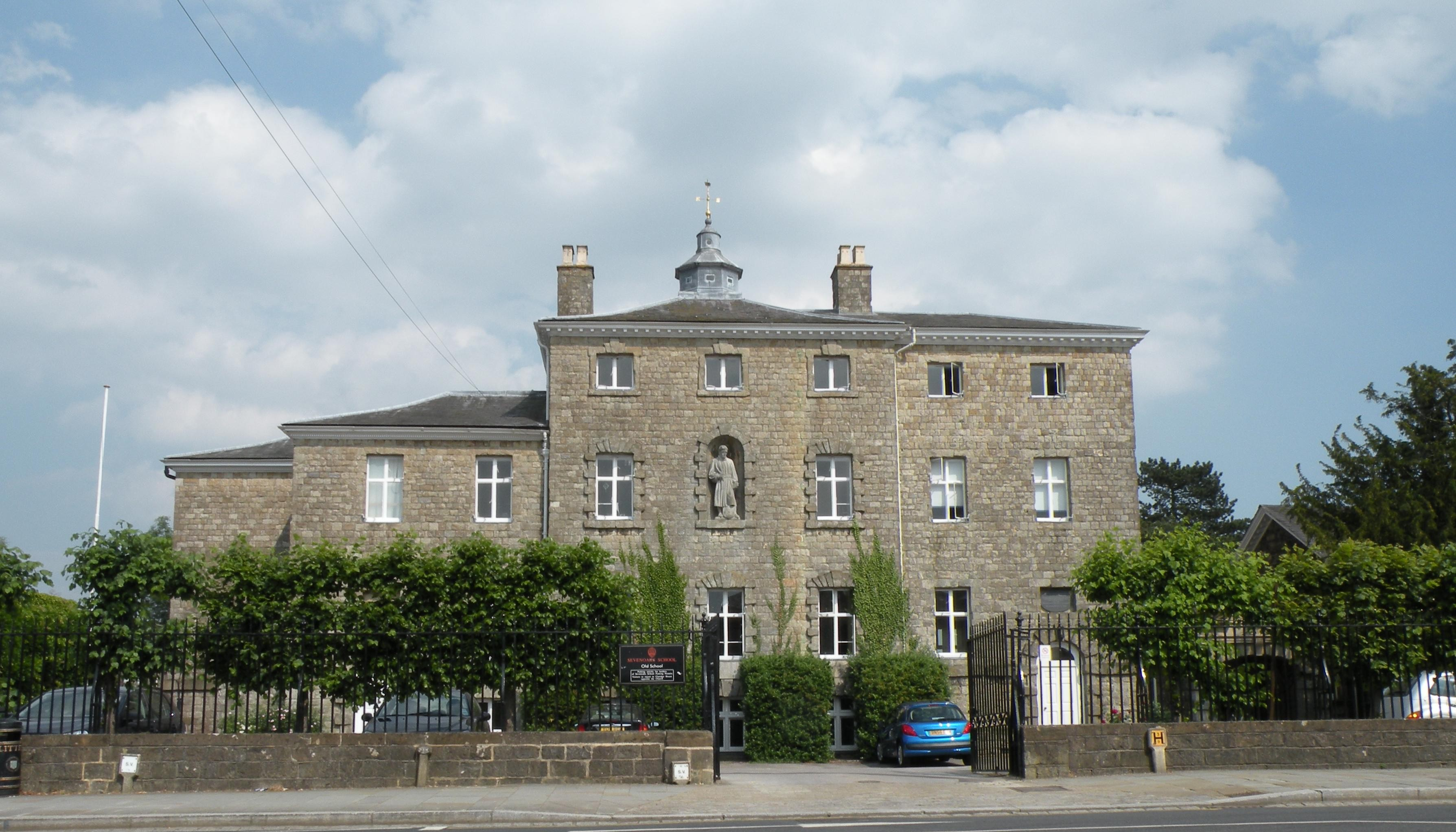
Old School at Sevenoaks

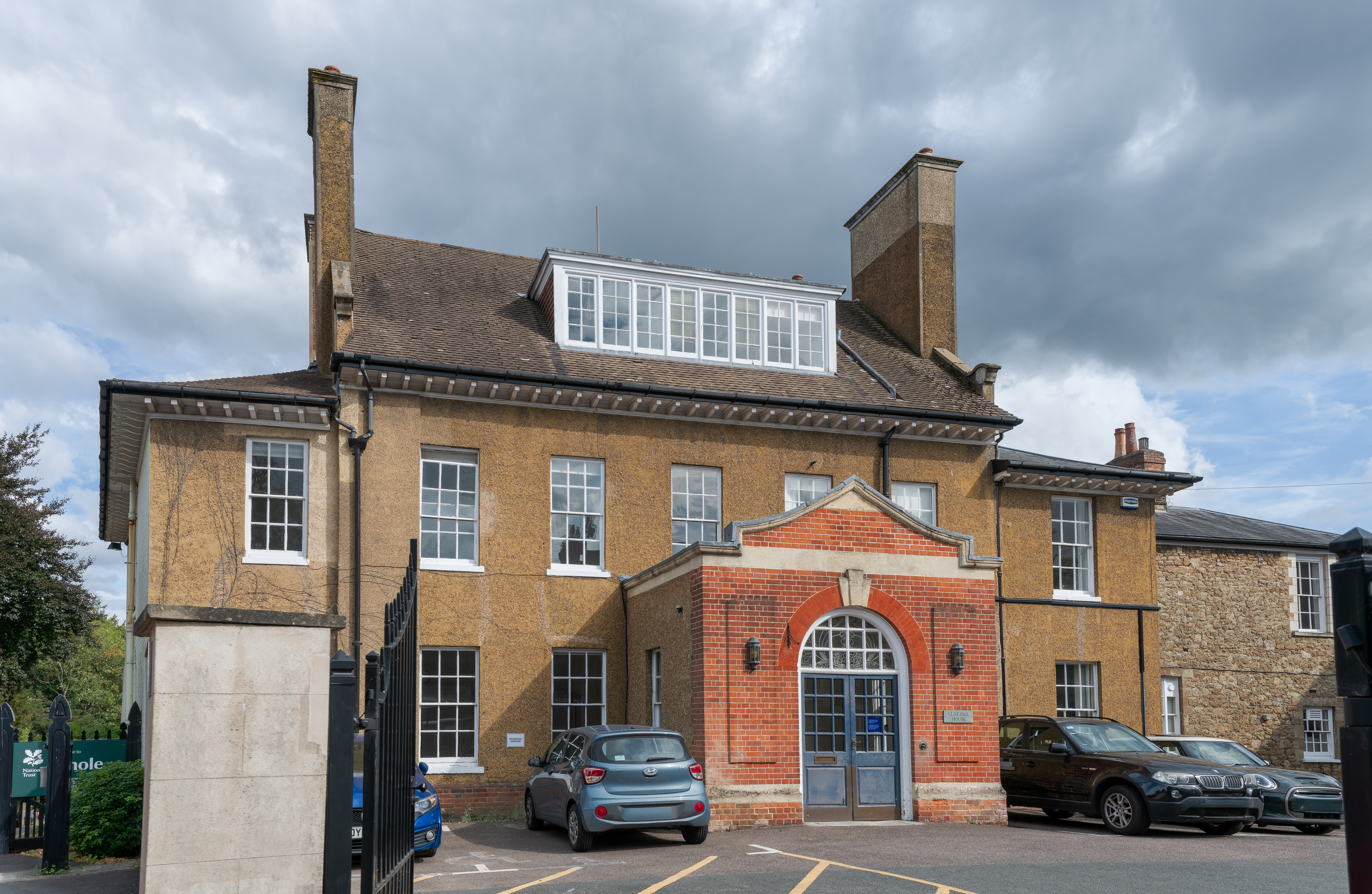
Claridge House, formerly the home of architect Sydney Perks

Three buildings were constructed for the school prior to the 20th century – Old School (formerly School House, which was built with the Almshouses in the early 18th century in the Palladian style and designed by Lord Burlington), the old Assembly Hall (1890) now part of the Swanzy Block, and the Cottage Block (late 19th century). Additional early buildings, previously private houses, include Park Grange (mid-19th century), Girls International House (c.1700), Claridge House (18th century), Manor House (late 18th century), and Temple House (1884). In April 2010, a new 13-million pound performing arts centre, The Space, was opened on the school campus. The Space was designed by Tim Ronalds Architects with Price & Myers acting as consulting engineers and has won several awards: the Commercial & Public Access category in the 2010 Wood Awards, Best Education Building in the 2010 Brick Awards, and an RIBA Award (South East Region) in 2011. It was also nominated for Best Public Building award of the 2012 Kent Design Awards.

In 2018, the school opened a new Science and Technology Centre, also designed by Tim Ronalds Architects. The building was awarded a RIBA South East Award 2019, RIBA South East Client of the Year Award 2019 and RIBA National Award 2019. It houses laboratories, the Technology department, Sixth Form Common room and a large multi-purpose space. The RIBA Jury described it as “... great cathedral of a space, full of life and light” The school has a sports centre, the Sennocke Centre, which includes a swimming pool, three tennis courts, two sports halls, climbing wall, squash courts, gym and dance studio.

== Controversies ==
=== Fee-fixing cartel ===
Between 2001 and 2004, Sevenoaks School orchestrated the 'private school fee fixing scandal', a fee-fixing cartel involving fifty prominent independent schools in the United Kingdom. It was subsequently found guilty of operating a fee-fixing cartel by the Office of Fair Trading. The Independent Schools Council – a lobby group funded by the independent schools in question – said that the investigation had been "a scandalous waste of public money".

=== Inflation of predicted grades ===
In June 2020, The Guardian reported that, as formally codified as a school policy in the staff handbook, Sevenoaks School had for 'many years' exaggerated the predicted exam results of '1 in 12' of its students (20 per year).

This policy was outlined in full in July 2020 by The Daily Telegraph, which revealed that 'in around 20 cases a year' the school inflated predicted grades 'to facilitate the application' of the student to university. Mary Curnock Cook commented that it was 'embarrassing for Sevenoaks that deliberately over predicting students’ grades is in writing in their guidelines'.

The Charity Commission stated that it had engaged with the school over 'a broad set of concerns including predictions' and 'governance concerns', with which investigation the school said it was 'cooperating fully'. UCAS confirmed that it had already sent the school a reminder of its guidelines, and the Department for Education warned that 'Schools should not be inflating predicted grades'. The school 'refuted any suggestion that we would unfairly exaggerate UCAS predictions' and then announced that it would edit the staff handbook to 'ensure there is no confusion'. Furthermore, after initially stating that its accuracy in predicting grades 'significantly outperformed the national average', the school clarified that its predictions did not outperform the national average. The International Baccalaureate stated that the last five years of predictions were 'in line with' results. Robert Sackville-West, 7th Baron Sackville, who sits on the UK board of the International Baccalaureate, was Chair of Trustees at the school from 2002 until 2008, and since 2012 has been Chair of the Trustees of the Sevenoaks School Foundation, a charity that acts as the fundraising arm of the school.

On 25 June 2020, Shadow Education Secretary Mike Watson, Baron Watson of Invergowrie posed a written question to the Conservative Party in the House of Lords, asking 'what discussions they have had with Sevenoaks School'. Elizabeth Berridge, Baroness Berridge, Parliamentary Under-Secretary of the Department for Education, replied that 'the school has been reminded about [UCAS] guidelines' and that 'Schools should not be inflating predicted grades.'

== In literature ==
- Sevenoaks schoolmaster William Painter introduced his translation of William Fulke's Antiprognosticon (1560) with a letter written from Sevenoaks.
- The finding of William Sevenoke is described by William Lambarde in A Perambulation of Kent (1576).
- William Camden mentions the school and almshouses in Britannia (1586).
- A school tradition, cited in the prospectus and school history, maintains that Sevenoaks is the 'grammar school' of Jack Cade's speech in Henry VI Part 2, Act 4, scene 7. Jonathan Bate would appear to support this (The Genius of Shakespeare, 1997).
- William Sevenoke is one of Richard Johnson's Nine Worthies of London (1592).
- John Stow refers to William Sevenoke's civic roles and the founding of the school and almshouses in his Survey of London (1603), as does Anthony Munday in A Brief Chronicle (1611).
- Daniel Defoe refers to the school in A tour through the whole island of Great Britain (1724–27).
- John Wesley preached 'at an open place near the Free-School', on Saturday, 4 October 1746. (Journal of the Rev John Wesley)
- Maurice Henry Hewlett reflects on friendships of his schooldays in Lore of Proserpine (1913).
- The Sevenoaks education of Huang Ya Dong (Wang Y Tong) and the son of John Frederick Sackville and Giovanna Baccelli is mentioned in Vita Sackville-West's Knole and the Sackvilles (1922).
- Charlie Higson's fictional boarding school, Rowhurst (The Dead, 2010) was inspired by Sevenoaks.
- In Ian McEwan's novel Sweet Tooth (2012), the character Tom Haley is described as 'the product of a good grammar school, Sevenoaks'.

== Notable alumni ==
Former pupils are known as "Old Sennockians".

=== Academics and scientists ===
- Sir Jonathan Bate, academic, biographer and critic
- Mark Brouard, professor of chemistry
- Simon Donaldson, mathematician
- Francis Everitt, professor of physics, Stanford University
- Emily Greenwood, professor of Classics and the University Center for Human Values
- George Grote, historian
- David Kear (geologist), geologist
- Noel Kingsbury, writer on gardening and plant science
- Paddy Lowe, motor racing engineer
- Tom McLeish, theoretical physicist
- Philip Ruffles, aerospace engineer, former Director of Engineering and Technology of Rolls-Royce plc
- Max Saunders, academic specialising in modern literature and culture
- Jonael Schickler, philosopher
- Oliver Taplin, professor
- Nigel Warburton, philosopher
- Nick Wirth, automotive engineer and former owner of the Simtek Formula One team

=== Activists, diplomats and politicians ===
- Jonathan Evans, Baron Evans of Weardale, former Director General of MI5
- Stephen Hale, Chief Executive of Refugee Action
- Michael Holmes, former leader of UK Independence Party
- Isa Ibrahim, Bruneian lawyer and politician
- Raşit Pertev, Turkish Cypriot development practitioner, politician and writer
- Colwyn Philipps, 3rd Viscount St Davids, British peer, Conservative Party politician and Deputy Speaker of the House of Lords
- Christopher Prout, Baron Kingsland, British barrister and Conservative Party politician
- Sir Jonathan Stephens, civil servant
- Tristram Stuart, author and campaigner
- Ben Summerskill, lobbyist, Director of the Criminal Justice Alliance
- Peter Thomson (diplomat), former President of the United Nations General Assembly
- Colin Vereker, 8th Viscount Gort, Irish peer and member of the House of Keys
- Caroline Wilson (diplomat), British Ambassador to China

=== Arts and entertainment ===
- Inji, singer
- Tanis, singer songwriter and composer
- Adam Curtis, filmmaker
- Daniel Day-Lewis, actor
- Clive Dunn, actor
- Tom Edge, screenwriter
- Clive Farahar, antiquarian book specialist, dealer, expert on the BBC's Antiques Roadshow
- Daniel Flynn (actor), actor
- Andy Gill, musician
- Brett Goldstein, actor, comedian, writer
- Aryan Khan, voice actor, screenwriter, filmmaker, entrepreneur
- Andrew Gourlay, conductor
- Tom Greenhalgh, musician
- Paul Greengrass, director and filmmaker
- Emma Johnson, clarinetist
- Jon King, musician
- James McVinnie, organist and pianist
- Joe Stilgoe, singer, pianist and songwriter
- Geoffrey Streatfeild, actor
- The Webb Sisters, Charley and Hattie Webb, musicians
- Helen Zaltzman, broadcaster and writer
- Jess Search, documentary producer
- Agastya Nanda, actor

=== Artists and designers ===
- Charles Barry Jr., architect
- Will Burrard-Lucas, wildlife photographer
- Lucy Cousins, illustrator and author
- Thomas Heatherwick, designer
- Emma Hope, British shoe designer
- Simon Starling, winner of the 2005 Turner Prize

=== Business ===
- Parth Jindal, managing director of JSW Cement and JSW Paints
- Jill McDonald, CEO of Costa Coffee and former CEO of Halfords

=== Church leaders ===
- Thomas Comber, Dean of Durham
- John Frith, martyr and translator of the New Testament
- Clive Gregory, Bishop of Wolverhampton
- Edward Perronet, hymn-writer, itinerant Wesleyan preacher
- Alan Wilson (bishop), Bishop of Buckingham
- Charles Wordsworth, churchman, scholar and schoolmaster

=== Journalists, writers and publishers ===
- Paul Adams, journalist
- Tanya Arnold, sports journalist
- Mick Audsley, film editor
- John Bowdler the Younger, essayist, poet and lawyer
- Olivia Cole, journalist and poet
- Sarah Harrison, investigative journalist, staff member of WikiLeaks
- Maurice Henry Hewlett, author
- Charlie Higson, comedian and author
- Sonny Mehta, editor, former head of Alfred A Knopf
- Plum Sykes, author
- Elleston Trevor, author and playwright

=== Military ===
- Henry Hardinge, 1st Viscount Hardinge, field marshal and statesman
- Patrick Heenan, Captain in the British Indian Army who was convicted of treason and executed after spying for Japan during the Malayan campaign of World War II
- Vice Admiral Gordon McLintock (USMS), the 4th and longest serving superintendent of the United States Merchant Marine Academy
- Martin Smith, former Commandant General Royal Marines
- Charles Stickland, former Commandant General Royal Marines
- Arthur Herbert Thompson, English soldier and amateur footballer

=== Royalty ===
- Sir Timothy Laurence, vice admiral and husband of Princess Anne, The Princess Royal
- Prince Amedeo of Belgium, Archduke of Austria-Este, grandson of King Albert II of Belgium and nephew to Philippe King of the Belgians
- Princess Luisa Maria of Belgium, Archduchess of Austria-Este, granddaughter of King Albert II of Belgium and niece to Philippe King of the Belgians
- Princess Elisabeth von Thurn und Taxis, daughter of Johannes, 11th Prince of Thurn and Taxis

=== Sports ===
- Christina Bassadone, Olympic sailor
- Daniel Caprice, rugby union player
- Paul Downton, cricketer
- Tash Farrant, cricketer
- James Graham-Brown, cricketer
- Tony Roques, Rugby union player
- Robby Swift, windsurfer
- Chris Tavaré, cricketer (ex biology teacher at the school)
- Horace Taylor, cricketer
- Andy Titterrell, rugby union player
- Ian Walker, Olympic sailor

=== Other ===
- Huang Ya Dong, early Chinese visitor to England
- C. W. R. Knight, British falconer and writer
- Emma Slade, charity founder, Buddhist nun and writer

== Former staff ==
- Jonty Driver (English teacher 1964–5, Housemaster of the International Sixth Form Centre 1967–73), writer, who wrote a book about his experiences at the school
- Elijah Fenton, poet, biographer, translator and schoolmaster of Sevenoaks School
- Don Foster, Baron Foster of Bath, British politician
- Chris Greenhalgh, writer
- James Higgs-Walker, cricketer and headmaster of Sevenoaks School
- Alan Hurd, cricketer
- James Jones, former Bishop of Liverpool
- Chris Tavaré, retired English international cricketer
- Kim Taylor, educationalist and headmaster of Sevenoaks School
- Ernie Toser, English professional footballer

== See also ==
- List of the oldest schools in the United Kingdom
