= Horace Taylor (cricketer) =

English cricketer

Personal information
- Full name: Horace James Taylor
- Born: 26 December 1895; Sevenoaks, Kent
- Died: 13 October 1961 (aged 65); Tunbridge Wells, Kent
- Batting: Right-handed
- Bowling: Right-arm medium

Domestic team information
- Years: Team
- 1922–1925: Kent

Career statistics
Competition	First-class
Matches	12
Runs scored	181
Batting average	18.10
100s/50s	0/0
Top score	33
Catches/stumpings	2/–
- Source: CricInfo, 5 December 2015

Horace James Taylor (26 November 1895 – 13 October 1961) was an English cricketer who played for Kent County Cricket Club during the 1920s. He served in the British Army during World War I and later worked in the British Colonial Office, spending a number of years working in Africa as an agricultural officer.

== Early life ==
Taylor was born at Sevenoaks in Kent in 1895, the son of Alfred Taylor, a saddle and harness maker in the town, and his wife Emma (née Hills). He was educated as a day boy at Sevenoaks School where he was in the cricket XI. After leaving school in 1912 he worked as a bank clerk until the outbreak of World War I.

== Military service ==
In August 1914, soon after the start of the war, Taylor enlisted in the British Army, joining the West Kent Yeomanry, a Territorial Force cavalry unit. He chose to sign up for overseas service, (Note: Members of the Territorial Force were only obliged to serve on the home front at the start of the war. Many men signed up for Imperial Service, meaning that they could be sent overseas.) and in late 1915 served during the Gallipoli Campaign with the West Kents. (Note: The 1st battalion West Kent Yeomanry served in a dismounted role during the Gallipoli Campaign, acting as infantry.)

In December 1915 the West Kents were evacuated from Gallipoli, moving to serve in Egypt. Taylor spent the majority of the rest of the war in the Middle East, initially involved in the defence works along the Suez Canal. During mid-1916 the West Kents were committed to the Western Desert campaign, including in actions to suppress the Senussi which lasted until early 1917.

The following year, Taylor saw action during the Palestine Campaign of 1917–18. He served at the Third Battle of Gaza, in the campaign which led to capture of Beersheba, and in the Battle of Jerusalem during 1917. By this time the West Kent and East Kent Yeomanry had been combined to form the 10th battalion, Royal East Kent Regiment, and served as regular infantry in the 74th (Yeomanry) Division. After opening early 1918 involved in the defence of Jerusalem, the division was transferred to France, arriving at Marseille in early May. Taylor spent little time in France after bring selected for officer training in England. He ended the war at a training depot at Larkhill in Wiltshire.

== Cricket ==
After scoring two centuries for Kent's Club and Ground team, and another in the Minor Counties Championship for the Second XI during the early part of the 1922 season, Taylor made his first-class cricket debut at the beginning of July against Warwickshire at Edgbaston. He scored 30 runs on debut, and played in the next four matches in the 1922 County Championship, making a total of 96 runs in four innings, (Note: Taylor did not bat during Kent's innings win against Northants and batted only once in each of the other matches which he played in.) including scoring 33 against Sussex at Tunbridge Wells and 23 not out against Warwickshire at Maidstone. He dropped out of the team towards the end of July, although he continued to play for the Second XI throughout the remainder of the season and was the reserve team's leading run scorer during 1922.

Three First XI appearances in May 1923 saw Taylor score only 21 runs in four innings, and he did not play for Kent at all during the following season. He returned to the team in 1925, making four appearances for the First XI during May and early June, scoring 64 runs, including 32 made against Northants at Gravesend in an eighth wicket partnership of 81 with Charlie Wright.

Taylor returned to play for the Second XI during 1926, making a further 12 Minor Counties Championship appearances during the period until 1928 at which time his career restricted his opportunities to play county cricket.

== Professional and family life ==
After being demobilised at the end of the war, Taylor studied at Wye College, an agricultural college in Kent, and later joined the civil service. He worked as an agricultural officer in Africa for the Colonial Office during the 1930s, playing some cricket and golf in Kenya and Nigeria before the Second World War, and was "Inspector of Produce" in Nigeria by 1945. He also spent some time in North America through work.

In 1935 Taylor married Doris Austin at Sevenoaks; the couple had two children. He died at Tunbridge Wells in Kent in October 1961 aged 65.

== Bibliography ==
- Carlaw, Derek (2020). Kent County Cricketers, A to Z: Part Two (1919–1939) (PDF). Cardiff: ACS.
- Lewis, Paul (2014). For Kent and Country. Eastbourne: Reveille Press. ISBN 978-19-08336-63-7.
