= Percy Mills (cricketer) =

English cricketer

Percy Thomas Mills (7 May 1879 — 8 December 1950) was an English cricketer who played first-class cricket for Gloucestershire between 1902 and 1929. In his long career, Mills scored over 5,000 runs and took more than 800 wickets.
