= John Hamilton Mortimer =

British painter

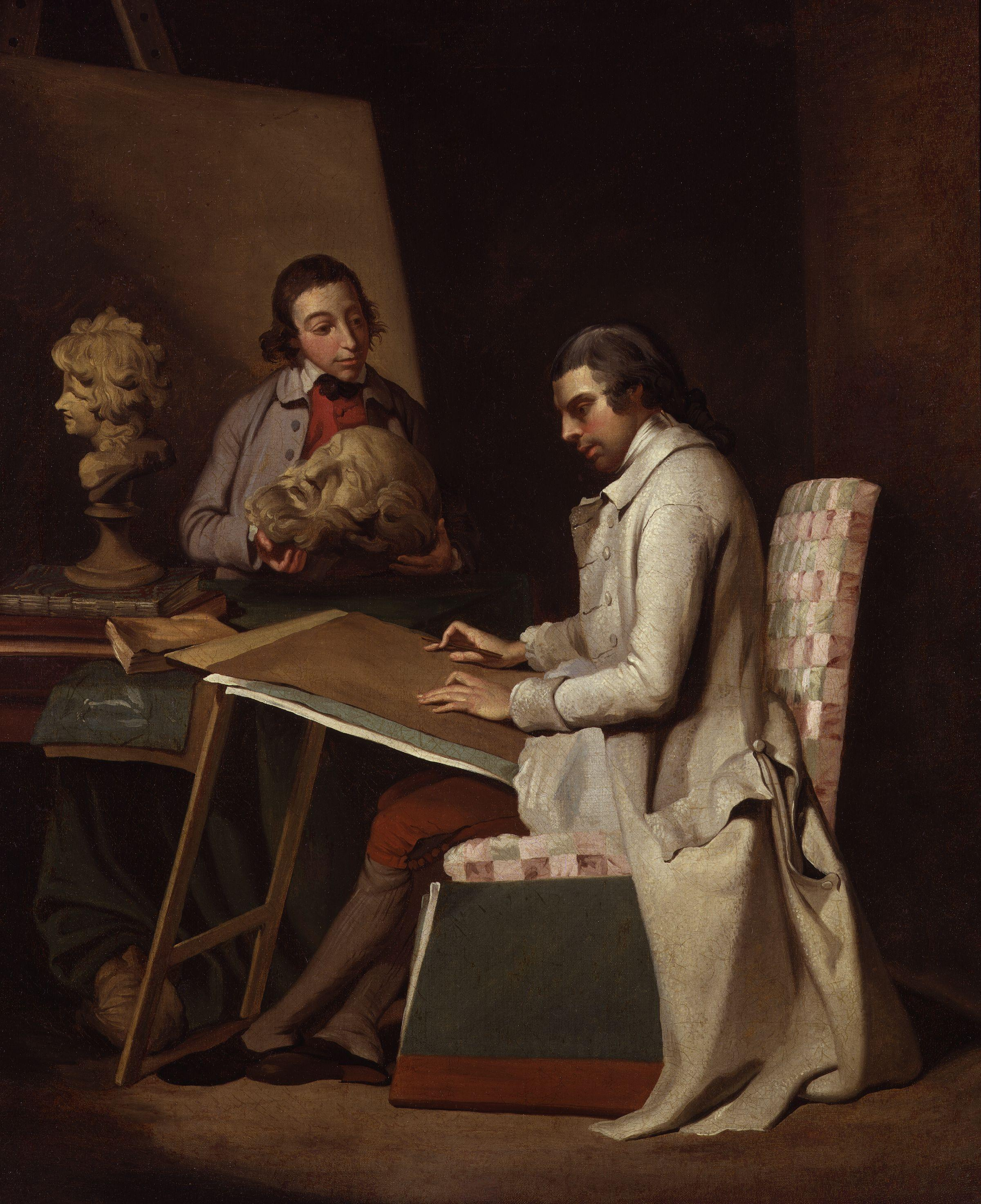
- Self-portrait of John Hamilton Mortimer with a student, c. 1765
- Born: 17 September 1740; Eastbourne, U.K.
- Died: 4 February 1779 (aged 38); London
- Education: Duke of Richmond's Academy
- Occupation: Artist
- Spouse: Jane Hurrel

John Hamilton Mortimer ARA (17 September 1740 – 4 February 1779) was a British figure and landscape painter and printmaker, known for romantic paintings set in Italy, works depicting conversations, and works drawn in the 1770s portraying war scenes, similar to those of Salvator Rosa.^{[I]}

Mortimer became President of the Society of Artists in 1774, five years before his death at age 39.

== Biography ==
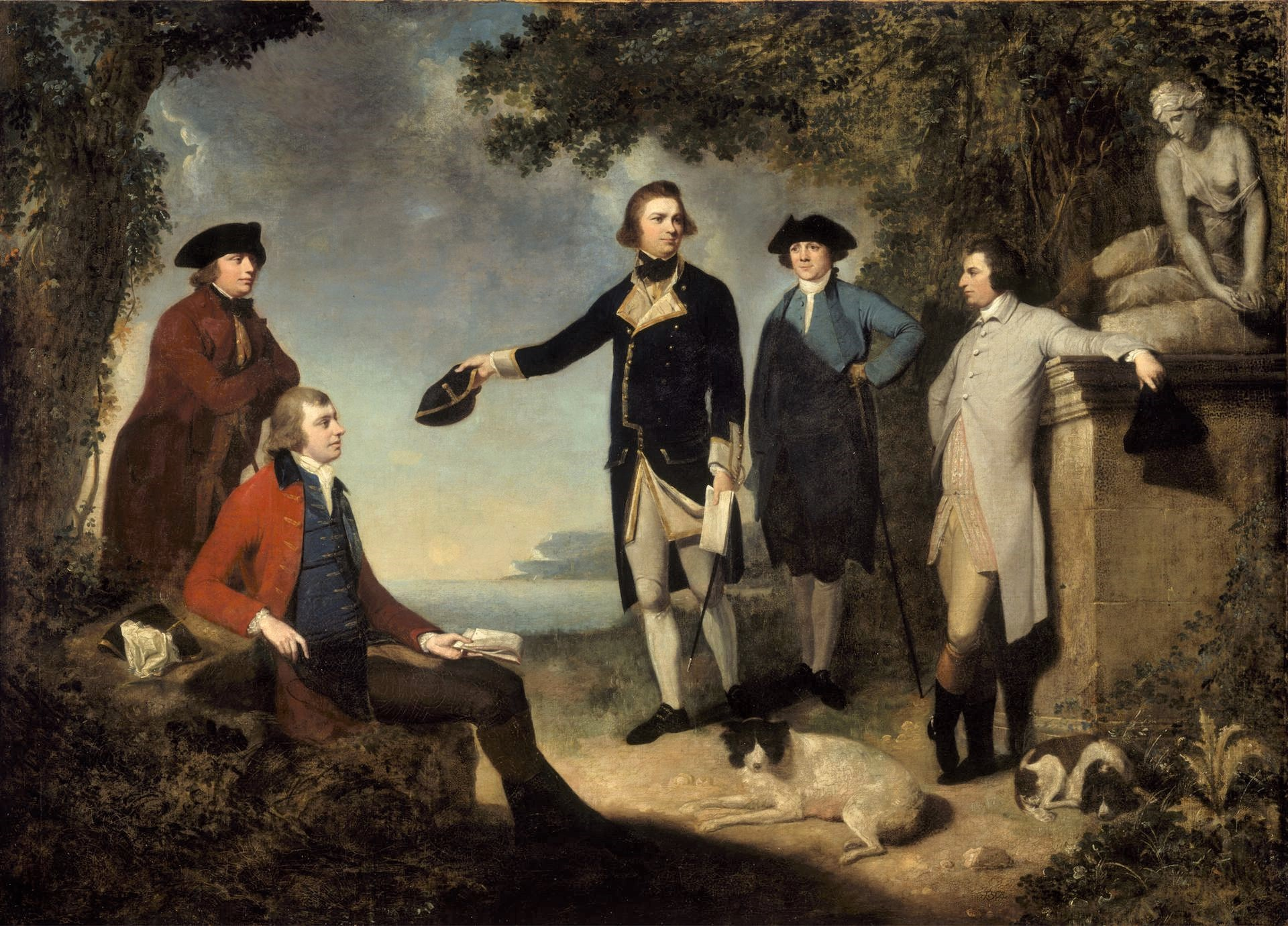
Dr Daniel Solander, Sir Joseph Banks, Captain James Cook, Dr John Hawkesworth and Lord Sandwich by John Hamilton Mortimer, 1771. Use a cursor to see who is who.

Mortimer was born on 17 September 1740 at Eastbourne. His father, Thomas Mortimer, was a customs officer, a dealer in flour and the owner of several mills. By 1757, while he was still young, Mortimer was studying in London at the Duke of Richmond's Academy. During this time he became a friend of Joseph Wright, a fellow student at the Academy – a friendship which would endure throughout Mortimer's life. Mortimer is also known to have had some professional relationship with the artist Samuel Ireland, who was involved with etching his work. At the St Martin's Lane Academy his fellow students included Thomas Jones and William Pars. Mortimer also studied under Giovanni Battista Cipriani, Robert Edge Pine, and Sir Joshua Reynolds.

In 1759, Mortimer won a first prize for a study after Michelangelo's Bacchus and a second prize for a life drawing. He began to exhibit his works regularly in the early 1760s, becoming an active member of the Society of Artists, which awarded him prizes for paintings of subjects from British history in 1763 and 1764. The second of these prizes was for a picture entitled St Paul Preaching to the Ancient Druids in Britain (now in the Guildhall in High Wycombe). He became president of the society in 1774.

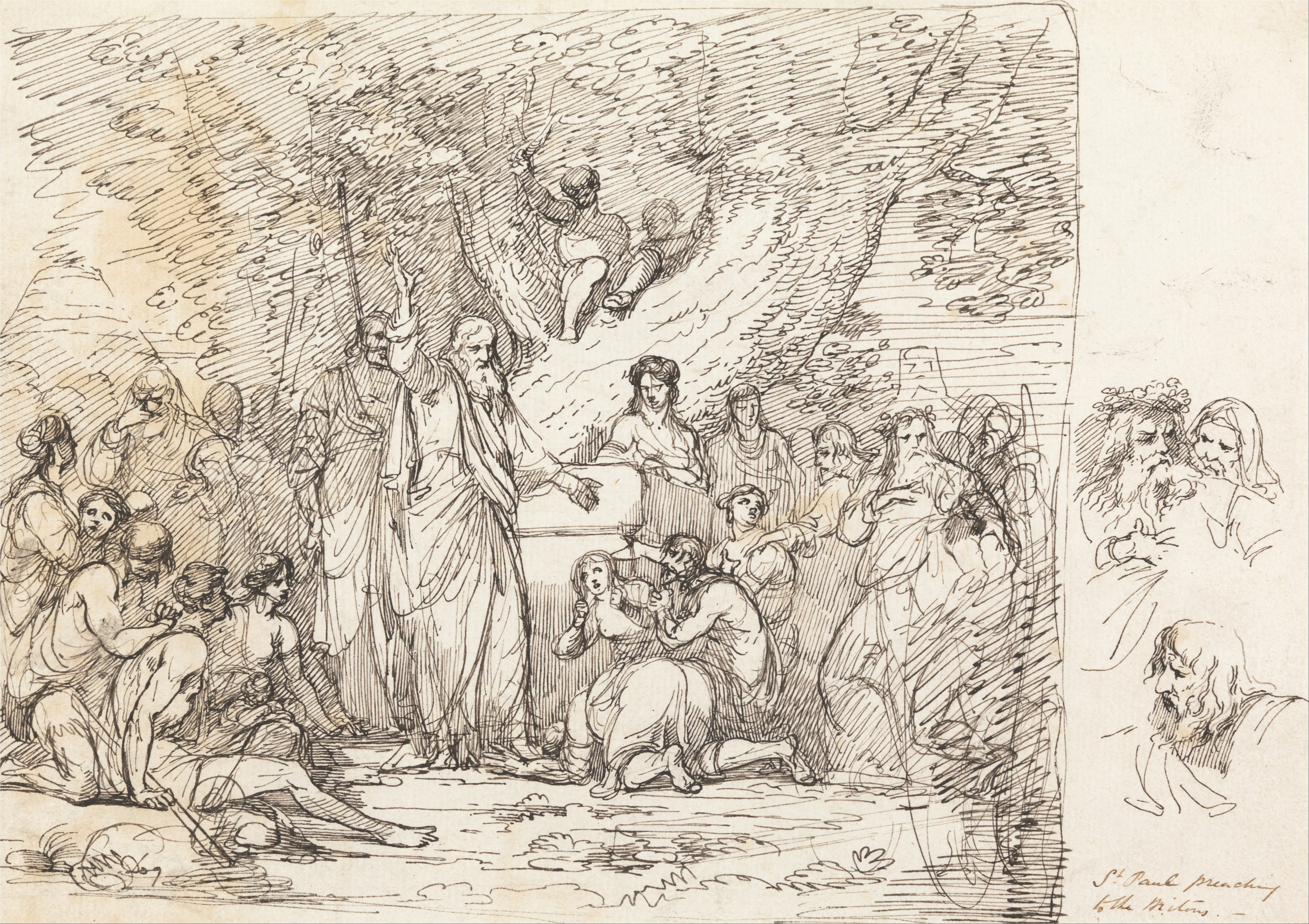
Saint Paul Preaching to the Britons, drawing, (between 1775 and 1778)

Mortimer painted the figures for several paintings by Thomas Jones, working on the Welsh artist's A Land Storm, with the Story of Dido and Aeneas (1769), The Death of Orpheus (c.1770) and a pair of paintings based on Milton's Allegro and Penseroso, commissioned by Benjamin Bates (1774).

In the 1770s Mortimer was associated with a more masculine and criminal presentation of the male form after a period of more effete images. His painting, Sir Arthegal, the Knight of Justice, with Talus, the Iron Man, is used as an example of this style. He was inspired by both the work and the legend of the life of the seventeenth-century Neapolitan painter, Salvator Rosa, who it was claimed, had been brought up by bandits. Mortimer first exhibited a painting of a bandit subject in 1772, and later made an etching after Rosa's self-portrait.

From 1770 to 1773 he was engaged in the decoration of the saloon at Brocket Hall, Hertfordshire, where he was assisted by Thomas Jones, Francis Wheatley, James Durno, and Burnaby Mayor. At this time, he had lodgings in Covent Garden.

In 1775 he married Jane Hurrel, which affected his artistic productivity.

Owing to his membership of the Society of Artists, Mortimer did not exhibit at the Royal Academy until 1778, when he showed five works, including Sir Arthegel and three scenes with Italian bandits. On 2 November of the same year he was elected an Associate of the Royal Academy.

He died of undocumented causes on 4 February 1779.

== Gallery ==
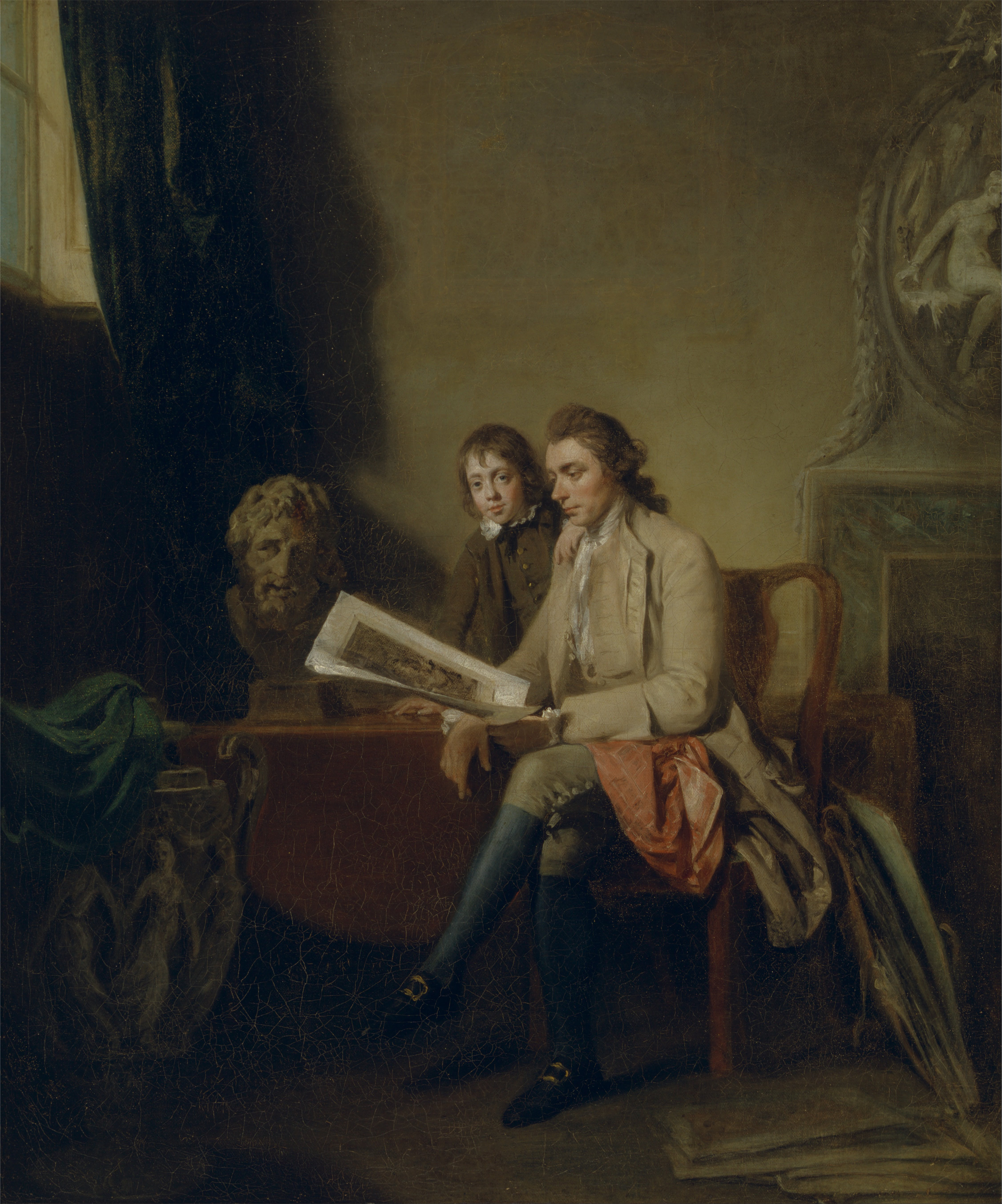
Portrait of a Man and a Boy Looking at Prints, c. 1765–1770

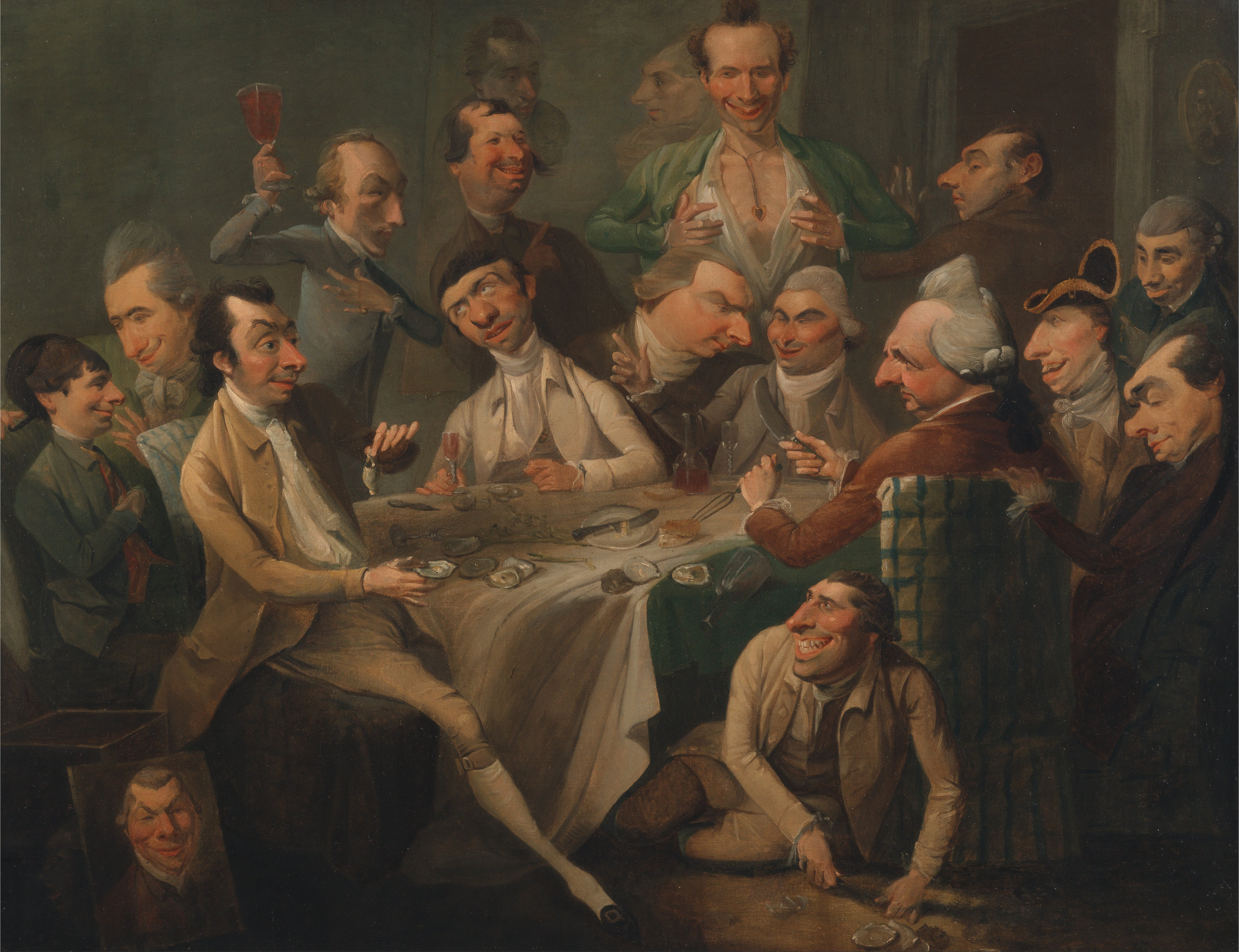
A Caricature Group, c. 1766

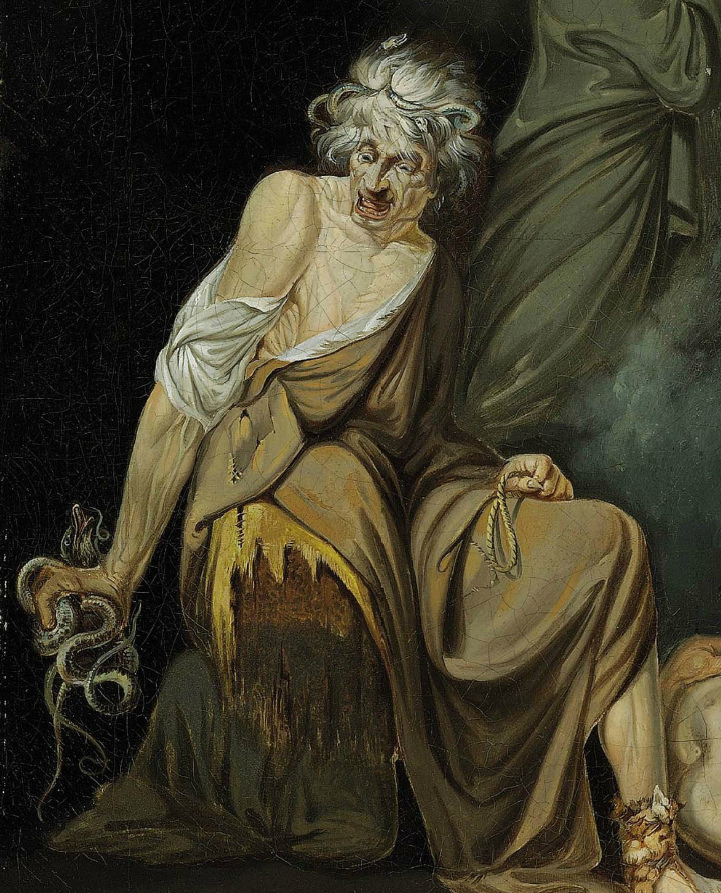
Erichtho

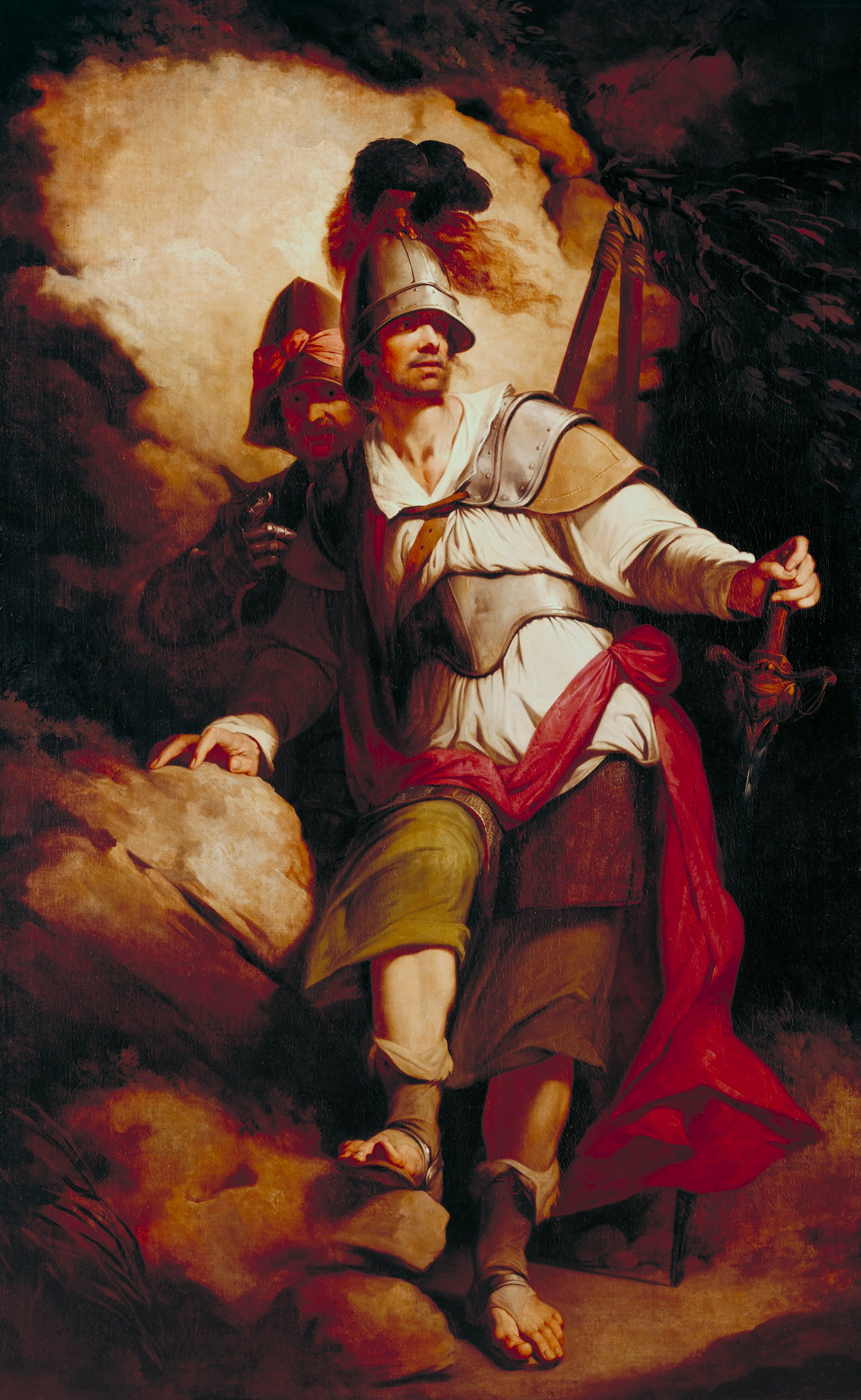
Sir Arthegal, the Knight of Justice, with Talus, the Iron Man, 1778

== Notes ==
I Mortimer was sometimes accused of being a "copier" of others. Horace Walpole, the politician and writer, claimed that Mortimer was nothing more than an "imitator" of Salvator Rosa in his war scene paintings.

== Sources ==
Attribution

This article incorporates text from a publication now in the public domain: Monkhouse, William Cosmo (1894). "Mortimer, John Hamilton". In Lee, Sidney (ed.). Dictionary of National Biography. Vol. 39. London: Smith, Elder & Co.
