= John Bell (publisher) =

18th/19th-century English publisher

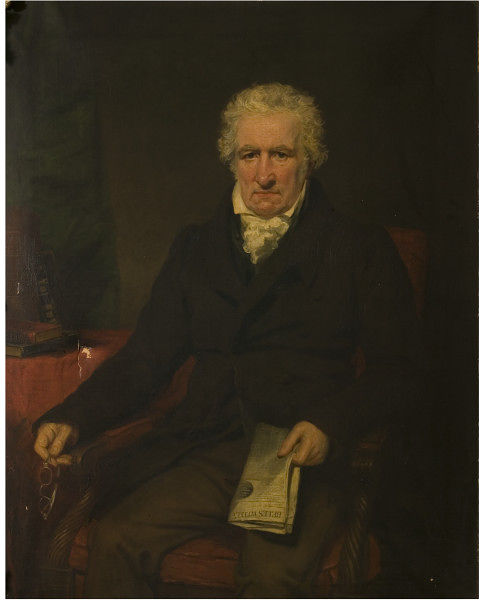
- Born: 1745
- Died: 1831 (aged 85–86); Fulham, England
- Occupation: Publisher
- Writing career
- Language: English

John Bell (1745–1831) was an English publisher. Originally a bookseller and printer, he also innovated in typography, commissioning an influential typeface that omitted the long s. He drew the reading public to better literature by ordering attractive art to accompany printed text.

== Life ==
From 1769, Bell owned a bookshop in the Strand, London, the "British Library". His 109-volume, literature-for-the-masses The Poets of Great Britain Complete from Chaucer to Churchill, which rivalled Samuel Johnson's Lives of the Most Eminent English Poets (1781), was published from 1777 to 1783. Each volume cost just six shillings, much less than what was commonly charged.

Bell's joint-stock organisation of his publishing company defied "the trade" — forty dominant publishing companies — to establish a monopoly on top publications. In addition to the extensive Poets of Great Britain, he published book sets on Shakespeare and The British Theatre. The drawings and illustrations in these works influenced later publishers. He also ran a circulating library. In 1788-1789, he operated a type foundry called the British Letter Foundry in collaboration with punchcutter Richard Austin. Revivals of these typefaces have been made under the name of Bell and Austin.

Bell died in Fulham in 1831, summed up by publisher Charles Knight as a "mischievous spirit, the very Puck of booksellers." He was the uncle of the engraver Edward Bell.

== Periodicals ==
Bell was one of the founders of the Morning Post, a London daily newspaper, in 1772. In 1787 he launched The World, with Edward Topham. Later he set up the Sunday newspaper Bell's Weekly Messenger, the women's monthly magazine La Belle Assemblée, Bell's classical arrangement of fugitive poetry (1789–1810), and other periodicals.

== Works ==
=== British Theatre ===
Bell's British Theatre was published in 1776–1778, and sold in sets 140 plays in 21 volumes, each with a unique choice of plays. For example, one set is arranged thus:

- Volume 2. Including the plays: Spanish Fryar by John Dryden illustrated with Mrs Isabella Mattocks as Elvira. Boadicea by Richard Glover illustrated with Mrs Mary Ann Powell as Boadicea. The Minor by Samuel Foote illustrated with Mr Henry Angelo as Mrs Cole. The Refusal or The Ladies Philosophy by Colley Cibber illustrated with Mr Charles Macklin as Sir Gilbert Wrangle.
- Volume 3. Fair Penitent by Nicholas Rowe illustrated with Mrs Ann Brunton Merry as Calista. Douglas a tragedy by John Home illustrated with Joseph George Holman as Douglas. Cato a tragedy by Joseph Addison illustrated with John Philip Kemble as Cato. Jane Shore a tragedy by Nicholas Rowe illustrated with Mrs Sarah Siddons as Jane Shore. The Roman Father by William Whitehead illustrated with Mrs Ann Brunton Merry as Horatia.
- Volume 4. Every Man in His Humour by Ben Jonson illustrated with Mr Charles Lee Lewes as Captain Bobadil. The Suspicious Husband by Dr. Benjamin Hoadly illustrated with Mr John Bernard as Jack Meggot. The Grecian Daughter by Arthur Murphy illustrated with Mrs Sarah Siddons as Euphrasia. The Choleric Man by Richard Cumberland illustrated with Mr John Fawcet as Jack Nightshade
- Volume 5. Cleone by Robert Dodsley illustrated with Mrs Sarah Siddons as Cleone. Isabella or The Fatal Marriage altered from Thomas Southern illustrated with Mrs Sarah Siddons as Isabella. She Would and She Would Not or The kind Imposter by Colley Cibber illustrated with Mrs (Edward Anthony) Rock as Viletta. The Discovery by Mrs. Frances Sheridan illustrated with Mrs Harriet Pye Esten as Lady Flutter.
- Volume 6. The Distrest Mother translated by Ambrose Philips from the Andromaque by Jean Racine illustrated with Mr William Farren as Oresters. The Earl of Essex by Henry Jones illustrated with Mr William Wroughton as the Earl of Essex. Medea by Richard Glover illustrated with Mrs Sarah Siddons as Medea. The Gamester altered by Charles Johnson from James Shirley and illustrated with Mrs Elizabeth Farren as Penelope. The Battle of Hastings by Richard Cumberland illustrated with Mr Robert Bensley as Harold.
- Volume 7. Love Makes a Man, or the Fop's Fortune by Colley Cibber illustrated with Mr John Quick as Don Lewis. Alzira adapted by Aaron Hill from Voltaire illustrated with Mrs Ann Brunton Merry as Alzira. The School for Wives by Hugh Kelly illustrated with Mrs Maria Hunter as Mrs Belville. The School for Lovers by William Whitehead illustrated with Mrs Elizabeth Heard as Celia.
- Volume 8. The Maid of the Mill by Isaac Bickerstaffe illustrated with Mr William Blanchard as Ralph. Rule a Wife and Have a Wife by Francis Beaumont and John Fletcher illustrated with Mr William Thomas Lewis as the Copper Captain. The Careless Husband by Colley Cibber illustrated with Mr William Farren as Charles Easy. The Revenge by Edward Young LLD illustrated with Mrs Brooks as Leonora.
- Volume 9. The Orphan, or The Unhappy Marriage by Thomas Otway illustrated with Mr Joseph George Holman as Chamont. The Country Lasses by Charles Johnson illustrated with Mrs Margaret Martyr as Aura. She Stoops to Conquer, or the Mistakes of the Night by Dr Oliver Goldsmith illustrated with Mr John Quick as Tony Lumpkins. Edward the Black Prince, or the Battle of Poictiers by William Shirley illustrated with Mr Kemble as the Prince.
- Volume 10. The Beaux Stratagem by George Farquhar illustrated with The Rt. Hons. the Earl of Barrymore as Scrub and Captain George Warthen as Archer. The Gamester by Mr Edward Moore illustrated with Mr Thomas Hull as Javis. The Double Gallant, or The Sick Lady's Cure by Colley Cibber illustrated with Mrs Charles Lee Lewis as Mrs Sadlife. Theodosius, or the Force of Love by Nathaniel Lee illustrated with Alexander Pope as Varanes.
- Volume 11. The Beggar's Opera by John Gay illustrated with Mrs Anna Maria Crouch as Polly. The Chances by Francis Beaumont and John Fletcher adapted by The Duke of Buckingham illustrated with Mr John Palmer as Don John. The Miser by Henry Fielding Esq. illustrated with Mr Richard Yates as Lovegold. The Foundling by Mr Edward Moore illustrated with Mrs Rosoman Mountain as Fedelia.
- Volume 12. A Bold Stroke for a Wife by Mrs. Susanna Centlivre illustrated with Mrs Mary Stephens Wells as Mrs Lovely. All in the Wrong by Arthur Murphy illustrated with Mrs Isabella Mattocks as Lady Restless. The Brothers by Richard Cumberland illustrated with Mrs Webb as Lady Dove. The Siege of Damascus by John Hughes illustrated with Mr John Pritt Harley as Called.
- Volume 13. Love in a Village by Isaac Bickerstaff illustrated with Mrs Elizabeth Billington as Rosetta. The Country Girl by David Garrick adapted from William Wycherley illustrated with Mrs Dorothy Jordan as Peggy. The Conscious Lovers by Sir Richard Steele illustrated with Mr Robert Palmer as Tom. The Recruiting Officer by George Farquhar illustrated with Mrs Margaret Martyr as Rose.
- Volume 14. The Fair Quaker, or Deal or Humours of the Navy by Charles Shadwell illustrated with Mr John Moody as Commodore Flip. Tancred and Sigismunda by James Thomson illustrated with Mr Joseph George Holman as Tancred. George Barnwell by George Lillo illustrated with Mr John Palmer as George Barnwell. The Clandestine Marriage by George Coleman and David Garrick illustrated with Mr Thomas King as Lord Ogleby.
- Volume 15. Venice Preserved, or A Plot Discovered by Thomas Otway illustrated with Mrs Harriet Pye Esten as Belvirdira. Lady Jane Gray by Nicholas Rowe illustrated with Mrs Elizabeth Inchbald as Lady Jane Gray. Oedipus by John Dryden and Nathaniel Lee illustrated with John Philip Kemble as Oedipus. Ximena, or The Heroic Daughter Colley Cibber illustrated with Mr John Palmer as Don Carlos.
- Volume 16. The Busy Body by Mrs. Susanna Centlivre illustrated with Mr Joseph Shepherd Munden as Sir Francis Gripe. All for Love, or The World Well Lost by John Dryden illustrated with Mrs Ward as Octavia. The Constant Couple, or The Trip to The Jubilee by George Farquhar illustrated with Mrs Charlotte Goodall as Sir Harry Wildair. The Carmelite by Richard Cumberland illustrated with Mrs Sarah Siddons as Matilda.
- Volume 17. Zara by Aaron Hill illustrated with Mr John Pritt Harley as Lusiganan. The Way to Keep Him Arthur Murphy illustrated with Mrs Frances Abington as the Widow Bellmour. The Good Natured Man by Dr Oliver Goldsmith illustrated with Miss Barclay as Olivia. The Earl of Warwick translated by Dr. Franklin of The Grecian by M. de la Harpe illustrated with Mrs Elizabeth Whitelock as Margaret.
- Volume 18. Philaster by Francis Beaumont and John Fletcher illustrated with Mr William Wyatt Dimond as Philaster. The Profok'd Husband, or A Journey to London by Sir John Vanbrugh and Colley Cibber illustrated with Mr Richard Wilson as Sir Francis Wronghead. The Fashionable Lover by Richard Cumberland illustrated with Miss Chapman as Augusta Aubrey. The Countess of Salisbury by Hall Hartson illustrated with Mr James Middleton as Salisbury.
- Volume 19. The Mourning Bride by Mr. William Congreve illustrated with Mr Alexander Pope as Zara. Oroonoko by Thomas Southern illustrated with Mrs S. Kemble as Imoinda. The West Indian by Richard Cumberland illustrated with Mr John Henry Johnstone as Major O'Flaharty. King Charles I by Mr William Havard illustrated with Mr John Kemble as King Charlesv.
- Volume 20. The Tender Husband, or the Accomplished Fools by Sir Richard Steele illustrated with Robert Baddeley as Sir Harry Gubbin. The Committee by the Hon. Sir Robert Howard illustrated with Edward Anthony Rock as Teague. The Natural Son by Richard Cumberland illustrated with Mr William Parsons as Dumps. The Jealous Wife by George Coleman illustrated with Mr Robert Bensley as Oakly.
- Volume 21. The School for Fathers or Lionel & Clarissa by Isaac Bickerstaff illustrated with William Parsons as Colonel Oldboy. The Hypocrite by Isaac Bickerstaff illustrated with Mr John Fawcet as Maw-Worm. The Wonder A Woman Keeps a Secret by Mrs. Susanna Centlivre illustrated with Mr William Wyatt Dimond as Don Felix. Amphitryon, or The Two Socias adapted by Dr. John Hawkesworth from John Dryden illustrated with Mrs Dorothy Jordan as Phoedra.
