= The Country Attorney =

1787 play

- Written by: Richard Cumberland
- Genre: Comedy

Premiere
- Date: 7 July 1787
- Place: Theatre Royal, Haymarket, London

The Country Attorney is a 1787 comedy play by the British writer Richard Cumberland. It was first performed at the Haymarket Theatre on 7 July 1787. The Haymarket cast included Robert Bensley as Sterling, James Aickin as Wordly, Stephen Kemble as Sir Wilful Wayward, Robert Palmer as Lord Millamourm, John Bannister as Jack Volatile and Mary Bulkley as Mrs Worldly, Margaret Cuyler as Mrs Gayless and Elizabeth Farren as Lady Rustic. It was not published during Cumberland's lifetime. The play was reworked and much of it used again by Cumberland for the 1789 play The School for Widows.

== Bibliography ==
- Nicoll, Allardyce. A History of English Drama 1660-1900. Volume III: Late Eighteenth Century Drama. Cambridge University Press, 1952.
- Watson, George. The New Cambridge Bibliography of English Literature: Volume 2, 1660-1800. Cambridge University Press, 1971.
