= William Parsons (actor) =

British actor and painter

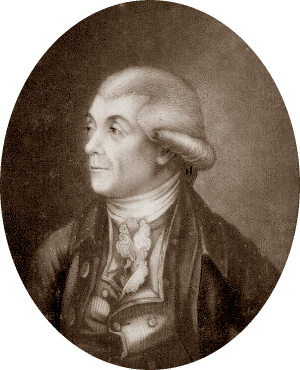
Parsons in 1779

William Parsons (29 February 1736 – 3 February 1795) was a British actor and painter in the mid to late eighteenth century. He appeared mostly at Drury Lane and Haymarket in minor to supporting roles, but also had prominent roles in plays like Volpone and Hamlet.

== Early life ==
Parsons was born to William and Elizabeth (née Latter) Parsons in 1736. His father William did carpentry work in Bow Lane, Cheapside and City of London; his mother Elizabeth was from Maidstone.

Parsons attended St Paul's School where surveyor Sir Henry Cheere or Cheke was his instructor. Parsons took part in amateur entertainment with William Powell and Charles Holland. In 1756, Parsons played Kent in King Lear in Haymarket.

== Professional career ==
=== Earlier roles ===
Parsons's first professional role was that of Southampton in poet Henry Jones's Earl of Essex play in York. Most of his work during this time was high comedy and tragedy. Under the guidance of West Digges, Parsons acted at the Theatre Royale Edinburgh in 1757–8. More roles soon followed for Parsons such as the role of Don Felix in Wonder, Charino in Love Makes a Man, and Grigg in Beggar's Wedding.

=== 1760s and more prominent roles ===
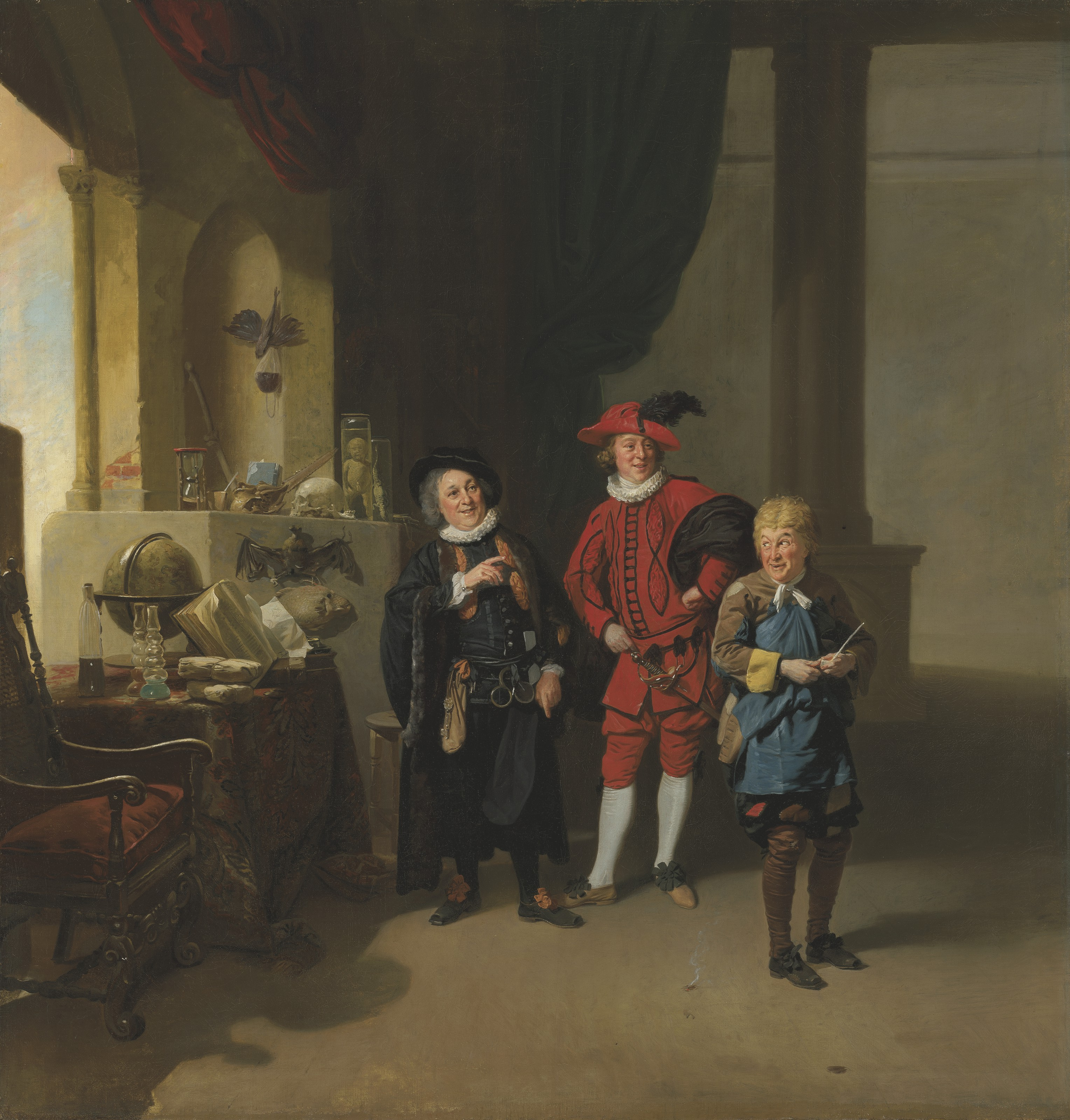
Edmund Burton as Subtle (left), Parsons as Face (centre) and David Garrick as Abel Drugger in The Alchemist

In 1763, Parsons began working with David Garrick, when Parsons played Filch in The Beggar's Opera at Drury Lane. Parsons would appear in over 200 roles at Drury Lane over the years, mostly in supporting or non important roles.

Parsons took on the role of the original Nicodemus in Elizabeth Griffith's play Platonick Wife in January 1765 before appearing for the first time at the Haymarket in the role of Dr. Catgut in Foote's The Commissary later that same year. Parsons would appear regularly at the Haymarket during the summers, introducing characters in new comedies. During that season, Parsons appeared in Henry IV, Part 1 as Douglas, in Hamlet as Rosencrantz, in Love Makes a Man and as Robert in All in the Wrong.

Parsons took on more character driven roles in this time period, with character driven roles such as the snitch-servant Blunt in The London Merchant and as Lord Plausible in Plain Dealer to appearing as Gobbo in The Merchant of Venice and Sir William Meadows in Love in a Village.

In 1767, Parsons played his most substantial role, Polonius, in Hamlet

=== 1770s ===
Parsons as Periwinkle in A Bold Stroke for a Wife, 1777

Parsons took on his first Christmas role, appearing as the original Faladel in the Christmas Tale in 1773. This kept the trend going of Parsons playing original roles. Parsons took on one of his more prominent military roles in the 1770s, playing a decadent General Worry in Rival Candidates. He would continue the trend of playing military-court roles in this time period when he appeared in The Runaway as the original Justice and as old Colonel Lovemore in the Contract which brought Parsons back to the Haymarket in June 1776.

During the 1776–77 season, Parsons kept churning out original roles at Drury Lane, appearing as Sir Jacob Thrift in Hotel or Double Valet, Doctor Probe in Trip to Scarborough, and as the gossip Crabtree in The School for Scandal. Parsons took a step back in this period, playing smaller parts. Parsons also returned to the Haymarket with the trend of original roles at the theatre, playing Tony Lumpkin in Tony Lumpkin in Town.

As the 1770s gave way to the 1780s, Parsons was appearing in plays such as The Lord of the Manor.

=== Later career ===
Parsons played legal roles later in his career such as playing an attorney in Divorce, and a Justice in both Love in a Village and in A New Way to pay Old Debts. Around this time, Parsons played Bale in Fair American.

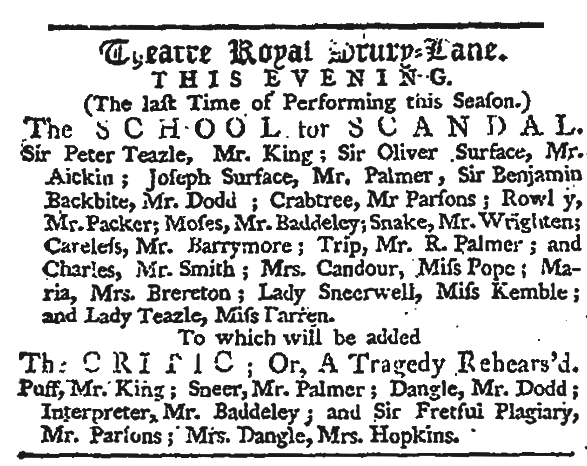
Sheridan double bill at Drury Lane, 1785: Parsons as Crabtree in The School for Scandal and Sir Fretful Plagiary in The Critic

Parsons moved on and appeared in The Good-Natur'd Man as Twitch. Other plays that Parsons appeared in during this time included The Clandestine Marriage, Measure for Measure and Variety. Of his performance as Lord Ogleby in The Clandestine Marriage in 1784, the reviewer in a London newspaper wrote, "This very favourite actor, whose merit is so extensive, and whose reception by the town is equal to his merit, can hardly assume any shape in which he will not display talents of pure comedy".

Unlike the previous decades, Parsons scarcely played original characters in his later career. Parsons appeared in these original roles at the Haymarket which included him playing mogul-Pope Johnny Atkins in Mogul Tale or the Descent of the Balloon, the begging Squire Codger in Beggar on Horseback, Mr Euston in I'll tell you What, the servant Rohf in Disbanded Officer, Governor of Jamaica Sir Christopher Curry in Inkle and Yarico and lowly regarded but fashionable Alscrip in The Heiress. Most of these roles featured Parsons playing lowly characters.

During the last years of his life, Parsons refused to quit acting, appearing in Poor Old Drury as Cobb and in Fugitives as Old Manly, the latter in August 1792. His last roles at the Haymarket Theatre occurred in June 1792 where he played Toby Thatch in The London Hermit and as Lope Tocho in Mountaineers (which also was Parson's last original part).

After Parsons appeared in the Confederacy as Moneytrap, he played his last role: Sir Fretful Plagiary in The Critic.

== Style ==
While Parsons's rivals possessed singing talent that eluded him, Parsons relied on his mental talents as seen in his role in Peeping Tom and his exclaiming abilities as seen in Volpone (one of his most notable roles), The Confederacy and The Village Lawyer to get ahead.

Parsons's niche was playing elderly men like Whittle in Irish Widow, and Colonel Oldboy in Lionel and Clarissa or playing country clowns like Scrub in The Stratagem.

In 1812, the author of Biographia Dramatica, called Parsons "a comic actor of superlative merit", and added, "In the conception and execution of such characters as Foresight, in Love for Love; Corbaccio in Volpone; Sir Fretful Plagiary in The Critic, &c. we never expect to see his equal".

== Painting career ==
Besides being an actor, Parsons was also a painter and a painting judge. Parsons contributed some of his pictures to the Society of Artists and the Free Society of Artists. Some of Parsons's subjects were architectural displays and landscapes such as views of Richmond. Parsons's paintings included the Spaniards Inn St Paul's, Hampstead, St George Fields's Frog Hall amongst other subjects.

Parsons's painting style was inspired by Richard Wilson. Parsons was acquainted with several prominent painters of the late eighteenth century.

Parsons bought many paintings of first masters at brokers shops which he would later sell for large sums of money.

== Personal life and death ==
On 21 September 1762, Parsons married Mary Price, who was in the play The Beggar's Opera with him. After Parsons's first wife died in 1787, he remarried Dorothy or Dorthea. Parsons had one child, a son named Stewart.

On 3 February 1795, Parsons died, partially due to his asthma at his home in Mead's Row Lambeth. His tomb in Lee, Kent currently has a rhymed epitaph over it.

Parsons left his leasehold estate Stangate and his small Bearsted freehold to his son Stewart. Parsons left 591 per annum and leasehold houses in London Road and his leasehold estate in Mead's to his wife.

== Selected roles ==
- Varland in The West Indian by Richard Cumberland (1771)
- Sir Thomas Richacre in The Maid of Kent by Francis Godolphin Waldron (1773)
- Tony Lumpkin in Tony Lumpkin in Town by John O'Keeffe (1778)
- Doiley in Who's the Dupe? by Hannah Cowley (1779)
- Welford in The Double Deception by Elizabeth Richardson (1779)
- Alderman Ingot in The School for Vanity by Samuel Jackson Pratt (1783)
- Dumps in The Natural Son by Richard Cumberland (1784)
- Mr Euston in I'll Tell You What by Elizabeth Inchbald (1785)
- Don Antonio in The Widow's Vow by Elizabeth Inchbald (1786)
- Alscrip in The Heiress by John Burgoyne (1786)
- Rohf in The Disbanded Officer by James Johnstone (1786)
- Don Gasper in A School for Greybeards by Hannah Cowley (1786)
- Snarl in The Village Lawyer by George Colman the Elder (1787)
- Governor in False Appearances by Henry Seymour Conway (1789)
- Toby Thatch in The London Hermit by John O'Keeffe (1793)
