= Richard Cumberland =

Richard Cumberland may refer to:

- Richard Cumberland (philosopher) (1631–1718), bishop, philosopher
- Richard Cumberland (dramatist) (1732–1811), civil servant, dramatist
- Richard Cumberland (priest) (1710–1737), Archdeacon of Northampton, 1707–1737
- Portrait of Richard Cumberland, a 1776 painting by George Romney
