= I'll Tell You What (play) =

1785 play

- Written by: Elizabeth Inchbald
- Original language: English
- Genre: Comedy
- Setting: England, present day

Premiere
- Date premiered: 4 August 1785
- Place premiered: Theatre Royal, Haymarket, London

I'll Tell You What is a 1785 comedy play by the English writer Elizabeth Inchbald. It premiered at the Theatre Royal, Haymarket in London on 4 August 1785. The original cast included John Palmer as Major Cyprus, Robert Bensley as Anthony Euston, James Aickin as Colonel Downright, James Brown Williamson as Sir George Euston, John Bannister as Charles Euston, Robert Palmer as Sir Harry Harmless, William Parsons as Mr Euston, Mary Bulkley as Lady Euston and Elizabeth Farren as A Young Lady. The Irish premiere took place at the Smock Alley Theatre in Dublin on 12 December 1785.

== Bibliography ==
- Greene, John C. Theatre in Dublin, 1745-1820: A Calendar of Performances, Volume 6. Lexington Books, 2011.
- Nicoll, Allardyce. A History of English Drama 1660–1900: Volume III. Cambridge University Press, 2009.
- Hogan, C.B (ed.) The London Stage, 1660–1800: Volume V. Southern Illinois University Press, 1968.
- Robertson, Ben P. Elizabeth Inchbald's Reputation: A Publishing and Reception History. Routledge, 2015.
