= The Disbanded Officer =

1786 play

- Original language: English
- Written by: James Johnstone
- Genre: Comedy
- Setting: Berlin, Kingdom of Prussia

Premiere
- Date: 24 July 1786
- Place: Theatre Royal, Haymarket, London

The Disbanded Officer; Or, The Baroness of Bruschal is a 1786 comedy play by James Johnstone, inspired by the 1763 German play Minna von Barnhelm by Gotthold Ephraim Lessing. It premiered at the Theatre Royal, Haymarket in London on 24 July 1786. The original London cast included John Palmer as Colonel Holberg, John Bannister as Paul Warmans, Robert Baddeley as Katzenbuckel, William Parsons as Rohf, Charles Farley as Boy, Elizabeth Farren as Baroness of Bruschal, Mary Bulkley as Lisetta and Elizabeth Inchbald as Lady in Mourning. The Irish premiere took place at the Smock Alley Theatre in Dublin on 15 February 1787. Johnstone dedicated the publisher version to Queen Charlotte.

== Bibliography ==
- Greene, John C. Theatre in Dublin, 1745-1820: A Calendar of Performances, Volume 6. Lexington Books, 2011.
- Nicoll, Allardyce. A History of English Drama 1660–1900: Volume III. Cambridge University Press, 2009.
- Hogan, C.B (ed.) The London Stage, 1660–1800: Volume V. Southern Illinois University Press, 1968.
