= The School for Vanity =

1783 play

- Original language: English
- Written by: Samuel Jackson Pratt
- Genre: Comedy

Premiere
- Date: 29 January 1783
- Place: Theatre Royal, Drury Lane, London

The School for Vanity is a 1783 comedy play by the British writer Samuel Jackson Pratt. It premiered at the Theatre Royal, Drury Lane in London on 29 January 1783. The original Drury Lane cast included Thomas King as Sir Hercules Caustic, John Palmer as Sighwell, James William Dodd as Lord Frolic, William Brereton as Valentine Onslow, Robert Baddeley as Secondhand, William Parsons as Alderman Ingot, Elizabeth Hopkins as Lady Blaze, Mary Bulkley as Widow Wherett and Elizabeth Farren as Ophelia Wyndham.

== Bibliography ==
- Nicoll, Allardyce. A History of English Drama 1660-1900: Volume III. Cambridge University Press, 2009.
- Hogan, C.B (ed.) The London Stage, 1660-1800: Volume V. Southern Illinois University Press, 1968.
