= The Jew of Mogadore =

1808 comic opera

- Original language: English
- Written by: Richard Cumberland
- Genre: Comedy

Premiere
- Date: 3 May 1808
- Place: Theatre Royal, Drury Lane, London

The Jew of Mogadore is an 1808 comic opera written by the British dramatist Richard Cumberland. It premiered at the Theatre Royal, Drury Lane in London on 3 May 1808. The original cast included Charles Holland as Selim, Prince of Morocco, Michael Kelly as Sidi Hassan, William Dowton as Nadab, John Henry Johnstone as Rooney, Rosemond Mountain as Zelma, Maria Bland as Brigida and Nancy Storace as Mammora.

Cumberland had previously written a successful, sympathetic play The Jew about a Jewish moneylender. However The Jew of Mogadore met with critical hostility when it opened at Drury Lane. The title character is a merchant operating out of Mogadore on the Moroccan coast.

== Bibliography ==
- Schroeter, Daniel J. The Sultan's Jew: Morocco and the Sephardi World. Stanford University Press, 2002.
