= The Princess of Parma =

The Princess of Parma is a 1778 play by the British playwright Richard Cumberland. It was originally staged at Kelmarsh Hall in Northamptonshire. No copy of the work is known to survive.

== Bibliography ==
- Nicoll, Allardyce. A History of English Drama 1660-1900. Volume III: Late Eighteenth Century Drama. Cambridge University Press, 1952.
