= The Banishment of Cicero =

- Original language: English
- Written by: Richard Cumberland
- Genre: tragedy

Premiere
- Date: 1761
- Place: England

The Banishment of Cicero is a 1761 tragedy play by the British writer Richard Cumberland. It follows the downfall and death of the Roman orator Marcus Tullius Cicero. David Garrick declined to stage the play, so Cumberland instead had it published. After this Cumberland switched to writing generally much lighter works, mostly comedy.

== Bibliography ==
- Title: THE BANISHMENT OF CICERO. A Tragedy
- Publisher: Printed for J. Walter, London
- Publication Date: 1761
- Binding: Disbound
- Edition: First Edition
- Nicoll, Allardyce. A History of English Drama 1660-1900. Volume III: Late Eighteenth Century Drama. Cambridge University Press, 1952.
