= The Dependent =

1795 play

- Original language: English
- Written by: Richard Cumberland
- Genre: Comedy

Premiere
- Date: 20 October 1795
- Place: Theatre Royal, Drury Lane, London

The Dependent is a 1795 comedy play by the British writer Richard Cumberland. It premiered at the Theatre Royal, Drury Lane in London on 20 October 1795. The original cast included Thomas King as Lord Leverington, Richard Suett as Sir Clement Canteser, John Philip Kemble as Edmund D'Alincourt, James Aickin as Carrington, John Bannister as Gabriel Wrinkle, George Wathen as Isaac, John Phillimore as Thomas, Walter Maddocks as Harry, Jane Pope as Mrs Margaret and Elizabeth Farren as Jane.

== Bibliography ==
- Greene, John C. Theatre in Dublin, 1745-1820: A Calendar of Performances, Volume 6. Lexington Books, 2011.
- Nicoll, Allardyce. A History of English Drama 1660–1900: Volume III. Cambridge University Press, 2009.
- Hogan, C.B (ed.) The London Stage, 1660–1800: Volume V. Southern Illinois University Press, 1968.
