= The Maid of Kent =

1773 play

- Original language: English
- Written by: Francis Godolphin Waldron
- Genre: Comedy

Premiere
- Date: 17 May 1773
- Place: Theatre Royal, Drury Lane, London

The Maid of Kent is a 1773 comedy play by the English writer Francis Godolphin Waldron. It premiered at the Theatre Royal, Drury Lane on 17 May 1773. The original cast included William Parsons as Sir Thomas Richacre, John Hayman Packer as Doctor Goodman, Francis Godolphin Waldron as Metre, John Palmer as George, Joseph Vernon as William, John Moody as O'Connor, Robert Baddeley as La Poudre, Richard Griffith as Robert, Elizabeth Younge as Emily, Jane Pope as Patty and Mary Bradshaw as Dame Quickset.

== Bibliography ==
- Greene, John C. Theatre in Dublin, 1745-1820: A Calendar of Performances, Volume 6. Lexington Books, 2011.
- Nicoll, Allardyce. A History of English Drama 1660–1900: Volume III. Cambridge University Press, 2009.
- Hogan, C.B (ed.) The London Stage, 1660–1800: Volume V. Southern Illinois University Press, 1968.
