= Next Door Neighbours =

1791 play

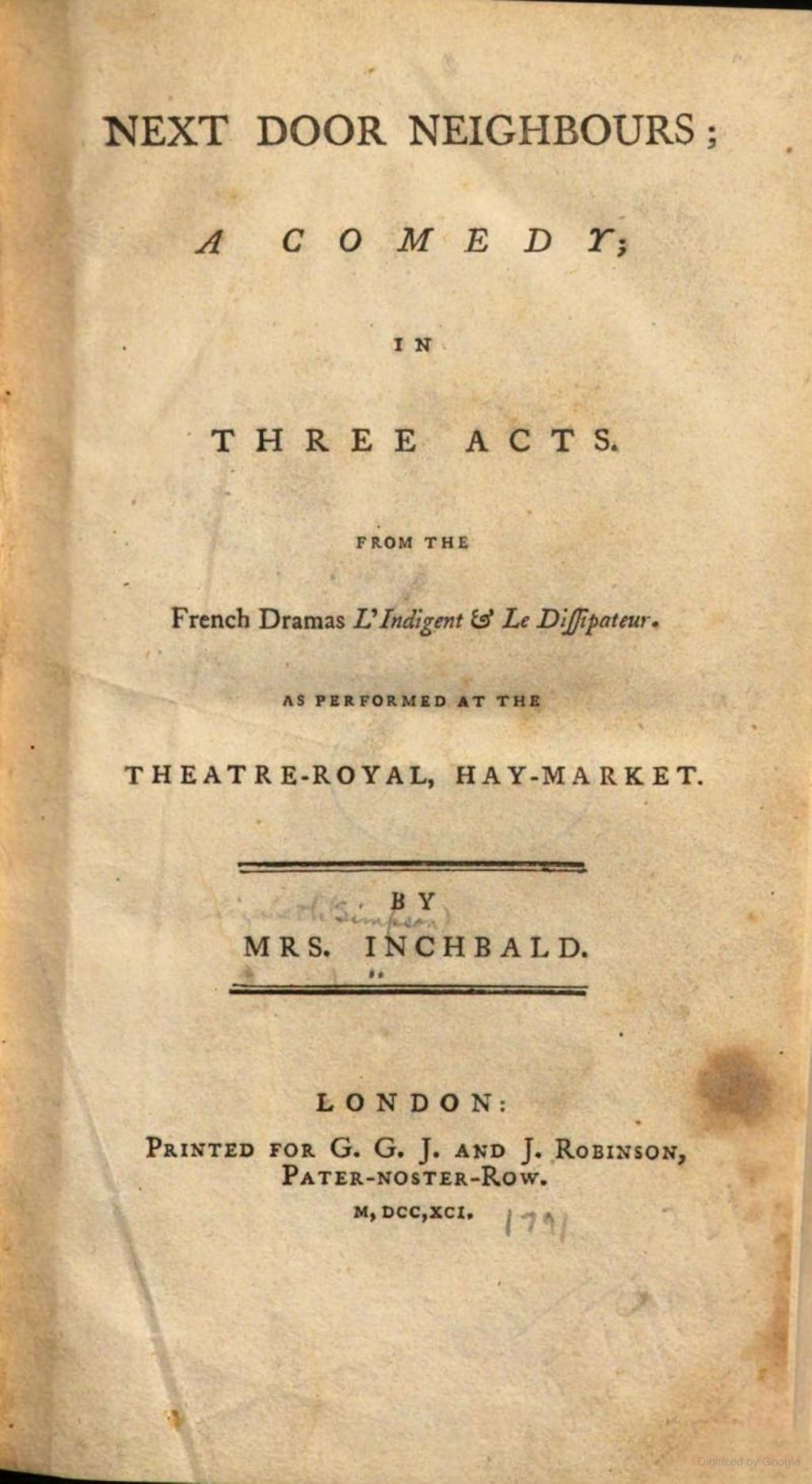
- Written by: Elizabeth Inchbald
- Original language: English
- Genre: Comedy
- Setting: London, present day

Premiere
- Date premiered: 9 July 1791
- Place premiered: Theatre Royal, Haymarket, London

Next Door Neighbours is a 1791 comedy play by the British writer Elizabeth Inchbald. It premiered at the Theatre Royal, Haymarket on 9 July 1791. The Irish premiere took place at the Crow Street Theatre in Dublin on 29 April 1795. The original Haymarket cast included John Palmer as Sir George Splendorville, Stephen Kemble as Mr Manly, Robert Baddeley as Mr. Blackman, Robert Palmer as Mr. Lucre, Robert Evatt as Lord Hazard, James Aickin as Willford, John Bannister as Bluntly, Elizabeth Heard as Lady Bridget Squander and Elizabeth Kemble as Eleanor.

== Bibliography ==
- Greene, John C. Theatre in Dublin, 1745-1820: A Calendar of Performances, Volume 6. Lexington Books, 2011.
- Nicoll, Allardyce. A History of English Drama 1660–1900: Volume III. Cambridge University Press, 2009.
- Hogan, C.B (ed.) The London Stage, 1660–1800: Volume V. Southern Illinois University Press, 1968.
- Robertson, Ben P. Elizabeth Inchbald's Reputation: A Publishing and Reception History. Routledge, 2015.
