= Robert Baddeley (actor) =

English actor

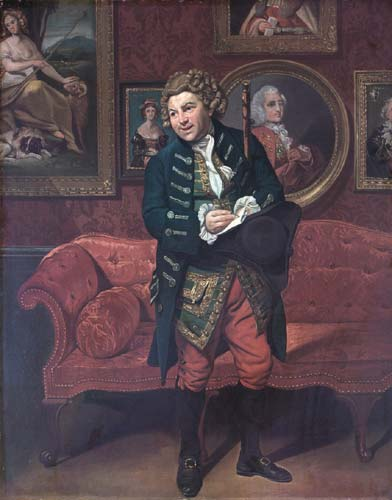
Robert Baddeley as Moses in Sheridan's The School for Scandal by Johann Zoffany c.1781

Robert Baddeley (1733–1794) was an English actor. His parentage is unknown, as is his place of birth, though the latter may have been London. He worked as a cook and valet, and one of his employers was the actor-manager Samuel Foote, who may have inspired him to take to the stage. He spent three years following another employer on a Grand Tour, which helped him to develop the facility with languages and accents which was to be a hallmark of his career.

In 1760 Baddeley made his stage debut in one of Foote's productions at the Haymarket Theatre in London. Soon afterwards he trod the boards of the Theatre Royal, Drury Lane and the Smock Alley Theatre in Dublin. By 1762 he was a full member of the Drury Lane company, and he remained there for the rest of his career, while also playing summer seasons at the Haymarket. He was a great success in low comedy and servants' parts, and often played comic foreigners such as Canton in The Clandestine Marriage. In 1777 he played Moses in The School for Scandal, which came to be the role with which he was most associated.

Baddeley's wife, Sophia Baddeley, exceeded him in fame. The couple had a troubled relationship. At one point Baddeley insisted that Sophia stop living with one Doctor Hayes, and in the financial negotiations that followed Baddeley ended up fighting a duel with David Garrick's brother and business manager George, who had disputed his version of events. No one was injured and a separation was agreed.

Baddeley continued acting until just before his death. A sufferer of epilepsy, he was taken ill on 19 November 1794 while preparing to play Moses in The School for Scandal and he died the following day. He bequeathed £3 per annum to provide wine and cake in the green room of Drury Lane Theatre on Twelfth Night. The ceremony of the "Baddeley Cake" has remained a regular institution.

The 20th-century actress sisters Angela Baddeley and Hermione Baddeley are no relations.

== Selected roles ==
- Canton in The Clandestine Marriage by George Colman the Elder (1766)
- Robert in The School for Rakes by Elizabeth Griffith (1769)
- Stockwell in The West Indian by Richard Cumberland (1771)
- Doctor Druid in The Fashionable Lover by Richard Cumberland (1772)
- La Poudre in The Maid of Kent by Francis Godolphin Waldron (1773)
- Dibble in The Choleric Man by Richard Cumberland (1774)
- Rudely in The Double Deception by Elizabeth Richardson (1779)
- Secondhand in The School for Vanity by Samuel Jackson Pratt (1783)
- Katzenbuckel in The Disbanded Officer by James Johnstone (1786)
- Chignon in The Heiress by John Burgoyne (1786)
- The Resident in The Sword of Peace by Mariana Starke (1788)
- Old Spriggins in The Family Party by George Colman the Younger (1790)
- Sir Solomon Sapient in The Impostors by Richard Cumberland (1789)
- Corporal in The Battle of Hexham by George Colman the Younger (1790)
- Mr. Blackman in Next Door Neighbours by Elizabeth Inchbald (1791)
- Old Crotchet in The Box-Lobby Challenge by Richard Cumberland (1794)
