= James Aickin =

Irish stage actor

James Aickin (died 1803), (Note: Also spelt James Aikin) was an Irish stage actor who worked at the Edinburgh Theatre in Scotland and in theatres in the West End of London.

He was the younger brother of the actor Francis Aickin (died 1803) with whom he shared the stage at the Edinburgh Theatre before he gave offence to his public by his protest against the discharge of a fellow-actor. He therefore went to London, and from 1767 to 1800 was a member of the Drury Lane Company and for some years a deputy manager. He quarrelled with John Philip Kemble, with whom, in 1792, he fought a bloodless duel.

== Biography ==
James Aickin was the younger brother of actor Francis Aickin, and like him brought up to be a weaver. After joining a company strolling through Ireland, and gaining some experience of the stage, he embarked for Scotland, and presently accepted an engagement to appear at the Edinburgh Theatre. He was very favourably received, and gradually, from his merit as an actor and his sensible deportment in private life, became the head of the Canongate Company, playing most of the leading parts in tragedy and comedy.

In January 1767 a riot took place in the Edinburgh Theatre because of the discharge by the management of one Stanley, an actor of small merit, in whom, however, a section of the public took extraordinary interest. The inside of the building was demolished, the furniture ransacked, and the fixtures destroyed. It was not until troops from Edinburgh Castle had come to the relief of the city guard that the rioters were dispersed, and the theatre saved from further injury.

James Aickin, who had particularly offended the rioters, left Edinburgh, and, accepting an engagement at Drury Lane, made his first appearance there in December 1767 as Colonel Camply in Kenrick's comedy The Widowed Wife. He continued a member of the 'Drury Lane company, with occasional appearances at the Haymarket Theatre during the summer months, until his retirement in 1800. He was for some years one of the deputy managers of Drury Lane, and was reputed to be a useful and pleasing actor, easy, graceful, and natural of manner. "His forte lay in the representation of an honest steward or an affectionate parent". Boaden states that while the tones of his voice were among "the sweetest that ever met the ear", he was not happy in his temper.

In 1792 he took offence at some of John Kemble's managerial arrangements, was personally rude to him, and challenged him to a duel. The actors met in "some field in Marylebone", a third actor, Charles Bannister, undertaking the duties of second to both combatants. Aickin discharged his pistol, but fortunately missed his manager, who declined to fire in return; a reconciliation was then accomplished. Kemble afterwards explained that "he saw from his adversary's levelling at him that he was in no danger".

== Selected roles ==
- Lord Courtly in The Widowed Wife by William Kenrick (1767)
- Euran in The Fatal Discovery by John Home (1769)
- Stukely in The West Indian by Richard Cumberland (1771)
- Major Rackett in The Maid of Bath by Samuel Foote (1771)
- Phocion in The Grecian Daughter by Arthur Murphy (1772)
- Costolo in Alonzo by John Home (1773)
- Amasis in Sethona by Alexander Dow (1774)
- Manlove in The Choleric Man by Richard Cumberland (1774)
- Almada in Braganza by Robert Jephson (1775)
- Morley in The Runaway by Hannah Cowley (1776)
- Earl of Northumberland in The Battle of Hastings by Richard Cumberland (1778)
- Zirvad in Zoraida by William Hodson (1779)
- Fairgrove in The Double Deception by Elizabeth Richardson (1779)
- Sandford in Who's the Dupe? by Hannah Cowley (1779)
- Egbert in Albina, Countess Raimond by Hannah Cowley (1779)
- Lord De Courci in The Carmelite by Richard Cumberland (1784)
- Iolaus in The Royal Suppliants by John Delap (1781)
- Colonel Downright in I'll Tell You What by Elizabeth Inchbald (1785)
- Mr Rightly in The Heiress by John Burgoyne (1786)
- General Burland in Seduction by Thomas Holcroft (1787)
- Barnard in Vimonda by Andrew Macdonald (1787)
- Manoa in Julia by Robert Jephson (1787)
- Solerno in The Regent by Bertie Greatheed (1788)
- Old Random in Ways and Means by George Colman the Younger (1788)
- Sir William Cecil in Mary, Queen of Scots by John St John (1789)
- Mr Classick in The Married Man by Elizabeth Inchbald (1789)
- Captain George Sapient in The Impostors by Richard Cumberland (1789)
- John de Veinne in The Surrender of Calais by George Colman the Younger (1791)
- Willford in Next Door Neighbours by Elizabeth Inchbald (1791)
- Old Pranks in The London Hermit by John O'Keeffe (1793)
- Sir Toby Grampus in The Box-Lobby Challenge by Richard Cumberland (1794)
- Sir Stephen Bertram in The Jew by Richard Cumberland (1794)
- Steward in The Welch Heiress by Edward Jerningham (1795)
- Carrington in The Dependent by Richard Cumberland (1794)
- Casimir, King of Poland in Zorinski by Thomas Morton (1795)
- Hudson in The Man of Ten Thousand by Thomas Holcroft (1796)
- Ramirez in Almeyda, Queen of Granada by Sophia Lee (1796)
- Count Valdesoto in Don Pedro by Richard Cumberland (1796)
- Kenrick in The Castle Spectre by Matthew Lewis (1797)
- Stadfast in The Heir at Law by George Colman the Younger (1797)
- Lord Glenadry in A Word for Nature by Richard Cumberland (1798)
- The Patriarch in The Inquisitor by Thomas Holcroft (1798)
- Las Casas in Pizarro by Richard Brinsley Sheridan (1799)
- Count of Colman in The Castle of Montval by Thomas Sedgwick Whalley (1799)
- Walsingham in The East Indian by Mathew Lewis (1799)
- King Henry in Adelaide by Henry James Pye (1800)
