= False Appearances =

1789 play

- Written by: Henry Seymour Conway
- Original language: English
- Genre: Comedy
- Setting: France

Premiere
- Date premiered: 20 April 1789
- Place premiered: Theatre Royal, Drury Lane, London

False Appearances is a 1789 comedy play by the British politician and general Henry Seymour Conway, inspired by the 1740 French play Trompeurs Dehors by Louis de Boissy. It appeared at the Theatre Royal, Drury Lane in London on 20 April 1789. The Irish premiere took place at the Crow Street Theatre in Dublin on 13 July 1789 The original Drury Lane cast included John Philip Kemble as Marquis, Richard Wroughton as Baron, William Parsons as Governor, John Bannister as Abbé, Robert Palmer as Robert, Elizabeth Farren as Countess, Anna Maria Crouch as Lucile, Priscilla Kemble as Caelia and Jane Pope as Lisette. The epilogue was written by John Burgoyne.

== Bibliography ==
- Greene, John C. Theatre in Dublin, 1745-1820: A Calendar of Performances, Volume 6. Lexington Books, 2011.
- Nicoll, Allardyce. A History of English Drama 1660–1900: Volume III. Cambridge University Press, 2009.
- Hogan, C.B (ed.) The London Stage, 1660–1800: Volume V. Southern Illinois University Press, 1968.
