= The Impostors (play) =

1789 play

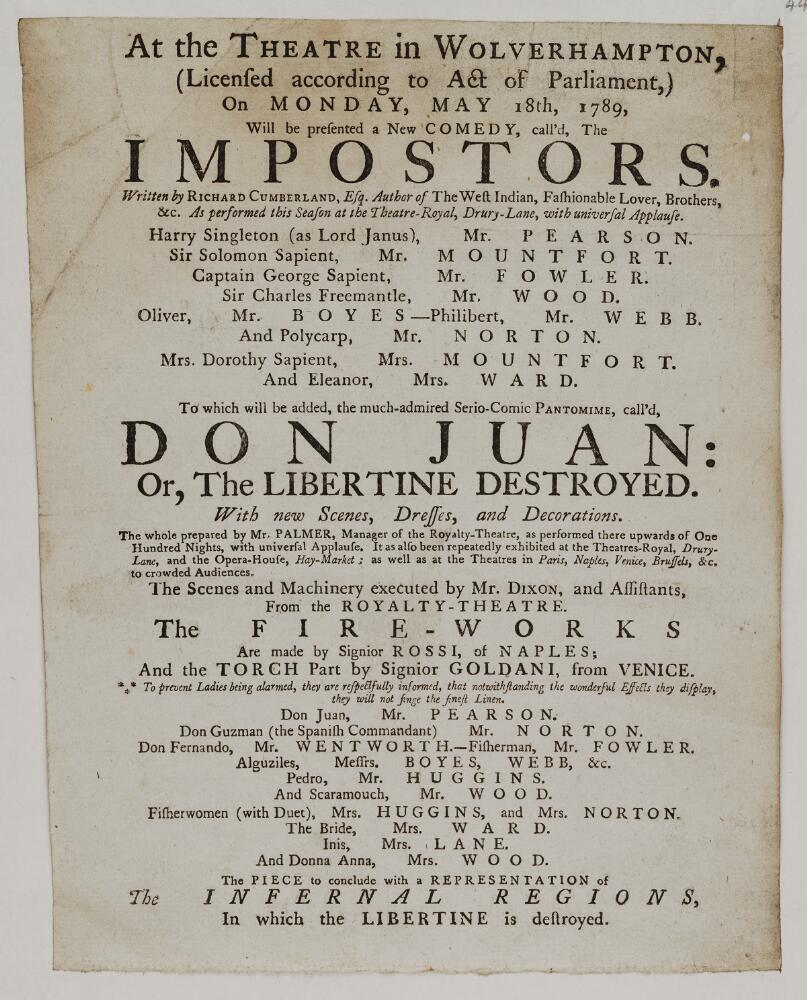
- Original language: English
- Written by: Richard Cumberland
- Genre: Comedy

Premiere
- Date: 26 January 1789
- Place: Theatre Royal, Drury Lane, London

The Impostors is a comedy play by Richard Cumberland. It was first performed at the Drury Lane Theatre in January 1789. The plot closely resembled that of The Beaux' Stratagem by George Farquhar.

The original Drury Lane Cast included John Palmer as Lord Janus, Robert Baddeley as Sir Solomon Sapient, James Aickin as Captain George Sapient, William Barrymore as Sir Charles Freemantle, Richard Suett as Oliver and Richard Wroughton as Polycarp, Jane Pope as Mrs Dorothy and Dorothea Jordan as Eleanor.

== Bibliography ==
- Hogan, C.B (ed.) The London Stage, 1660–1800: Volume V. Southern Illinois University Press, 1968.
- Mudford, William. The Life of Richard Cumberland. Sherwood, Neely & Jones, 1812.
- Nicoll, Allardyce. A History of English Drama 1660-1900. Volume III: Late Eighteenth Century Drama. Cambridge University Press, 1952.
