= The Royal Suppliants =

1781 play

- Original language: English
- Written by: John Delap
- Genre: Tragedy

Premiere
- Date: 17 February 1781
- Place: Theatre Royal, Drury Lane

The Royal Suppliants is a 1781 tragedy by John Delap.

The original Drury Lane cast included William 'Gentleman' Smith as Acamas, John Bannister as Hyllus, James Aickin as Iolaus, William Farren as Alcander, John Hayman Packer as Thestor, Robert Palmer as Officer, Robert Bensley as Demophon, Ann Crawford as Dienira and Elizabeth Farren as Macaria. It was dedicated to Henry Temple, 2nd Viscount Palmerston.

== Bibliography ==
- Nicoll, Allardyce. A History of English Drama 1660-1900: Volume III. Cambridge University Press, 2009.
- Hogan, C.B (ed.) The London Stage, 1660-1800: Volume V. Southern Illinois University Press, 1968.
