= The London Hermit =

1793 play

- Original language: English
- Written by: John O'Keeffe
- Genre: Comedy
- Setting: Dorset, present day

Premiere
- Date: 29 June 1793
- Place: Theatre Royal, Haymarket, London

The London Hermit, Or, Rambles in Dorsetshire is a 1793 comedy play by the Irish writer John O'Keeffe. It was staged at the Theatre Royal, Haymarket on 29 June 1793. The original cast included Richard Suett as Whimmy, James Aickin as Old Pranks, John Bannister as Young Pranks, Howard Usher as Barleycorn, Ralph Wewitzer as Barebones, John Henry Johnstone as Tully, William Parsons as Toby Thatch, Lydia Webb as Mrs. Maggs, Elizabeth Kemble as Kitty Barleycorn, Elizabeth Heard as Dian and Jane Powell as Fishwoman. The prologue was written by George Colman the Younger and spoken by William Barrymore. It was staged at the Crow Street Theatre in Dublin in 1795.

== Bibliography ==
- Greene, John C. Theatre in Dublin, 1745-1820: A Calendar of Performances, Volume 6. Lexington Books, 2011.
- Nicoll, Allardyce. A History of English Drama 1660–1900: Volume III. Cambridge University Press, 2009.
- Hogan, C.B (ed.) The London Stage, 1660–1800: Volume V. Southern Illinois University Press, 1968.
