= The School for Widows =

1789 play

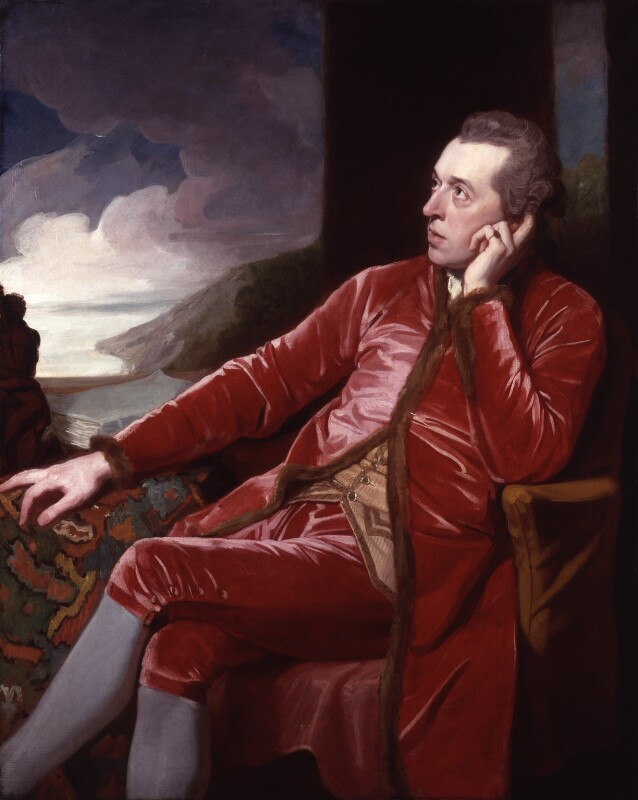
- Original language: English
- Written by: Richard Cumberland
- Genre: Comedy

Premiere
- Date: 8 May 1789
- Place: Covent Garden Theatre, London

The School for Widows is a 1789 comedy play by the British writer Richard Cumberland. It premiered at the Theatre Royal, Covent Garden on 8 May 1789. The original Covent Garden cast included William Thomas Lewis as Jack Marmoset, Thomas Ryder as Mr Wordly, John Quick as Sir Wilful Wayward, Alexander Pope as Frederick, Isabella Mattocks as Mrs Wordly, Sarah Wewitzer as Mrs Gayless and Frances Abington as Lady Charlotte Richmore. It was never published.

== Bibliography ==
- Nicoll, Allardyce. A History of English Drama 1660–1900: Volume III. Cambridge University Press, 2009.
- Hogan, C.B (ed.) The London Stage, 1660–1800: Volume V. Southern Illinois University Press, 1968.
