= Elizabeth Farren =

Irish actress (c. 1759–1829)

The Right Honourable The Countess of Derby
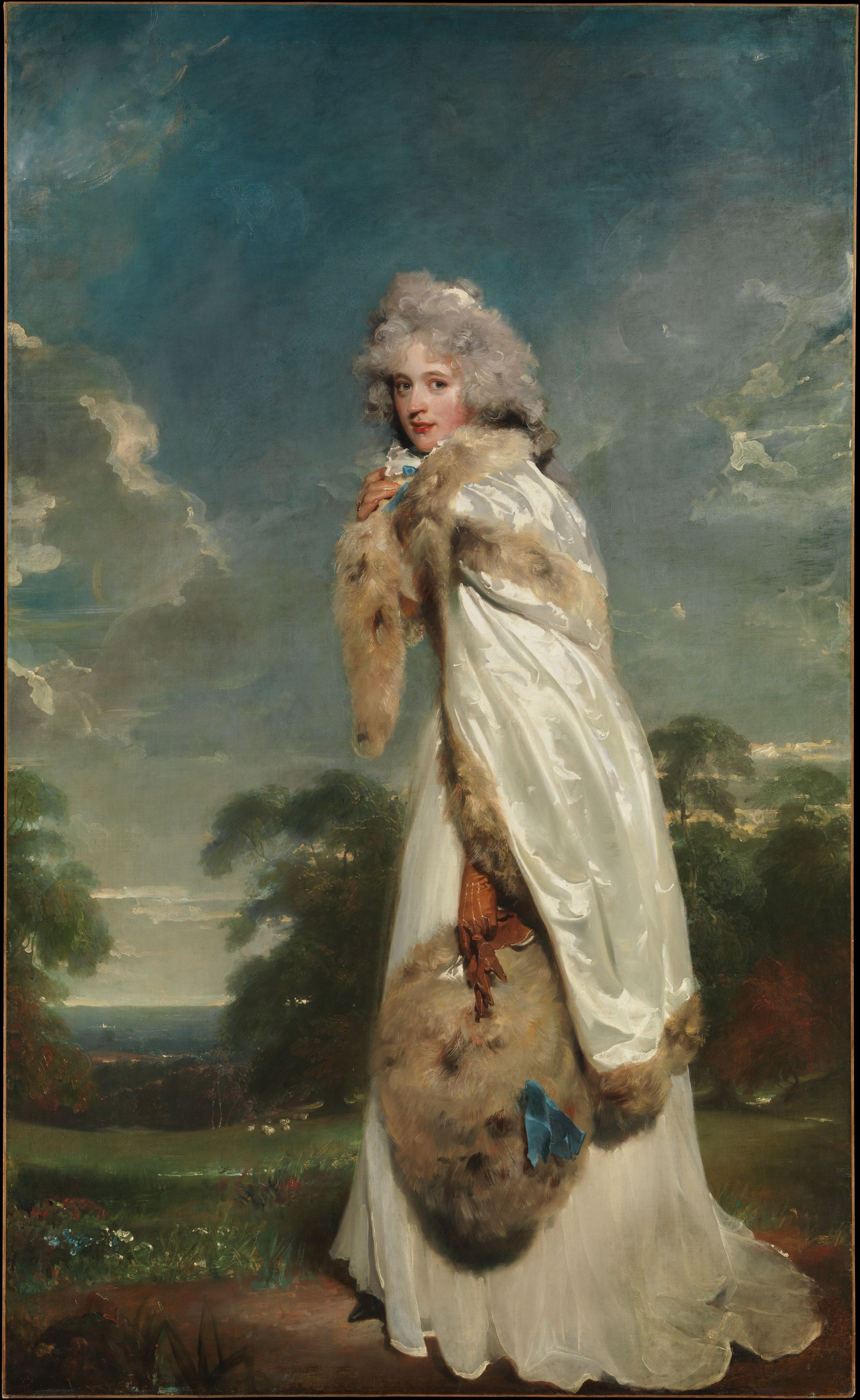
- Portrait of Elizabeth Farren, c. 1790, by Sir Thomas Lawrence
- Born: 1759
- Died: 1829 (aged 69–70); Knowsley Park, Lancashire, England
- Other name: Elizabeth Farren
- Occupation: Actress
- Years active: c.1774–1797
- Spouse: Edward Smith-Stanley, 12th Earl of Derby (1752–1834)

Elizabeth Stanley, Countess of Derby (c. 1759 – 23 April 1829), known as Elizabeth Farren, was an Irish actress of the late 18th century. She was born in Cork in 1759 to George Farren, a surgeon. His drinking habits brought on early death and his widow returned to Liverpool. Her mother went on the stage to support herself and her children. Elizabeth first appeared on the London stage in 1777 as Miss Hardcastle in She Stoops to Conquer and the following year appeared at Drury Lane which, along with the Haymarket Theatre became her primary venues for the rest of her acting career. She had over 100 characters in her repertoire including Shakespeare and various contemporary comedies and dramas. She was often compared to Frances Abington, who was her only real rival.

Her last appearance was in April 1797, two months before her marriage to Edward Smith-Stanley, 12th Earl of Derby. They had three children; one daughter survived.

== Early life ==
Elizabeth (sometimes Eliza) Farren was the daughter of George Farren of Cork, Ireland, a surgeon and apothecary, later an actor, and his wife (née Wright) of Liverpool, the daughter of a publican or brewer. The actress Margaret Farren was her sister. At a very early age, Farren performed at Bath and elsewhere in juvenile parts. In 1774, she was acting with her mother and sisters at Wakefield under Tate Wilkinson's opponent, Whiteley, when she played Columbine and sang. At the age of fifteen, at Liverpool, she played Rosetta in Love in a Village and subsequently her best known role of Lady Townly in The Provoked Husband by Colley Cibber.

== London career ==
She was introduced by Younger, her Liverpool manager, to George Colman and made her first appearance in London at the Haymarket on 9 June 1777, playing Miss Hardcastle. Her performance was favourably received, and, after playing Maria in Murphy's Citizen, Rosetta, and Miss Tittup in Garrick's Bon Ton, she was cast as Rosina in the Spanish Barber, or the Useless Precaution, his adaptation from Beaumarchais' The Barber of Seville. She also spoke the epilogue to the play. On 11 July 1778, she was the original Nancy Lovel in Colman's Suicide. This was a "breeches" part, to which her figure was unsuited, and she was subjected to some satire for shapelessness. Performances as Lady Townly, and Lady Fanciful in the Provoked Wife restored her to public favour.

In September 1778, she made her first appearance at Drury Lane, as Charlotte Rusport in the West Indian. She performed primarily at this theatre (where she was the successor to Frances Abington when the latter left in 1782) or at the Haymarket for the rest of her stage career, with occasional performances in the provinces and at Covent Garden. She had over 100 characters in her repertoire, including Berinthia in Sheridan's Trip to Scarborough, Belinda in Murphy's All in the Wrong, Angelica in Love for Love, Elvira in Spanish Friar, Hermione in the Winter's Tale, Olivia in Twelfth Night, Portia, Lydia Languish, Millamant in The Way of the World, Statira, Juliet, and Lady Betty Modish. She "created" few original parts: Lady Sash in The Camp, assigned to Sheridan, Drury Lane, 15 October 1778; Mrs Sullen in Colman's Separate Maintenance, Drury Lane, 31 August 1779; Cecilia in Miss Lee's Chapter of Accidents, Haymarket, 5 August 1780; Almeida in Pratt's The Fair Circassian, 27 November 1781; and the heroines of various comedies and dramas of Mrs. Cowley, Mrs. Inchbald, General Burgoyne, Miles Peter Andrews, and of other writers. The last original part she played was the heroine of Holcroft's Force of Ridicule, 6 December 1796, which was unfavourably received on its first night and remains unprinted. On her last appearance, 8 April 1797, she played Lady Teazle; a large audience was attracted, and Farren, after speaking the farewell lines of her part, burst into tears.

The Shakespearean parts of Hermione, Portia, Olivia and Juliet were in her repertory, but comedy parts such as Lady Betty Modish, Lady Townly, Lady Fanciful and Lady Teazle were her favourites. Farren had a slight figure and was above average height. Her face was expressive and animated, she had blue eyes, a winning smile, and a sweet, cultivated voice. In manner and bearing she appears to have had no rival except Frances Abington, with whom she was often compared.

Hazlitt speaks of "Miss Farren, with her fine-lady airs and graces, with that elegant turn of her head and motion of her fan and tripping of her tongue" (Criticisms and Dramatic Essays, 1851, p. 49). Richard Cumberland (Memoirs, ii. 236) mentions her style as "exquisite." George Colman the younger (Random Recollections, 1. 251) says of "the lovely and accomplished Miss Farren" that "No person ever more successfully performed the elegant levies of Lady Townly." Tate Wilkinson credits her with "infinite merit" (Wandering Patentee, iii. 42). Boaden (Life of Siddons, ii. 318) says that after her retirement comedy degenerated into farce. Horace Walpole spoke of her as the most perfect actress he had ever seen, and Mrs. Siddons, on the day of Farren's marriage, commiserated the loss of "our comic muse."

== Retirement and later life ==
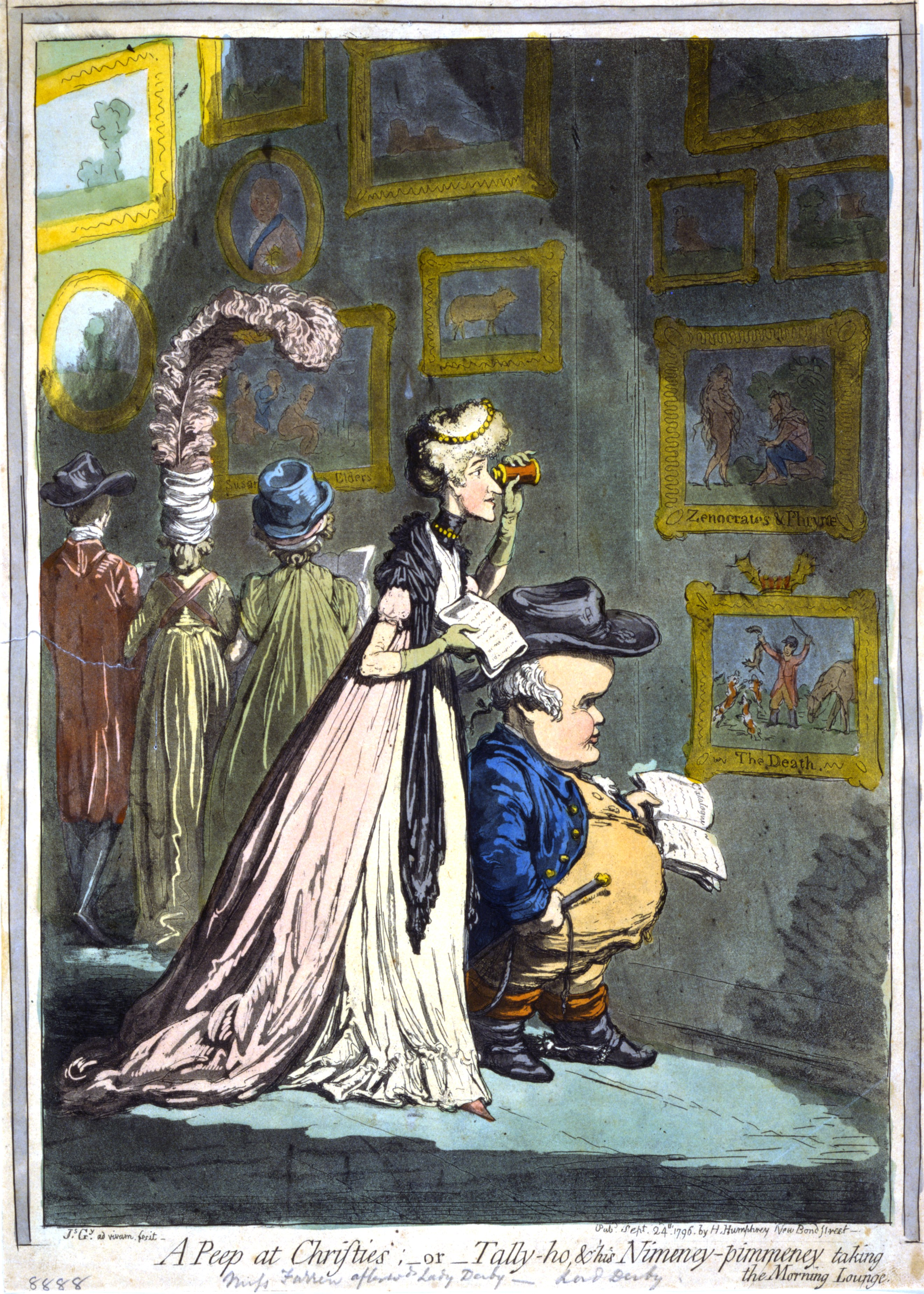
1796 caricature by James Gillray, depicted next to her future husband.

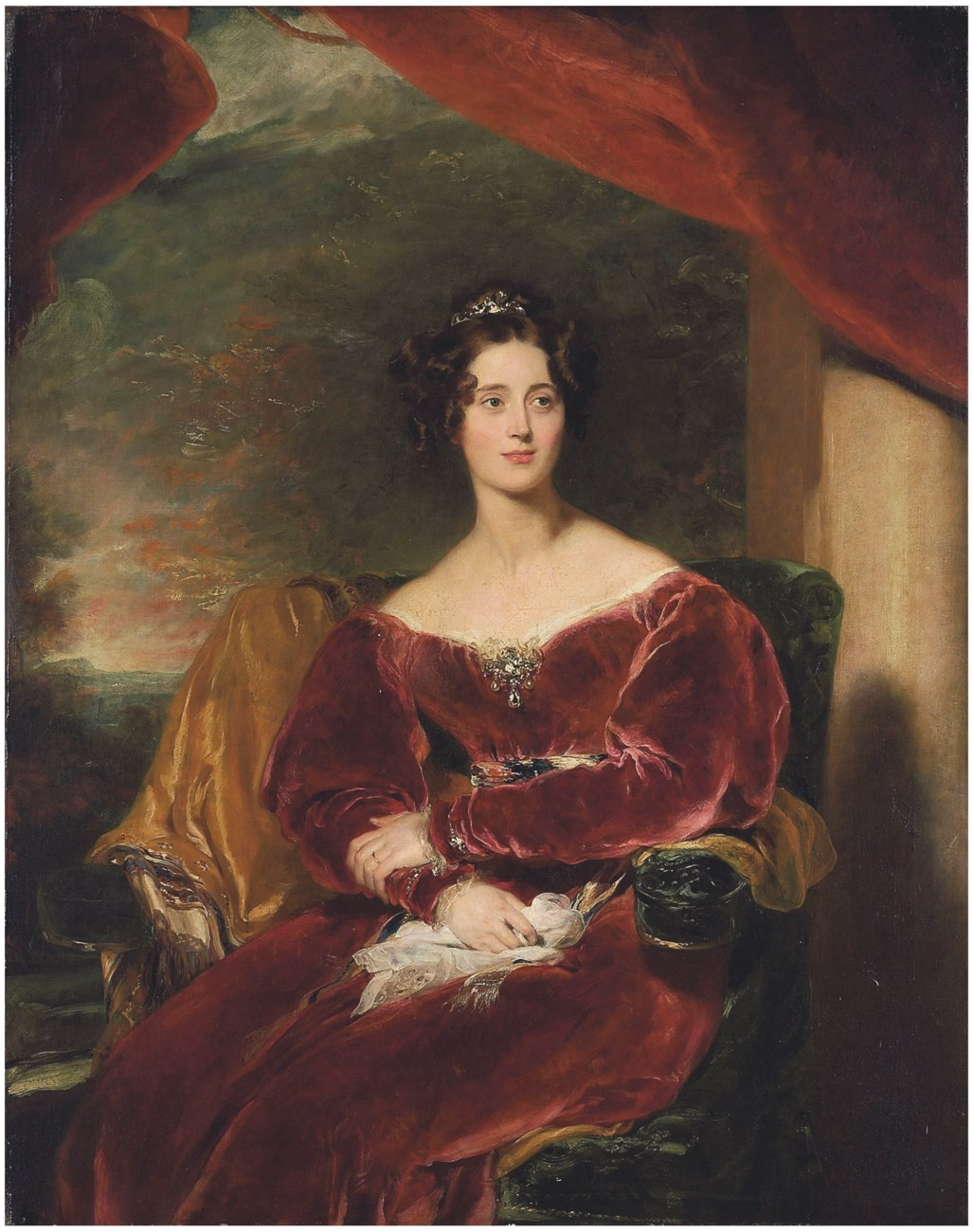
Portrait of the Countess of Wilton by Thomas Lawrence, 1829, depicts Farren's third daughter

On 1 May 1797, she married Edward Smith-Stanley, 12th Earl of Derby (1752–1834). They had three children:

- Lady Lucy Elizabeth Stanley (1 March 1799 – 25 April 1809), died young
- Hon. James Stanley (9 March 1800 – 3 April 1817), died young "after a long and painful illness"
- Lady Mary Margaret Stanley (23 March 1801 – December 1858); married Thomas Egerton, 2nd Earl of Wilton.

She had a short sentimental attachment to John Palmer and was admired and followed by Charles Fox. Lord Derby reportedly treated her with more respect than was usually given to ex-actresses.

Farren reportedly had an affair with Anne Seymour Damer.

Lady Derby died on 23 April 1829 at Knowsley Park, Lancashire.

== Portraits ==
A life-size portrait of her by Sir Thomas Lawrence, now in the Metropolitan Museum of Art, was shown at the Royal Academy annual exhibition in 1790. Another portrait of her was in the Mathews collection in the Garrick Club c. 1900.

[Works cited; Memoirs of the Present Countess of Derby, late Miss Farren, by Petronius Arbiter, esq., London, quarto, n.d. (1797); The Testimony of Truth to the Exalted Merit, or a Biographical Sketch of the Countess of Derby, London, quarto, 1797 (a reply to the preceding); John Genest, Account of the English Stage; Monthly Mirror, April 1797; Thespian Dictionary; Tea-Table Talk, by Mrs. Mathews, 1857.]

== Selected roles ==
- Louisa Freemore in The Double Deception by Elizabeth Richardson (1779)
- Cecilia in The Chapter of Accidents by Sophia Lee (1780)
- Macaria in The Royal Suppliants by John Delap (1781)
- Almeida in The Fair Circassian by Samuel Jackson Pratt (1781)
- Ophelia Wyndham in The School for Vanity by Samuel Jackson Pratt (1783)
- Lady Paragon in The Natural Son by Richard Cumberland (1784)
- Florinda in Tit for Tat by George Colman the Elder (1786)
- Baroness of Bruschal in The Disbanded Officer by James Johnstone (1786)
- Lady Emily in The Heiress by John Burgoyne (1786)
- Donna Seraphina in 'A School for Greybeards by Hannah Cowley (1786)
- Lady Charlotte Courteney in The New Peerage by Harriet Lee (1787)
- Lady Rustic in The Country Attorney by Richard Cumberland (1787)
- Lady Morden in Seduction by Thomas Holcroft (1787)
- Eliza Moreton in The Sword of Peace by Mariana Starke (1788)
- Countess in False Appearances by Henry Seymour Conway (1789)
- Constance in False Colours by Edward Morris (1793)
- Louisa Ratcliffe in The Jew by Richard Cumberland (1794)
- Lady Bellair in The Welch Heiress by Edward Jerningham (1795)
- Emily Tempest in The Wheel of Fortune by Richard Cumberland (1795)
- Jane in The Dependent by Richard Cumberland (1795)
- Lady Ruby in First Love by Richard Cumberland (1795)
- Lady Helen in The Iron Chest by George Colman the Younger (1796)
- Olivia The Man of Ten Thousand by Thomas Holcroft (1796)

== See also ==
- List of entertainers who married titled Britons
