= Mary Bulkley =

English dancer and comedy stage actress

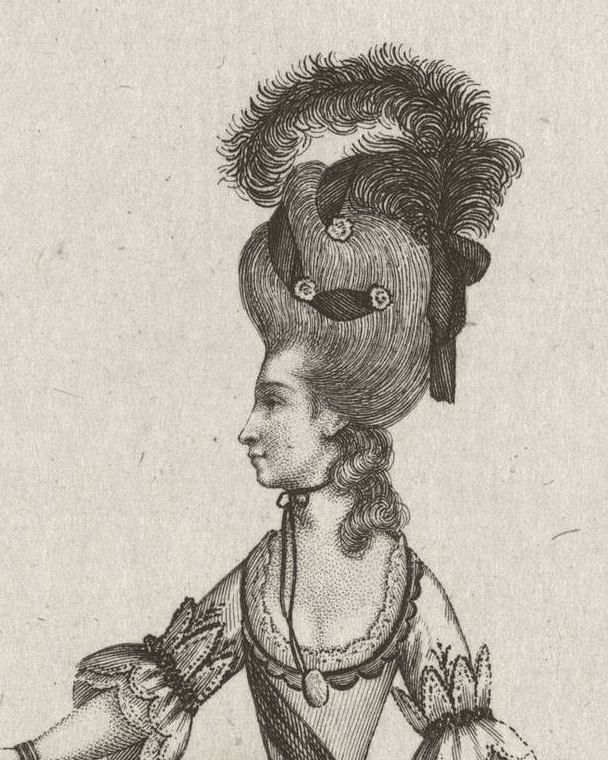
- Mrs Bulkley as Mrs Wilding in Gamesters (1778)
- Born: 1747 or 1748; Possibly London, England
- Died: 19 December 1792 (aged 44 or 45); Dumfries, Scotland
- Other names: Stage names: Mrs Bulkley; Miss Bulkley. Maiden name: Mary Wilford; 2nd married name: Barresford
- Occupations: Dancer, comedian, actor
- Years active: 1758–1791
- Known for: Dancing, acting in Shakespearean and contemporary comedies
- Spouse(s): George Bulkley (d. 1784); Captain Ebenezer Barresford
- Children: 3

Mary Bulkley, née Wilford (1747/8 – 1792), known professionally as Mrs Bulkley, Miss Bulkley, and later Mrs Barresford, was an English eighteenth-century dancer and comedy stage actress. She performed at various theatres, especially Covent Garden Theatre, the Theatre Royal, Dublin, the Theatre Royal, Edinburgh, the Theatre Royal Haymarket and Shrewsbury Theatre. She performed in all or most of the Shakespearean comedies, and in several tragedies, besides many contemporary comedy plays. She played the part of Hamlet at least twice. She was considered a beauty when young, and her talent was praised. She married George Bulkley and later Captain Ebenezer Barresford, and openly took several lovers. Her early career was successful, but later she was hissed on stage due to her extra-marital affairs, and she died in poverty.

== Background ==
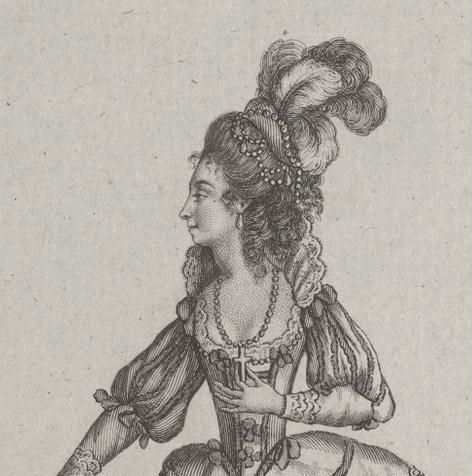
Mary Bulkley (1776)

Mary Bulkley was born as Mary Wilford. Her father was Edward Wilford (d. 1789), an official and treasurer at the Covent Garden Theatre. Because her uncle by marriage John Rich owned the theatre, Mary grew up "in some comfort" in a theatrical environment. By the time she was nineteen or twenty years old, she was beautiful, but "could not sing". Hugh Kelly described her:

Blest with a person wholly without fault;
Tho' polish'd, gay, and natural, though taught,
See where that Wilford elegantly moves,
Leads up the graces, and commands the loves.

— Thespis II (1767))

In the same year, the following poem was anonymously dedicated to her in a newspaper:

How various are the shapes she wears
How lovely she's in all!
Applauding multitudes she chears,
Admirers hopeless fall.
... Yet (blessings on the pious care
That rear's the tender frame)
One here hath claim to all that share
And Wilford is her name.

=== Marriages and affairs ===
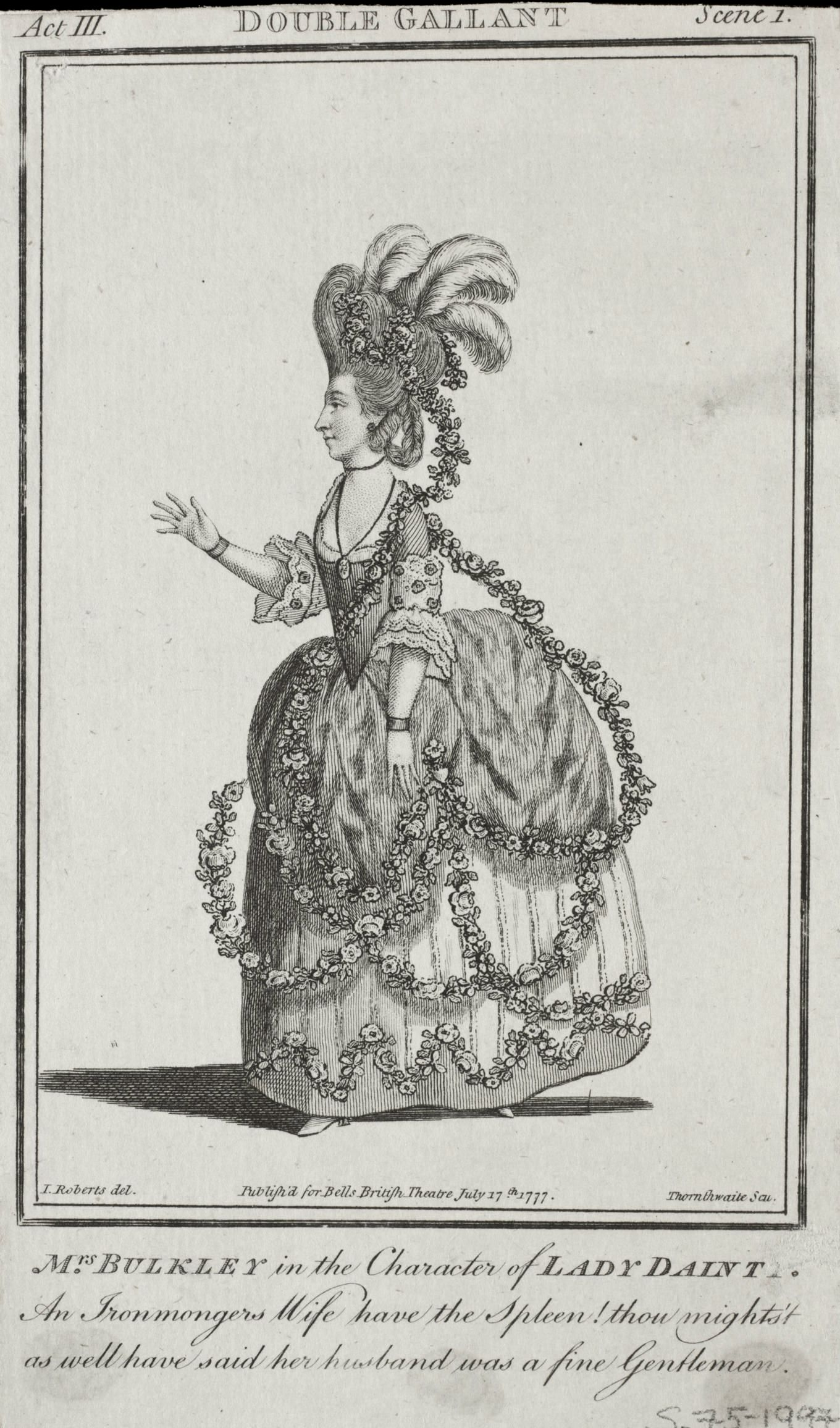
Mrs Bulkley (1777)

On 9 (or 16) August 1767 at Chelsea, when she was about twenty years old, Mary Wilford married George Jackson Bulkley (1742–1784) in Haymarket. He was a Covent Garden orchestra violinist from Yorkshire. George Bulkley was "grateful" and "useful", but "dull." Mary had at least three children, all born during her affair with singer and comedy actor James William Dodd (c. 1740 – 1796). The first was Mary Elizabeth Bulkley (1768–1859), baptised on 9 November 1768 at St Paul Covent Garden. (Note: Mary Elizabeth Bulkley was buried at Manchester General Cemetery in grave 4023.) The second was George Wilford Bulkley (1769–1844), a Newbury and London solicitor. The third was William Fisher Bulkley (1771–1810), baptised 26 September 1771 at Bristol.

Following the affair with Dodd at the King Street Theatre, Bristol, in 1768, there was a scandal. Dodd's wife died after about a year, and public sympathy waned as a result. Nevertheless, Mary Bulkley went with Dodd to Dublin in 1774, but had poor reviews because "Some recent transactions had excited strong prejudices against them." This left Dodd and Mary without money, so for a while she went home to her husband. However she went to live again with Dodd, and worked successfully in 1779 with Tate Wilkinson, manager of the Yorkshire Circuit. In due course there was a scandal involving Bulkley's affairs when she went to live with harlequin John Banks in Scotland, and with actor John (or James) Brown Williamson (d. 1802) around 1782.

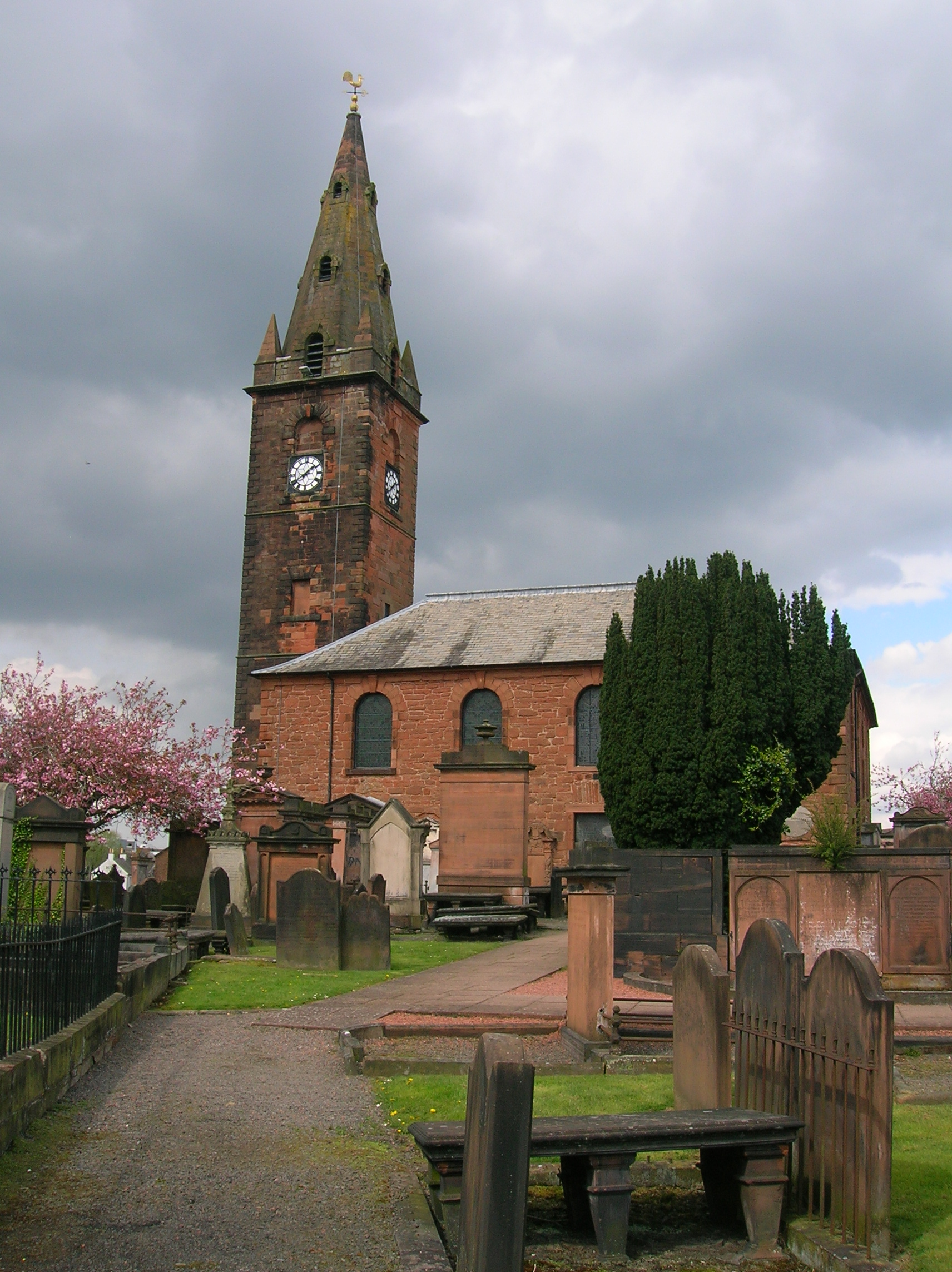
St Michael's, Dumfries, where Bulkley is buried

Having become a widow in 1784, Mary Bulkley married Captain Ebenezer Barresford on 22 July 1788, but by 1791 she was "drinking heavily." Her carriage, overturning on Edinburgh's North Bridge in 1785, caused "hurt," preventing her from performing the following night. That injury may also have contributed to the increase in her drinking. She became "old – sickly – and with a very red face." On 19 September 1792, at the age of forty-four, she died in "wretched pecuniary circumstances" in Dumfries, where she was buried in St Michael's churchyard, "not far from where Burns lies."

== Career ==
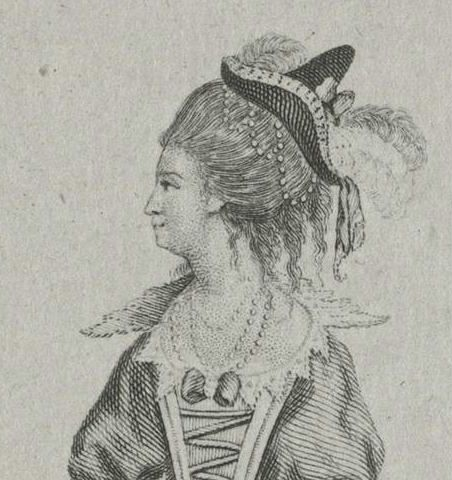
Mrs Bulkley (1776)

Bulkley was a member of the Covent Garden theatre company between 1761 and 1780 or 1781, however her Covent Garden debut in 1758 at the age of ten years was as a dancer. She continued as a dancer there until 1765, when at around 18 years old she first performed as a comedy actress. In 1769 she was involved in a horsemanship display, assisting Mr Hyam who "would drink a glass of wine standing upright on two horses at full speed."

During her career, Bulkley performed in many plays and only some of them are listed below. Her debut as a comedian was at Covent Garden, as Miranda in The Busie Body, by Susanna Centlivre (1709). At the same theatre she performed in the premières of several plays which are now well known. For example, The Good-Natur'd Man (as Miss Richland, 1768), She Stoops to Conquer (as Constantia Hardcastle, 1773), and The Rivals (as Julia Melville, 1775). Although eighteenth-century scholars took care to preserve the accuracy of printed versions of Shakespeare's plays, those plays were heavily edited for performance, to suit contemporary language and taste. In that environment, Bulkley performed in all the Shakespeare comedies, but also played the tragic heroine Cordelia in King Lear, and Portia in The Merchant of Venice.

=== At Covent Garden ===
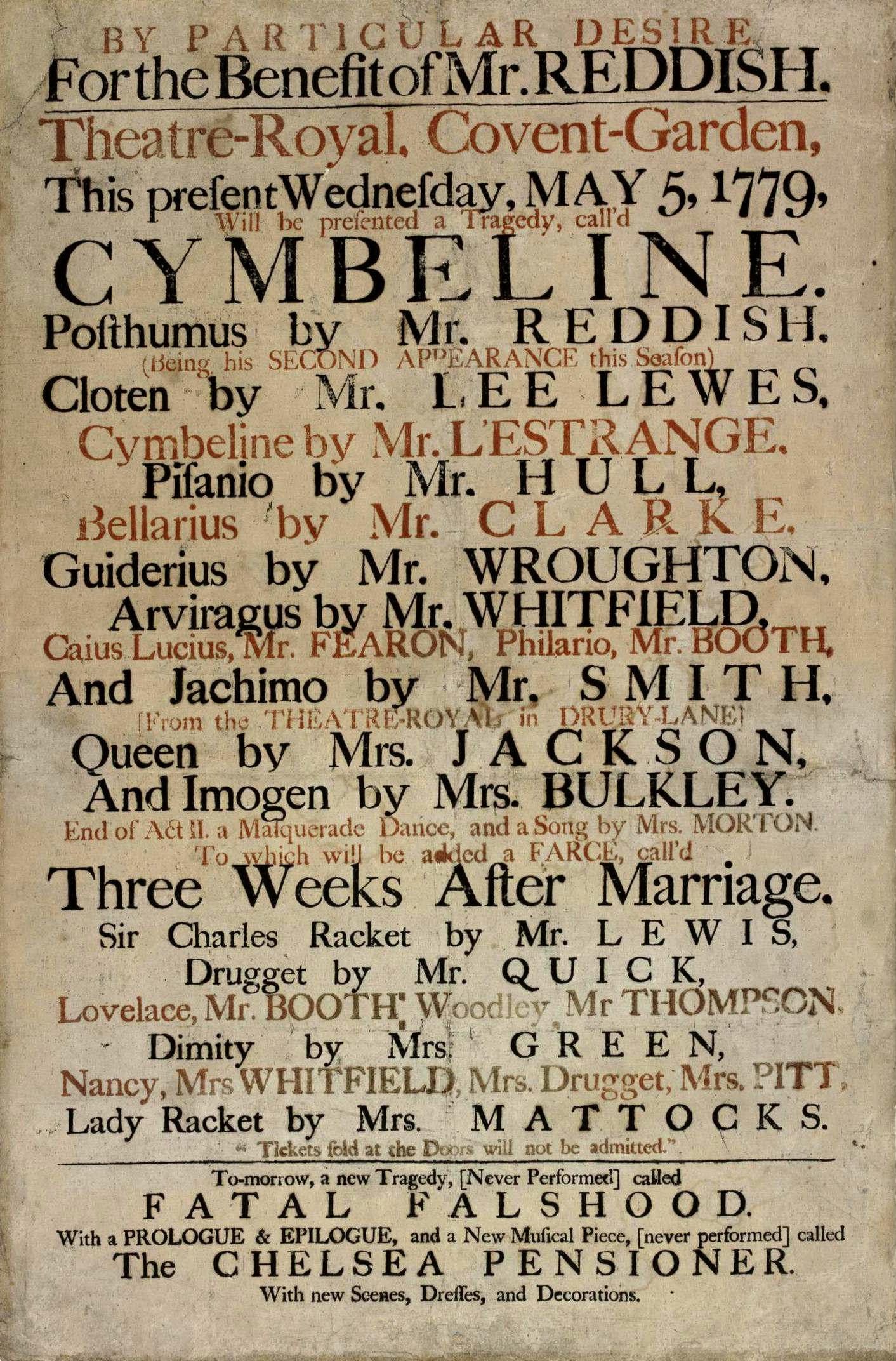
Covent Garden playbill (1779)

In 1773, the première of She Stoops to Conquer by Goldsmith was received at Covent Garden with "great applause," being the "only new comedy that had appeared in (the) theatre for some years." Mary Bulkley played Miss Hardcastle and performed the epilogue, but Hardcastle's song, The Humours of Ballamagairy was omitted because Bulkley could not sing. Present at rehearsals for this première were Oliver Goldsmith, Samuel Johnson and Joshua Reynolds. There was an onstage argument between Mary Bulkley and Ann Catley about who should perform the epilogue, and Goldsmith even suggested rewriting it so that they should perform it together, quarrelling in character, but the owner-director George Colman decided that Bulkley should perform it.

=== Performing with Dodd in Dublin and Shrewsbury ===
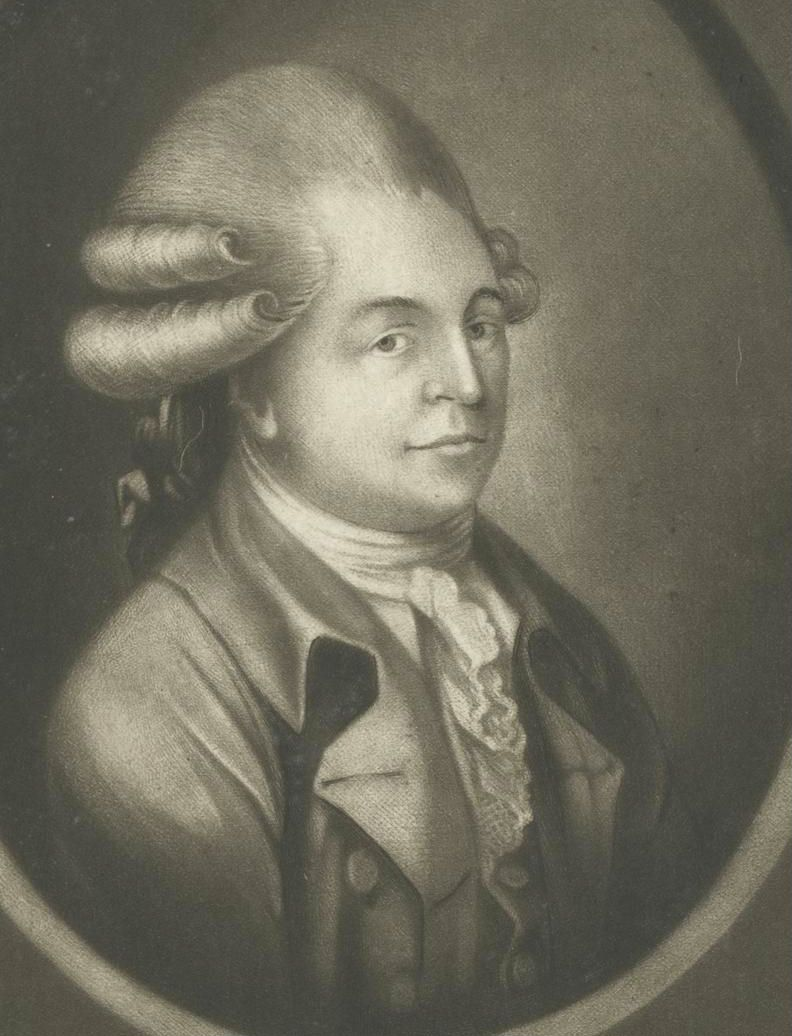
James William Dodd (1779)

On 29 May 1774 Bulkley arrived with her lover Dodd in Dublin. Her first engagement was to play Beatrice in Much Ado About Nothing at the Theatre Royal, Dublin. This play was billed as a "revival" in the Sanders's News-Letter. On one occasion the performance was short enough to be followed by a farce called Miss in her Teens, with Mrs Bulkley in the line-up. A few days later, they were both in The Clandestine Marriage and a farce called The Citizen by Arthur Murphy. In 1775 and 1776 they were in several plays at Shrewsbury Theatre: in 1775 these were Jane Shore by Nicholas Rowe, The English Tars in India, The Country Girl, and The Life and Death of Julius Caesar. A 1775 review in the Shrewsbury Chronicle says: "The performance was universally well received; Mr Dodd and Mrs Bulkley, both in play and farce, displayed, as usual, the most pleasing and excellent abilities as comedians, and gave general satisfaction." In 1776 they played Richard III, and a farce called Bonton or High Life Above Stairs.

=== At Covent Garden again ===
It was between 1776 and 1778 that the engraved portraits of Mary Buckley in performance began to appear in Bell's British Theatre. On the other hand, during the 1779–1780 season, the audience hissed her on one occasion because it had become public knowledge that she had "taken the son of her long-term lover to her bed". She interrupted a performance of the Merchant of Venice, in which she was playing Portia, to respond onstage that, "as an actress she had always done her best to oblige the Public; and as to her private character, she begged to be excused". Her career began to decline after this, and she appeared at Covent Garden less frequently. During the 1783–1784 season she was again hissed onstage, due to audience disapproval of her affairs. Nevertheless, for most of her career her beauty and talent outbalanced her disfavour with moralists, and earned her "poems of praise."

=== Performing with John Banks in Edinburgh ===
It was perhaps around 1781 that Bulkley arrived in Edinburgh with John Banks. When Williamson arrived the same year and took her attention, Banks challenged Williamson and struck him in the dressing room, with no effect on Bulkley's affections.

=== Performing with Williamson in Edinburgh ===
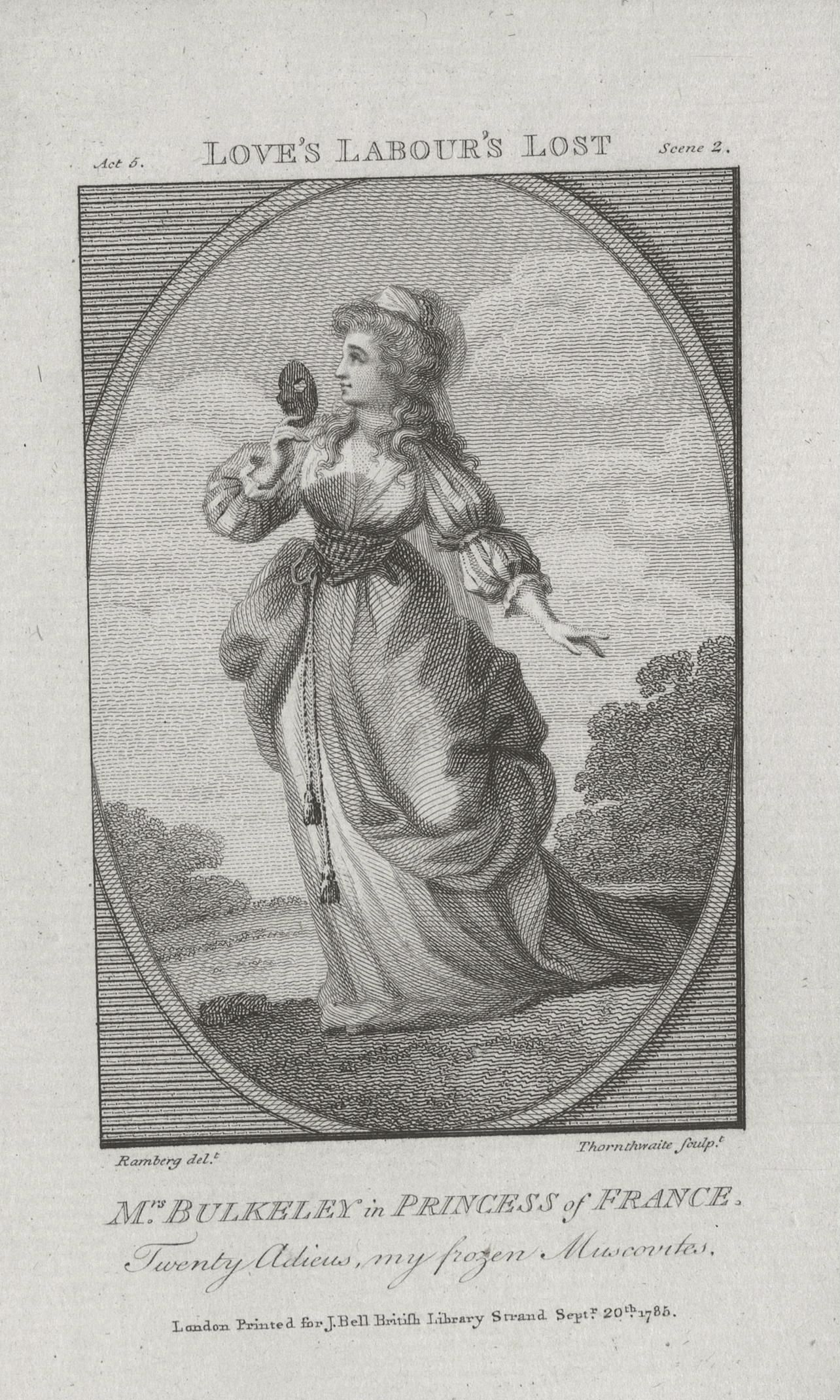
Mrs Bulkley (1785)

The Oxford Dictionary of National Biography says that "public disapproval followed Mary to Scotland," but she did not seem to give up. However, on Bulkley's arrival in January 1782 a spat with the acting manager of the Theatre Royal, Edinburgh, Jackson, about which parts she should take, occasioned a long letter to the Caledonian Mercury, requesting public support. Jackson replied with a long, detailed response in February, below a Royal Theatre playbill omitting Bulkley's name, saying that he would take no notice of her letters. This was followed at the end of April in the same newspaper by an angry exchange of letters between Bulkley's lover Williamson and Jackson, on the subject of payments and credit, in which Williamson pretends that Mrs Bulkley is his wife.

In 1782, Bulkley was indeed performing at the Theatre Royal, Edinburgh with her lover Williamson. They were in the comedy, Wonder, a Woman Keeps a Secret by Susanna Centlivre, and the farce Three Weeks After Marriage by Arthur Murphy. They also played in The Constant Couple by George Farquhar, and The Rivals, as well as The Maid of the Oaks and An Englishman in Paris by Samuel Foote which both featured a minuet performed by Williamson and Bulkley.

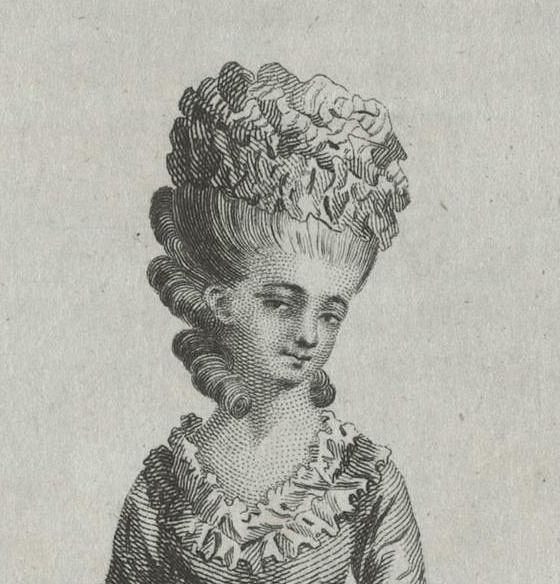
Mrs Bulkley (1780)

On 23 March 1784, Bulkley played the part of Hamlet successfully at the Theatre Royal, Edinburgh. By April 1785, Bulkley was still performing in Edinburgh, but without Williamson, in The Clandestine Marriage, The Jealous Wife and A Trip to Scarborough, The Critic, and reciting the epilogue Belles Have At Ye All by Thomas Covey. Still apparently without Williamson, in May she was performing Rule a Wife and Have a Wife, a farce called Deuce Is In Him by George Coleman, Wonder; A Woman Keeps a Secret, and The Sultan by Isaac Bickerstaffe. In the same month she played the part of Hamlet, played in Rule a Wife and Have a Wife, School for Scandal, A Trip to Scarborough and Three Weeks After Marriage, and again performed Belles Have At Ye All, and Deuce Is In Him.

By 1788 Bulkey was performing with Williamson in Edinburgh again, in Much Ado About Nothing, The Sultan, and The Provok'd Husband by John Vanburgh and Colley Cibber, Tender Husband, by Richard Steele, The Wonder; A Woman Keeps a Secret, Belles Have At Ye All, The Maid of the Oaks, The School for Wives, Young Quaker by John O'Keeffe, The Deuce Is In Him, and performing a dance called Jamie's Return, besides the Williamson and Bulkley minuet.

=== Performing as Mrs Barresford ===
During this period, Williamson is often recorded on playbills as acting alongside her. As Mrs Barresford, she performed in Edinburgh between 1789 and 1791. She was nearing the end of her life and was perhaps already ill, but she was apparently working regularly, and still received praise from the manager, Jackson:

How admirably Mr King is supported by Mrs Barresford's performance – her merits as an actress are universally allowed; and, for my own part, I cannot say that ever I saw her in any character she did not support according to my most sanguine expectations. Mr King's Sir Peter, and her Lady Teazle, was as complete a piece of acting as one could see within the walls of a Theatre.

—Caledonian Mercury, 1789

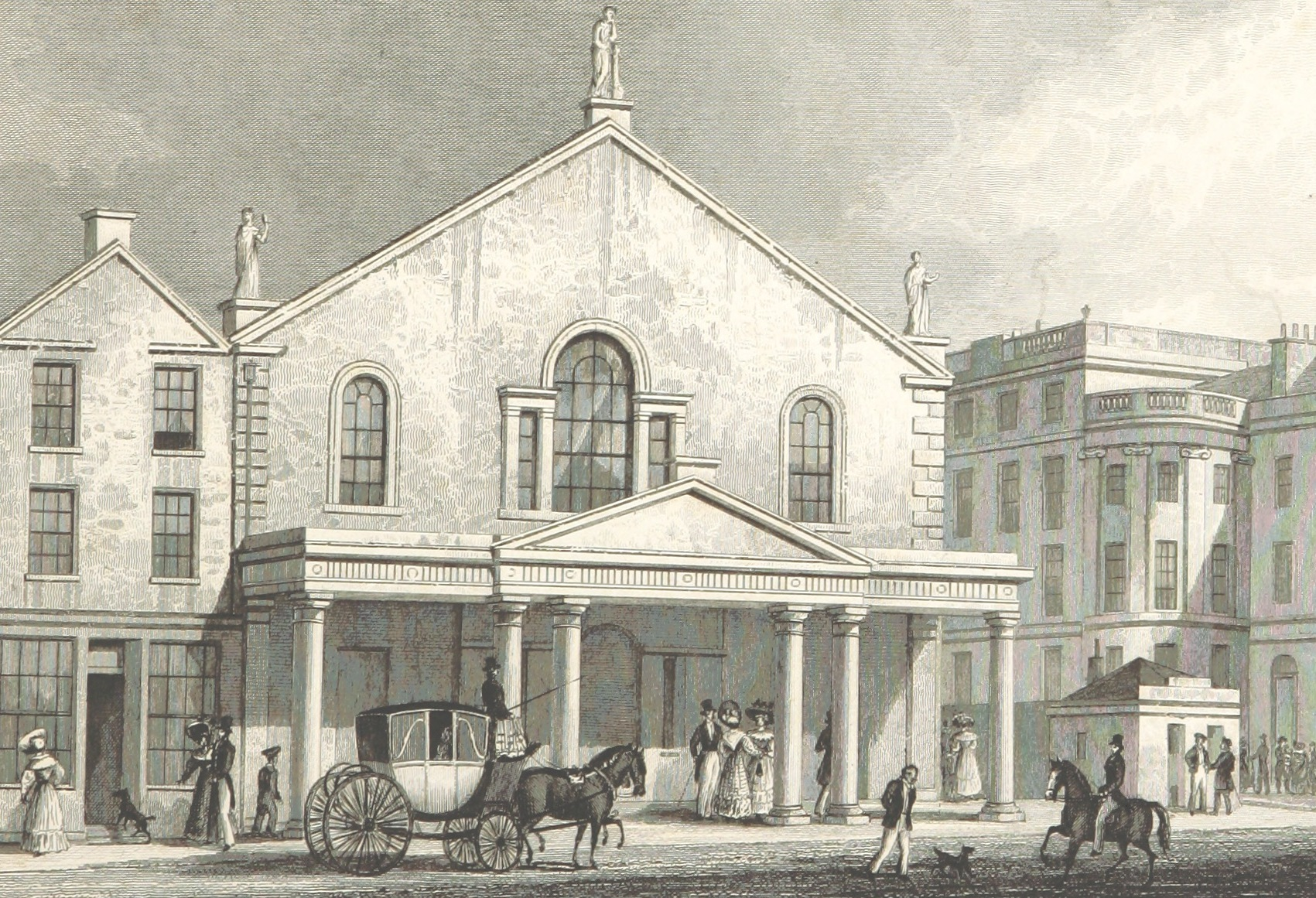
Theatre Royal, Edinburgh

In 1789 Mrs Barresford was in The Clandestine Marriage and The Citizen. She played in The English Merchant by George Colman, The Pannel and The Heiress. She was in All in the Wrong by Arthur Murphy, English Merchant by George Colman, The Beaux' Stratagem, The Critic, and The Pannel. In 1790 she played Hippolyta in The Tempest, Fatima in Cymon, Lady Gayville in The Heiress, Lady Lardoon in the farce The Maid of the Oaks which included the Williamson and Barresford minuet, The Brothers, Three Weeks After Marriage, and she spoke the epilogue to Vimonda by Andrew Macdonald. In 1791 she played Lady Macbeth for the first time, and at the end of the play danced a minuet with Mr Aldridge. On the same night she played a fine lady in the farce Lethe, or Aesop in the Shade by David Garrick. She appeared in I'll Tell You What by Elizabeth Inchbald, and in The Miser. She played the Queen in Hamlet, and was in the farce Three Weeks After Marriage again, The Fashionable Lover with her usual minuet, and Tit For Tat by Charlotte Charke. She was engaged for the 1792 season, but it is not known whether she performed that year.

=== Decline 1780–1792 ===
During her Edinburgh years Bulkley was employed for the summer seasons at the Haymarket Theatre. She managed to work Drury Lane briefly in 1782, and for the 1783–1784 season, and one Covent Garden appearance as Mrs Barresford in 1789–1790. There was little work during winter months. During 1784 she worked with strolling actors in Shrewsbury. At one point she was rescued by John Jackson of the Theatre Royal, Edinburgh. She was with the Theatre Royal Edinburgh company until 1791, around the time when Williamson became deputy manager. After her death he performed on the Continent and in America, to little success.
