= The West Indian =

Play by Richard Cumberland

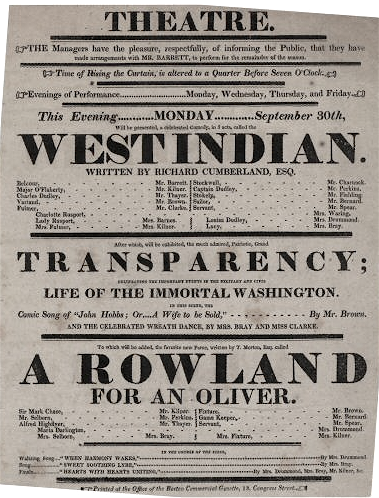
- Original language: English
- Written by: Richard Cumberland
- Genre: Comedy
- Setting: London, present day

Premiere
- Date: 19 January 1771
- Place: Theatre Royal, Drury Lane, London

The West Indian is a play by Richard Cumberland first staged at the Drury Lane Theatre in 1771. A comedy, it depicts Belcour, a West Indian plantation owner, travelling to Britain. Belcour tries to overcome his father's lingering disapproval of him and marry his sweetheart Louisa. Its hero, who probably owes much to the suggestion of David Garrick, is a young scapegrace fresh from the tropics, "with rum and sugar enough belonging to him to make all the water in the Thames into punch", a libertine with generous instincts, which prevail in the end. The early example of the modern drama was favorably received. Boden translated it into German, and Goethe acted in it at the Weimar court.

The play was a success running for 28 performances in its original run and was Cumberland's most popular comic work. One of the Drury Lane staff observed "the success which has attended the performances of The West Indian has exceeded that of any comedy within the memory of the oldest man living". The original Drury Lane cast included Francis Aickin as Stockwell, Thomas King as Belcour, John Hayman Packer as Captain Dudley, Samuel Cautherley as Charles Dudley, John Moody as Major O'Flaherty, James Aickin as Stukely, Robert Baddeley as Fulmer, William Parsons as Varland, Elizabeth Hopkins as Lady Rusport, Frances Abington as Charlotte Rusport, Sophia Baddeley as Louisa and Mary Bradshaw as Stockwell's Housekeeper.

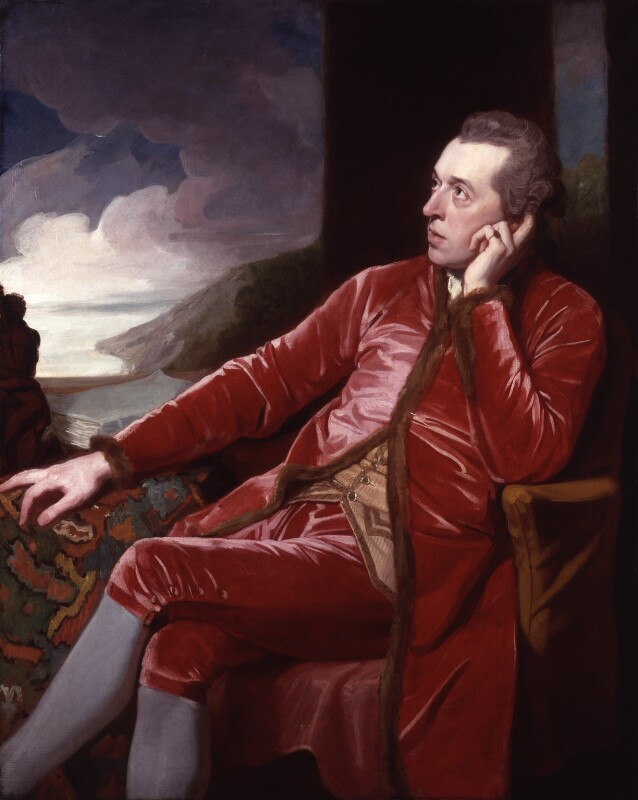
Portrait of Richard Cumberland by George Romney, c.1776

The play proved popular in North America and was staged in the West Indies, British North America and the United States. It was the first English-language play known to have been staged in Jersey (on 5 May 1792). It was staged at Yale on April 13, 1773 by an all-male cast, who were members of the Linonian literary society, which included Nathan Hale and David Bushnell. A popular character was the Irishman Major O'Flaherty, who reappeared in the 1785 play The Natural Son.

The play was one of a number written by Cumberland that contained sympathetic depictions of colonists from the British Empire.

On 17 April 1804, the play was performed at the Theatre Royal, York. It was attended by Jane Ewbank, who commented as follows in her diary:

"Went to the Play, the West Indian; the part of Belcour would have been performed well by Melvin, had he been more the gentleman... "

(York Courant, 16 April 1804).

== Bibliography ==
- Arnold, Albert James. A History of Literature in the Caribbean: English- and Dutch-speaking countries. John Benjamins Publishing, 2001.
- Greene, John C. Theatre in Dublin, 1745-1820: A Calendar of Performances, Volume 6. Lexington Books, 2011.
- Nettleton, George H. & Case, Arthur E. British Dramatists from Dryden to Sheridan. Southern Illinois University Press, 1975.
