= The Carmelite =

1784 play

- Original language: English
- Written by: Richard Cumberland
- Genre: Tragedy

Premiere
- Date: 2 December 1784
- Place: Theatre Royal, Drury Lane, London

The Carmelite is a 1784 tragedy by the British writer Richard Cumberland. It was first staged at the Drury Lane Theatre on 2 December 1784. The play's hero Saint-Valori disguises himself as a Carmelite. The original cast included Sarah Siddons as Matilda, William Smith as Saint Valori, John Palmer as Lord Hildebrand, John Philip Kemble as Montgomeri, James Aickin as Lord De Courci, John Hayman Packer as Gyfford, John Phillimore as Fitzallan and John Fawcett as Raymond. The play enjoyed some success, and was later staged at a theatre in Belfast where Wolfe Tone saw it in 1791.

== Bibliography ==
- Moody, TW (ed.). The writings of Theobald Wolfe Tone: 1763 - 98. Volume I, Tone's career in Ireland to June 1795. Oxford University Press, 1998.
- Nicoll, Allardyce. A History of English Drama 1660-1900. Volume III: Late Eighteenth Century Drama. Cambridge University Press, 1952.
- Watson, George. The New Cambridge Bibliography of English Literature: Volume 2, 1660–1800. Cambridge University Press, 1971.
