= Portrait of Richard Cumberland =

Painting by George Romney

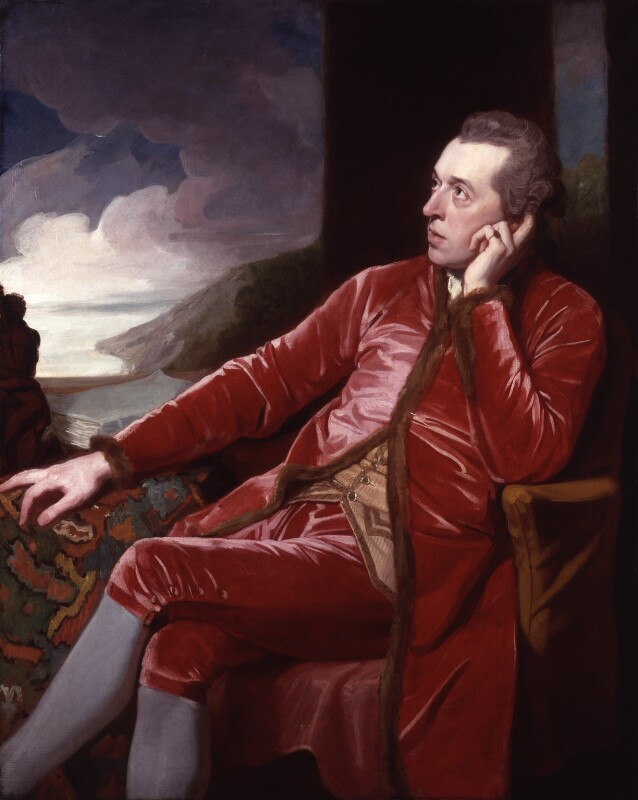
- Artist: George Romney
- Year: c.1776
- Type: Oil on canvas, portrait
- Dimensions: 124.5 cm × 99.1 cm (49.0 in × 39.0 in)
- Location: National Portrait Gallery; London

Portrait of Richard Cumberland is a c.1776 portrait painting by the British artist George Romney of the playwright and diplomat Richard Cumberland.

Cumberland was a popular writer whose plays such as The West Indian had appeared in London's West End. During the late 1770s he went on a mission to Madrid in an unsuccessful attempt to prevent Spanish entry into the American War of Independence. Romney was a top portraitist of the Georgian era. Today the work is in the collection of the National Portrait Gallery on Trafalgar Square having been purchased from the sitter's grandson in 1857.

== Bibliography ==
- Cross, David. A Striking Likeness: The Life of George Romney. Routledge, 2019.
- Kidson, Alex. George Romney, 1734-1802. National Portrait Gallery, 2002.
- O'Quinn, Daniel. Entertaining Crisis in the Atlantic Imperium, 1770–1790. JHU Press, 2011.
- Schwanecke, Christine. A Narratology of Drama: Dramatic Storytelling in Theory, History, and Culture from the Renaissance to the Twenty-First Century. Walter de Gruyter, 2022.
