= The Heiress (1786 play) =

1786 play by John Burgoyne

- Original language: English
- Written by: John Burgoyne
- Genre: Comedy

Premiere
- Date: 14 January 1786
- Place: Theatre Royal, Drury Lane, London

The Heiress is a comedy play by the British playwright and soldier John Burgoyne. The play debuted at the Drury Lane Theatre on 14 January 1786. It concerns the engagement of Lord Gayville to Miss Alscrip, a fashionable woman he believes to be an heiress. Gayville later discovers that the woman who really stands to inherit the fortune is his true love Miss Clifford. The play was an enormous success, running for 31 performances in its initial season and revived again at Drury Lane for many seasons afterwards; the theatre historian John Genest called it the best new comedy since The School for Scandal. The play was initially anonymous, but Burgoyne was soon widely reported to be the author and he acknowledged this after the play's debut.

The original Drury Lane cast included Thomas King as Sir Clement Flint, John Palmer as Lord Gayville, William Parsons as Alscrip, Robert Baddeley as Chignon, John Bannister as Mr Blandish, James Aickin as Mr Rightly, Robert Palmer as Prompt, Jane Pope as Mrs Alscrip, Charlotte Tidswell as Tiffany and Elizabeth Farren as Lady Emily.

== Bibliography ==
- The Adams Papers: The Adams Family Correspondence. Volume 7, January 1786 - February 1787. Massachusetts Historical Society, 2005.
- Hogan, C.B (ed.) The London Stage, 1660–1800: Volume V. Southern Illinois University Press, 1968.
- Thomson, Peter. The Cambridge Introduction to English Theatre, 1660-1900. Cambridge University Press, 2006.
