= The Natural Son =

1785 comedy play by the British writer Richard Cumberland

- Original language: English
- Written by: Richard Cumberland
- Genre: Comedy

Premiere
- Date: 22 December 1784
- Place: Theatre Royal, Drury Lane

The Natural Son is a comedy play by the British writer Richard Cumberland. It was first staged at the Drury Lane Theatre in London in December 1784. The play is notable for the return of the popular character Major O'Flaherty from Cumberland's 1771 play The West Indian.

The original Drury Lane cast included Thomas King as Jack Hustings, William Parsons as Dumps, Robert Bensley as Ruefull, John Moody as Major O'Flaherty, Sophia Baddeley as Sir Jeffrey Latimer, James Wrighten as David, John Palmer as Blushenly, Jane Pope as Miss Phoebe Latimer, Charlotte Tidswell as Penelope and Elizabeth Farren as Lady Paragon.

== Sources ==
- Baines, Paul & Ferraro, Julian & Rogers, Pat. The Wiley-Blackwell Encyclopaedia of Eighteenth-Century Writers and Writing, 1660-1789. Wiley-Blackwell, 2011.
- Hogan, C.B (ed.) The London Stage, 1660–1800: Volume V. Southern Illinois University Press, 1968.
- Nicoll, Allardyce. A History of English Drama 1660-1900. Volume III: Late Eighteenth Century Drama. Cambridge University Press, 1952.
- Welch, Robert & Stewart, Bruce. The Oxford Companion to Irish Literature. Oxford University Press, 1996.
