= Love Makes a Man =

1700 play

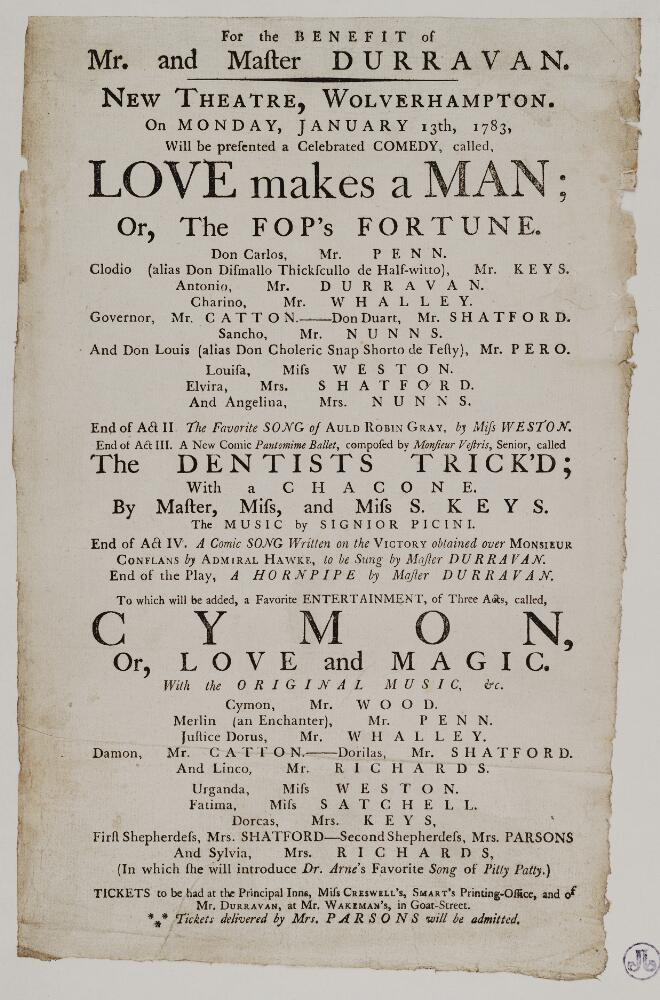
- 1783 poster
- Original language: English
- Written by: Colley Cibber
- Genre: Comedy

Premiere
- Date: 9 December 1700
- Place: Theatre Royal, Drury Lane, London

Love Makes A Man; Or, The Fop's Fortune is a comedy play by the English writer Colley Cibber written and first performed in 1700, and first published in 1701. It borrows elements from two Jacobean plays The Elder Brother and The Custom of the Country by John Fletcher.

It was originally staged at the Theatre Royal, Drury Lane with a cast that included Robert Wilks as Carlos, William Bullock as Antonio, Richard Cross as Charino, William Pinkethman as Don Lewis, Colley Cibber as Clodio, Henry Norris as Sancho, Thomas Simpson as Governor, John Mills as Don Duart, Susanna Verbruggen as Louisa, Henrietta Moore as Honoria and Frances Maria Knight as Elvira.

== Bibliography ==
- Van Lennep, W. The London Stage, 1660-1800: Volume Two, 1700-1729. Southern Illinois University Press, 1960.
