= The Clandestine Marriage =

Comedy by George Colman the Elder and David Garrick

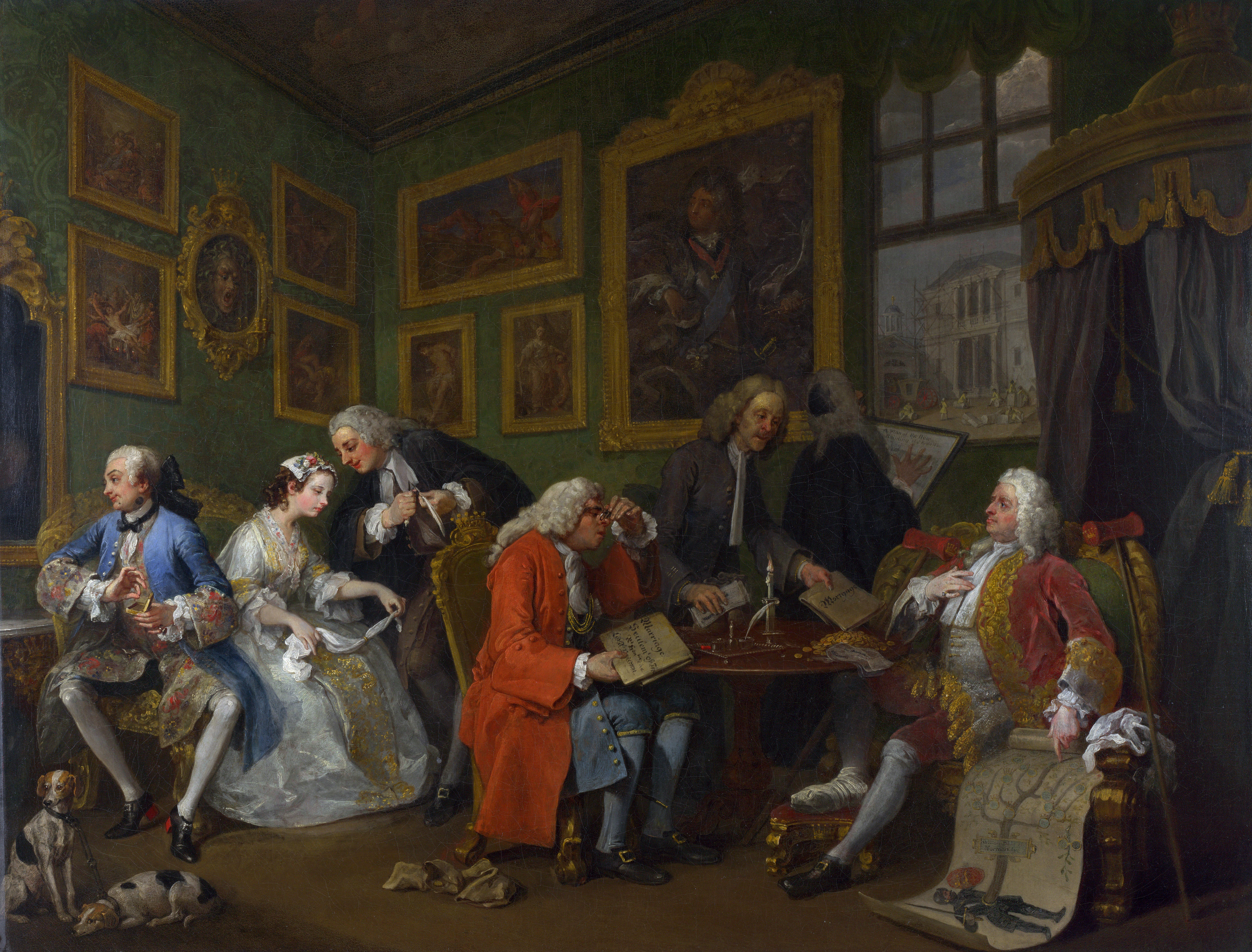
William Hogarth's Marriage à-la-mode, panel 1. "The Marriage Settlement", which inspired Colman and Garrick to write The Clandestine Marriage.

The Clandestine Marriage is a comedy by George Colman the Elder and David Garrick, first performed in 1766 at Drury Lane. It is both a comedy of manners and a comedy of errors. The idea came from a series of pictures by William Hogarth entitled Marriage à-la-mode.

== Plot summary ==
The plot concerns a merchant, Mr Sterling, who wants to marry off his elder daughter to Sir John Melvil, who is actually in love with her younger sister, Fanny. Fanny, however, is in love with a humble clerk, Lovewell, whom she has secretly married. Her attempts to extricate herself from the arrangement with Melvil lead to her becoming the proposed bride of Melvil's elderly uncle, Lord Ogleby. When the truth comes out, Fanny and Lovewell are forgiven.

== Performances ==
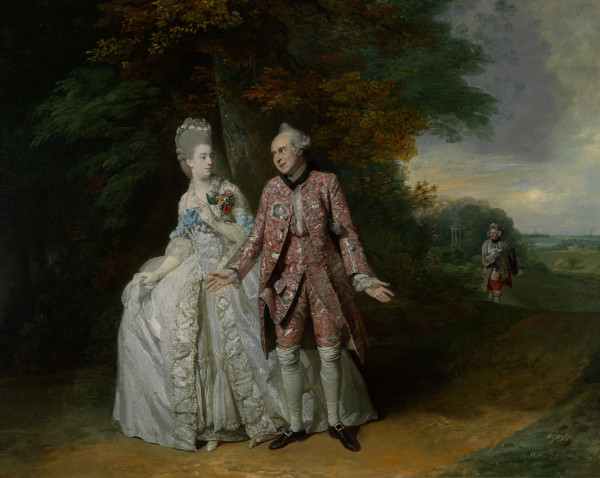
Sophia Baddeley, Robert Baddeley, Thomas King by Johan Zoffany in a Royal command performance of the Clandestine Marriage in 1769.

=== Play and painting ===
On 12 October 1769 the play was performed as a Royal Command Performance with Sophia Baddeley, Robert Baddeley and Thomas King appearing. These three were recorded acting in an oil painting by Johan Zoffany.

=== Opera ===
The play was adapted into an opéra comique Sophie, ou le Mariage caché by Josef Kohaut, which was first staged by Comédie-Italienne in Hôtel de Bourgogne on 4 June 1768.

In 1792, the play was made into another opera: Il matrimonio segreto by Domenico Cimarosa.

=== Film ===
In 1999, the play was made into a film directed by Christopher Miles and starred Nigel Hawthorne, Joan Collins, Timothy Spall, Emma Chambers and Tom Hollander. The screenplay was written by Trevor Bentham.
