= Richard Cumberland (dramatist) =

English dramatist and civil servant (1732–1811)

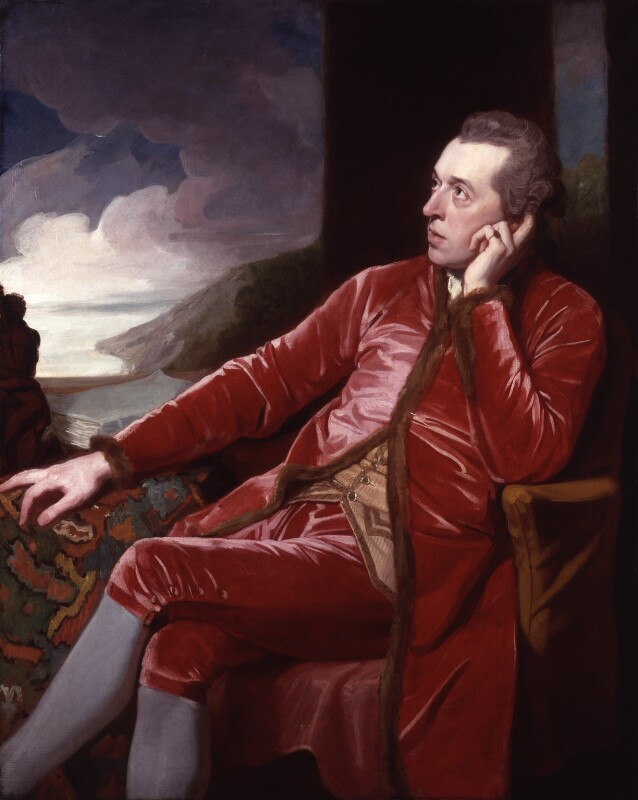
- Portrait of Richard Cumberland by George Romney, c. 1776
- Born: 19 February 1732; Trinity College, Cambridge
- Died: 7 May 1811 (aged 79); London, England
- Occupations: Dramatist, civil servant

Richard Cumberland (19 February 1731/2 – 7 May 1811) was an English dramatist and civil servant. In 1771 his hit play The West Indian was first staged. During the American War of Independence he acted as a secret negotiator with Spain in an effort to secure a Spanish peace agreement with Britain. He also edited a short-lived critical journal called The London Review (1809). His plays are often remembered for their sympathetic depiction of characters on the margins of Britain and its empire.

== Early life and education ==
Richard Cumberland was born in the master's lodge of Trinity College, Cambridge on 19 February 1731/2. His father was a clergyman, Doctor Denison Cumberland, who was at the time of his birth rector of the Church of St Laurence, Stanwick, residing at The Old Rectory, Stanwick, Richard's childhood home.

Denison Cumberland became successively Bishop of Clonfert and Bishop of Kilmore, and through him his great-grandfather was Richard Cumberland, the philosopher and bishop of Peterborough. His mother was Johanna Bentley, youngest daughter of Joanna Bernard and the classical scholar Richard Bentley, longtime master at Trinity College. She was featured as the heroine of John Byrom's popular eclogue, Colin and Phoebe. Cumberland's youngest sister Mary became recognized later as the poet Mary Alcock. A great-great grandfather was Oliver St John, the statesman.

Cumberland was educated at the grammar school in Bury St Edmunds. He later related how, when the headmaster Arthur Kinsman told Bentley he would make his grandson an equally good scholar, Bentley retorted: "Pshaw, Arthur, how can that be, when I have forgot more than thou ever knewest?" In 1744 Cumberland was moved to the prestigious Westminster School, under Doctor Nicholl as headmaster. Among his contemporaries at Westminster were Warren Hastings, George Colman, Charles Churchill and William Cowper. At the age of fourteen, Cumberland went to Trinity College, Cambridge, where in 1750 he took his degree as tenth wrangler. In his beginning writing, he was influenced by Edmund Spenser; his first dramatic effort was modeled after William Mason's Elfrida and called Caractacus.

== Political and diplomatic career ==
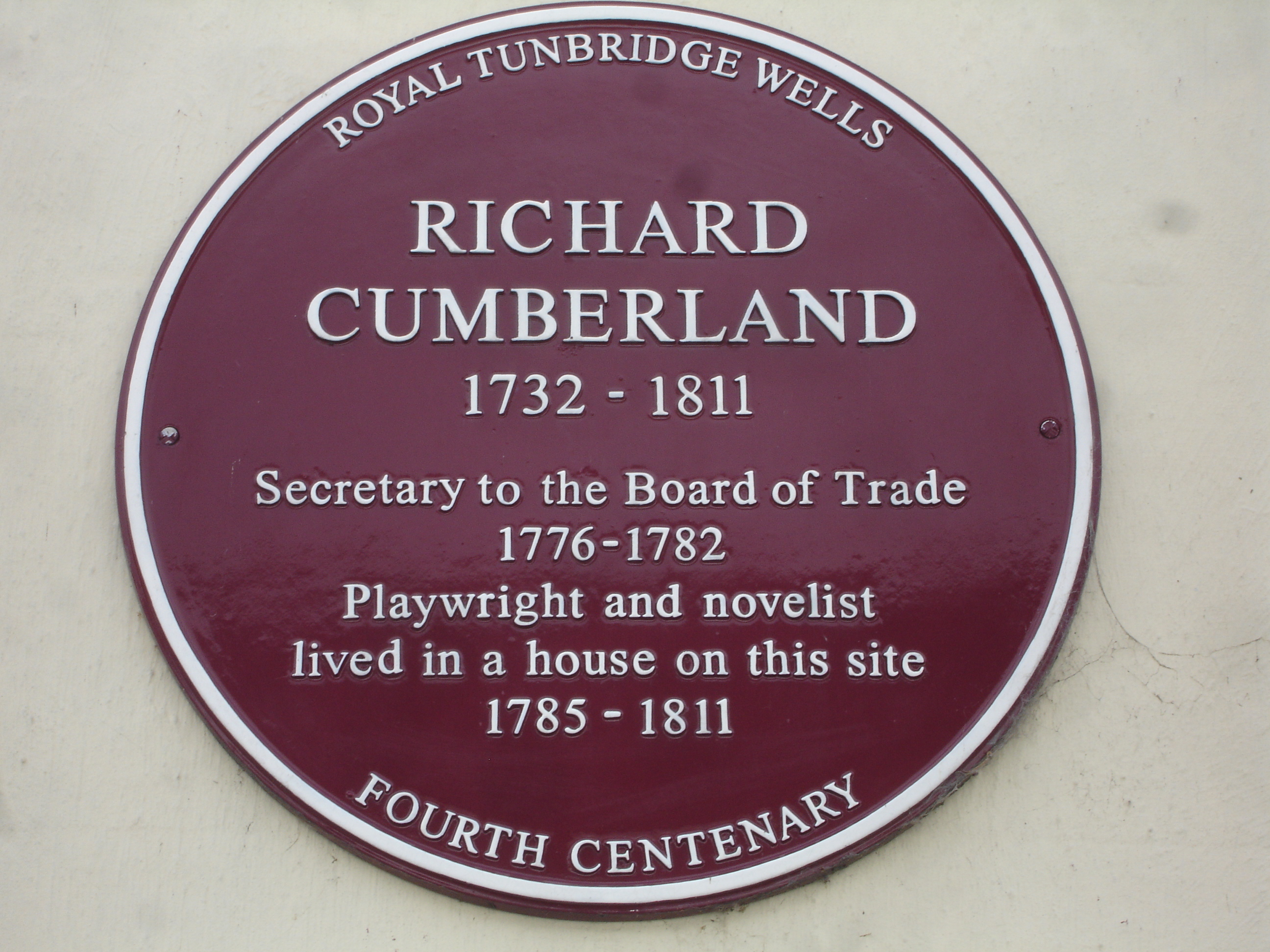
Commemorative red plaque on the site of Cumberland's former residence in Tunbridge Wells.

He had begun to read for his fellowship at Trinity when the Earl of Halifax who had been made President of the Board of Trade in the Duke of Newcastle's government offered him the post of private secretary. Cumberland's family persuaded him to accept, and he returned to the post after his election as fellow. It left him time for literary pursuits, which included a poem in blank verse about India.

Cumberland resigned his fellowship when he married his cousin Elizabeth Ridge in 1759, after having been appointed through Lord Halifax as "crown-agent for Nova Scotia."

In 1761 Cumberland accompanied his patron Lord Halifax to Ireland. Halifax who had been appointed Lord Lieutenant of Ireland and Cumberland the post as Ulster secretary. He was offered a baronetcy, which he declined. When in 1762 Halifax became Northern Secretary, Cumberland applied for the post of under-secretary, but could only obtain the less prestigious clerkship of reports at the Board of Trade under Lord Hillsborough.

When Lord George Germain in 1775 acceded to office, Cumberland was appointed secretary to the Board of Trade and Plantations, a post he held till Edmund Burke's reforms abolished it in 1782.

=== Mission to Madrid ===
In 1780, he was sent on a confidential mission to Spain to negotiate a separate peace treaty during the American War of Independence in an effort to weaken the anti-British coalition. Although he was well received by King Charles III of Spain and his minister, the Count of Floridablanca, the question of which nation would hold sway over Gibraltar prevented resolution. Recalled by the government in 1781, Cumberland was refused repayment of his expenses although his advance was insufficient. He was £4500 out of pocket and never recovered his money. Soon afterward, Cumberland lost his office in Burke's reforms and retired on an allowance of less than half-pay. In 1785, he wrote a defence of his former superior, Character of the late Lord Viscount Sackville.

He took up residence at Tunbridge Wells; but during his last years he mostly lived in London, where he died. He was buried in Westminster Abbey, after a short oration by his friend Dean Vincent.

== Writing career ==
Cumberland wrote much but has been remembered most for his plays and memoirs. The existence of his memoirs is largely due to his friend, the critic Richard Sharp, (Conversation Sharp) who together with Samuel Rogers and Sir James Burges (Sir James Lamb, 1st Baronet) gave considerable support to the endeavour. The collection of essays and other pieces entitled The Observer (1785), afterwards republished with a translation of The Clouds, was included among The British Essayists.

He is said to have joined Sir James Bland Burges in an epic, the Exodiad (1807), and in a novel, John de Lancaster. Besides these he wrote the Letter to the Bishop of Oxford in vindication of his grandfather Bentley (1767); another to Richard Watson, Bishop of Llandaff, on his proposal for equalizing the revenues of the Established Church (1783); a Character of Lord Sackville (1785), whom in his Memoirs he vindicates from the stigma of cowardice; and an anonymous pamphlet, Curtius rescued from the Gulf, against the redoubtable Dr Parr. He was the author of a version of 50 of the Psalms of David; of a tract on the evidences of Christianity; and of other religious pieces in prose and verse, the former including "as many sermons as would make a large volume, some of which have been delivered from the pulpits." Lastly, he edited a short-lived critical journal called The London Review (1809), intended to be a rival to the Quarterly, with signed articles.

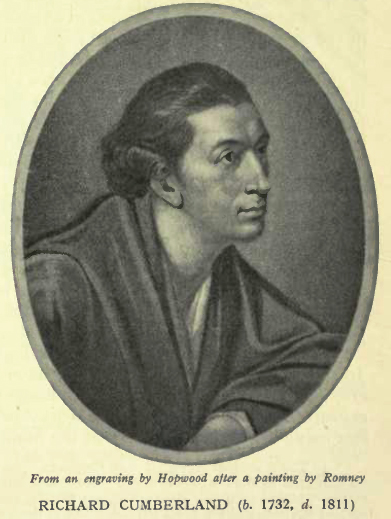

His plays, published and unpublished, totalled fifty-four. About 35 of these are ordinary plays, to which have been added four operas and a farce; about half are comedies. His favourite mode was the "sentimental comedy," which combines domestic plots, rhetorical enforcement of moral precepts, and comic humour. He weaves his plays out of "homely stuff, right British drugget," and eschews "the vile Gallic stage"; he borrowed from the style of sentimental fiction of Samuel Richardson, Henry Fielding and Laurence Sterne.

His favourite theme is virtue in distress or danger, but assured of its reward in the fifth act; his most constant characters are men of feeling and young ladies who are either prudes or coquettes. Cumberland's comic talents lay in the invention of characters taken from the "outskirts of the empire," and intended to vindicate the good elements of the Scots, Irish and colonials from English prejudice. The plays are highly patriotic and adhere to conventional morality. If Cumberland's dialogue lacks brilliance and his characters reality, the construction of the plots is generally skilful, due to Cumberland's insight into the secrets of theatrical effect. Though Cumberland's sentimentality is often wearisome, his morality is generally sound; that if he was without the genius requisite for elevating the national drama, he did his best to keep it pure and sweet; and that if he borrowed much, he borrowed only the best aspects of other dramatists' work.

His first play was a tragedy, The Banishment of Cicero, published in 1761 after David Garrick rejected it; this was followed in 1765 by a musical drama, The Summer's Tale, subsequently compressed into an afterpiece Amelia (1768). Cumberland first essayed sentimental comedy in The Brothers (1769). This play is inspired by Henry Fielding's Tom Jones; its comic characters are the jolly old tar Captain Ironsides, and the henpecked husband Sir Benjamin Dove, whose progress to self-assertion is genuinely comic. Horace Walpole said, that it acted well, but read ill, though he could distinguish in it "strokes of Mr Bentley."

The epilogue paid a compliment to Garrick, who helped the production of Cumberland's second comedy The West-Indian (1771). Its hero, who probably owes much to the suggestion of Garrick, is a young scapegrace fresh from the tropics, "with rum and sugar enough belonging to him to make all the water in the Thames into punch,"—a libertine with generous instincts, which prevail in the end. This early example of the modern drama was favourably received; Boden translated it into German, and Goethe acted in it at the Weimar court. The Fashionable Lover (1772) is a sentimental comedy, as is The Choleric Man (1774), founded on the Adelphi of Terence. Cumberland published his memoirs in 1806–07. George Romney, whose talent Cumberland encouraged, painted his portrait, which is in the National Portrait Gallery.

== Works ==
Among his later comedies were:

- Calypso (1779)
- The Natural Son (1785), in which Major O'Flaherty who had already figured in The West-Indian, makes his reappearance
- The Country Attorney (1787)
- The Impostors (1789), a comedy of intrigue
- The School for Widows (1789)
- The Armourer (1793), originally Richard II but rewritten as The Armourer to pass censorship
- The Box-Lobby Challenge (1794), a protracted farce
- The Jew (1794), a drama, highly effective when the great German actor Theodor Döring played "Sheva"
- The Wheel of Fortune (1795), in which John Philip Kemble found a celebrated part in the misanthropist Penruddock, who cannot forget but learns to forgive (a character declared by August von Kotzebue to have been stolen from his Menschenhass und Reue), while Richard Suett played the comic lawyer Timothy Weazel
- The Dependent (1795)
- First Love (1795)
- The Last of the Family (1797)
- The Village Fete (1797)
- False Impressions (1797)
- A Word for Nature (1798)
- The Sailor's Daughter (1804)
- A Hint to Husbands (1806), which, unlike the, rest, is in blank verse.

The other works printed during his lifetime include:

- The Note of Hand (1774), a farce
- The Princess of Parma (1778)
- Songs for a musical comedy, The Widow of Delphi (1780)
- The Battle of Hastings (1778), a tragedy
- The Carmelite (1784), a romantic domestic drama in blank verse, in the style of John Home's Douglas, furnishing some effective scenes for Sarah Siddons and John Kemble as mother and son
- The Mysterious Husband (1783), a prose domestic drama
- The Days of Yore (1796), a drama
- The Clouds (1797)
- Joanna of Montfaucon (1800)
- The Jew of Mogadore (1808)

His posthumously printed plays (published in 2 vols. in 1813) include:

- The Walloons (comedy, acted in 1782)
- The Passive Husband (comedy, acted as A Word for Nature, 1798)
- The Eccentric Lover (comedy, acted 1798)
- Lovers' Resolutions (comedy, once acted in 1802)
- Confession, a quasi-historic drama
- Don Pedro (drama, acted 1796)
- Alcanor (tragedy, acted as The Arab, 1785)
- Torrendal (tragedy)
- The Sibyl, or The Elder Brutus (afterwards amalgamated with other plays on the subject into a very successful tragedy for Edmund Kean by Payne)
- Tiberius in Capreae (tragedy)
- The False Demetrius (tragedy on a theme which attracted Schiller)

=== Adaptations ===
- Aristophanes' Clouds (1798)
- William Shakespeare's Timon of Athens (1771)
- Philip Massinger's The Bondman and The Duke of Milan (both 1779).

=== Novels ===
- Arundel (1789)
- Henry (1795) – was printed in Ballantyne's Novelists' Library (1821),
- John de Lancaster (1809)

== Sources ==
- Critical Examination of Cumberland's works (1812) and a memoir of the author based on his autobiography, with some criticism, by William Mudford, appeared in 1812.
- George Paston's Little Memoirs of the Eighteenth Century (1901) includes an account of Cumberland.
- Hermann Theodor Hettner assessed Cumberland's position in the history of the English drama in Litteraturgesch. d. 18. Jahrhunderts (2nd ed., 1865), i. 520.
