= Richard Daly =

Irish actor and theatrical manager

Richard Daly (1758–1813) was an Irish actor and theatrical manager who, between 1786 and 1797, held the Royal patent for staging dramatic productions in Dublin and became such a dominant figure in Irish theatre that he was referred to as "King Daly".

== Birth and family background ==
Richard Daly was born in County Westmeath in 1758, the third son of Joseph and Frances (née Fetherston) Daly of Castle Daly, Kilcleagh, near Athlone. His family were descendants of Bryan O’Dailaigh who, at the time of his death in 1619, possessed the castle and demesne of Kilcleagh. Ownership of that property (later called Castle Daly) was confirmed to the family at the Restoration, and they converted to Protestantism during the Williamite confiscations. By the 19th century their estate exceeded 3,000 acres.

== Trinity College and the Middle Temple ==
Daly entered Trinity College, Dublin, at the age of fifteen and was a turbulent student. The playwright John O'Keeffe remembered him as "so given to riot and commotion that he was the terror of all public places". O'Keeffe was present when, at the head of a party of undergraduates, Daly forced his way through the stage-door of the Smock Alley Theatre, assaulted the doorkeepers, and rushed into the green room, causing the actress Jane Pope to be "greatly terrified".

The judge Sir Jonah Barrington, his contemporary at Trinity College, later recalled Daly's appetite for single combat. Before the pair had even spoken to one another, Daly sent Barrington a written challenge to a duel. Barrington, who had not previously fought, was somewhat intimidated on beholding his opponent's striking figure, turnout and distinctive squint when they met at Donnybrook – an encounter which ended without Daly discharging his gun, but saw him sustain minor injury when Barrington's shot was deflected. According to Barrington this was one of sixteen duels fought by Daly at Trinity in the space of two years, three with swords and thirteen with pistols. (Note: The Irish historian William John Fitzpatrick accused Barrington of "habitual exaggeration in story-telling" (see "The Sham Squire" and the Informers of 1798, 2nd Edn., M. H. Gill & Son Ltd., Dublin, 1869, Vol. II, p. 299) so this frequently quoted tally of Daly's duels may not be reliable. Daly's challenge to Barrington was the result of mistaken identity; realising it when they met, Daly apologised and begged to be excused, but Barrington's second (Richard Crosbie, the balloonist) insisted the duel proceed. Presenting his opponent with "a full front", Daly was struck by Barrington's shot but the ball glanced off his diamond brooch, leaving part of the brooch embedded in his chest.)

The circumstances in which Daly quit Trinity in 1776 and lived in London until 1779 are not clear. A claim that he fled Dublin after killing a billiard-table marker was among several allegations that prompted him to bring libel proceedings in 1789. More probable is the explanation that he left to pursue legal studies in London where he was admitted a student of the Middle Temple in November 1776. Jonah Barrington (who, like Daly, left Trinity without a degree) spoke of him as a fellow Templar, and there is later reference to his commencing practice at the English Bar but finding few clients. Other sources report a London meeting with the celebrated Irish actor Charles Macklin who encouraged Daly to seek his fortune on the stage, following which he made an anonymous debut in the role of Othello at Covent Garden in March 1779. His performance on that occasion is said to have been poorly received, but in the following month his benefit night was successful, and shortly afterwards he returned to Ireland in the company of Thomas and Ann Crawford who had also been playing at Covent Garden.

== Marriage and early career in theatre ==
He made his Dublin stage debut in May 1779 when, at the Crow Street Theatre, he appeared in the role of Lord Townly in The Provok'd Husband, playing opposite Mrs Crawford who had inherited the theatre from her previous husband, Spranger Barry.

Soon afterwards Daly married the "beautiful and fashionable" actress Jenny Barsanti, a daughter of the musician Francesco Barsanti. (Note: When Jenny arrived in Dublin, very full petticoats were generally worn there; she, however, had hers made scantier and turned the tide of local fashion in favour of what became known as "Barsanti petticoats": The Early Diary of Frances Burney, 1768–1778, ed. Anne Raine Ellis, Vol. I, George Bell & Sons, London, 1889, p. 183, n. Her physical appearance declined after her marriage to Daly: a visitor found the once "tall and slim, graceful and elegant" woman he remembered from Covent Garden had "become very bulky, her manners were plain and she seemed as if she had been a rustic matron who had never seen the metropolis. Her husband's attention to her seemed to invalidate all the unfavourable reports of the irritability of his nature": John Taylor, Records of My Life by the late John Taylor, Esq., Author of "Monsieur Tonson", J. & J. Harper, New York, 1833, p. 302.) She was the widow of John Richard Kirwan Lyster, who had died in January that year, and brought Daly both a stepdaughter (Lyster's posthumous child) and an annuity. She had made her stage debut at Covent Garden seven years earlier, had delivered the Epilogue when George Colman retired as manager there, and had been the original Lydia Languish in Sheridan's The Rivals. She possessed talent which her friend Frances Burney was "sure will in time raise her to the highest pitch of fame". (Note: Quoted by Skinner, An Unsullied Reputation, p. 3. Barsanti had been the "favourite pupil" of Burney’s father; Skinner suggests she may have been much in Burney's mind when writing her novel Evelina and is perhaps "an unspoken presence in the work" (ibid).)

Mrs Daly immediately devoted herself to instructing her new husband "in the mechanical and technical points of the dramatic art and succeeded in rendering him a respectable actor". The couple made their first stage appearance together in November 1779 as Beverly and Belinda in the Crow Street production of Arthur Murphy's All in the Wrong, and in the following February they played in George Farquhar's The Inconstant. In April 1780 they appeared in John Burgoyne's The Maid of the Oaks and Sheridan's The School for Scandal.

These productions were staged under the management of Thomas Ryder who, while leasing Crow Street from Ann Crawford, also occupied the Smock Alley Theatre. Although "esteemed the best hearing house in Europe", Smock Alley stood idle and was rented by Ryder simply to prevent it falling into a competitor's hands. In order to escape this double burden, Ryder elected to give up the Smock Alley tenancy when his landlord offered to release him from liability for rent arrears of £3,615 if he surrendered the premises. Unknown to Ryder, Daly had been in negotiation with the landlord and had agreed to assume responsibility for the arrears on being granted possession of the playhouse. By "stratagem and inducements" he then persuaded the best of Ryder's players to join him in a new company at Smock Alley.

== Manager of Smock Alley ==
=== Early success ===
Under Daly's management the redecorated Smock Alley Theatre opened in November 1780 with a prelude bearing the title "Smock Alley Secrets" (written by Rev. Peter Le Fanu, a fashionable Dublin clergyman) followed by Richard Cumberland's comedy The West Indian and Isaac Bickerstaffe's farce The Sultan, Daly and his wife playing in the first two of these. A week later they appeared in a production of The School for Scandal, in which Daly's performance was reckoned by the critic for the Hibernian Journal to be "all the Author intended or the Audience could wish. He is a most promising young Actor and receives the Applause his Merit justly Claims". In the following month the couple featured in the first Irish production of Hannah Cowley's The Belle's Stratagem, which had been the major success of that year's London theatre season and was staged by Daly "with magnificence not at all inferior to Covent Garden".

Daly's management of Smock Alley was quickly rewarded with commercial success: "he not only had the best company Ireland could then produce but engaged the principal London stars and got up the most celebrated pieces as soon as they were established in London". To increase interest in his productions he sometimes reversed gender in comedies and light opera, having men play female characters and vice versa – though when he cast his wife in male roles she refused to wear men's clothing.

Early members of his company included the actress Sarah Hitchcock and her husband Robert (the later historian of Irish theatre) who became prompter and afterward deputy manager at Smock Alley. Robert Hitchcock recruited others to the troupe and was instrumental in the engagement (at the "star" salary of £5 per week) of John Philip Kemble who, in 1781, made his first appearance for Daly in the role of Hamlet. When subsequently miscast as Sir George Touchwood in The Belle's Stratagem, Kemble's "negligent delivery and heaviness of deportment" resulted in Daly urging him to exert himself more; Kemble took offence and refused to continue in the part until Daly apologised. However, Kemble's "wonderful strength" in the title-role of Robert Jephson's The Count of Narbonne won much acclaim; in this he was supported by Daly in the character of Theodore, while "Miss Francis" (who was to become the celebrated Mrs Jordan) played the part of Adelaide. Jephson himself attended rehearsals; the play ran for thirty very profitable nights, and Daly was praised as a "rising theatrical genius".

Elizabeth Inchbald performed for Daly in 1782 and in the following January he brought Elizabeth Fitzhenry out of retirement to reprise six of her best-known portrayals "prior to taking her final leave of the stage". In February he travelled to London and engaged Sarah Siddons for a limited number of performances in the summer, when she duly appeared at Smock Alley alongside her brother John Kemble and sister Elizabeth Whitlock (whom the Dublin press dismissed as "Mrs Siddons's appendage"). The theatre was "crowded to suffocation" to see Siddons in the title role in Isabella (an adaptation by David Garrick of Thomas Southerne's The Fatal Marriage, in which she had been the sensation of Drury Lane's previous season), and she afterwards appeared as Belvidera in Thomas Otway's Venice Preserv'd, and as Jane Shore in Nicholas Rowe's tragedy of that name. Her engagement was sufficiently successful that Daly renewed it for the following season, for a reported fee of one thousand guineas. Also in 1784 he engaged John Henderson, Alexander Pope, Elizabeth Younge (the future Mrs Pope) and Joseph George Holman, and he had Kemble, Henderson, Pope and Holman play Hamlet on alternate nights in the same week.

=== First opera productions ===
In 1783 he began to intersperse the usual dramatic fare at Smock Alley with major operatic productions, Giusto Fernando Tenducci arranging and performing in Thomas Arne's Artaxerxes and William Bates's Pharnaces. In January 1784, Tenducci and Elizabeth Billington sang the title-roles in Christoph Gluck's Orpheus and Eurydice and, during their joint season, they received "uncommon bursts of applause from the most brilliant and crowded audiences that ever honoured a theatre". The musicians included Billington's husband on double-bass and were led by her brother, the violinist Charles Weichsel, and the scenery, "in a new style", was the work of the landscape painter Thomas Walmsley whose employment at the theatre "did infinite credit to Mr Daly's judgment". The scenery and costumes cost Daly £1,200 and the Hibernian Journal praised "the unsparing Liberality of a Manager whose only Avarice seems to centre in promoting public Gratification".

=== Development of relationship with Robert Jephson ===
In February 1783 Daly staged the first performance of Robert Houlton's comic opera The Contract, and in May that year and in January 1784, respectively, he presented the premieres of Robert Jephson's The Hotel, or the Servant with Two Masters and The Campaign, or Love in the East Indies. Jephson, apart from being a playwright, was a Member of the Irish House of Commons, Comptroller of the Lord Lieutenant's Household, and Master of the Horse in Ireland, and as such was a useful conduit for Daly to the administration at Dublin Castle. In addition to practising as a doctor, Robert Houlton was a columnist for Francis Higgins, publisher of The Freeman's Journal. The Journal was the unofficial organ of the Dublin government, for which Higgins became chief spymaster.

=== More musical success, and courting Charles Macklin ===
In 1785 Daly commissioned the composer Charles Dibdin to provide him with musical scores (Note: Dibdin recalled furnishing Daly with work "to the value of about six hundred pounds, for part of which I received a hundred and forty, with a promise that the remainder of the music should be returned, which promise was never fulfilled": Charles Dibdin, The Professional Life of Mr Dibdin, written by himself, London, 1803, Vol. I, p. 187.) and lured his old mentor Charles Macklin, then aged about eighty-six (but popularly believed to be much older), to play at Smock Alley by agreeing to pay him £50 per night. Such a rate was considerable by contemporary standards but the revenue a popular performer could generate may be judged from the death-bed confession to Daly by a ticket agent who, during the course of a brief engagement of Thomas King at Smock Alley, had succeeded with others in misappropriating £600 of Daly's ticket money.

Macklin's residence at Smock Alley did not go entirely to plan. During a rehearsal of his play The Man of the World, he delivered such harsh criticism of Daly's performance as Egerton Macsycophant that Daly resigned the role in favour of William Macready the Elder, whose triumph in the part brought new momentum to his career. Widespread delight at Macklin's own performance (his first in Dublin for ten years) prompted the Dublin Evening Post to declare that Daly "is honoured with a much larger share of public favour and patronage than any other manager in this kingdom ever experienced and is justly entitled to that universal encouragement which has so distinguished his management".

== Dominance and grant of Royal patent ==
The appeal and vitality of the offerings at Smock Alley resulted in rapid decline of audience numbers at Crow Street and in 1782, unable to pay his actors, Thomas Ryder withdrew from theatrical management and joined Daly's company of players. Thomas Crawford briefly struggled to keep Crow Street alive, but in 1783 Mrs Crawford sold her interest in the establishment to Daly in exchange for a lifetime annuity of £100 and an indemnity against certain liabilities, and she afterwards also performed at Smock Alley.

In 1781 Daly had bought leases of theatres in Cork and Limerick and somewhat later he took possession of those in Newry and Drogheda, all of which he fed with touring parties from his Dublin company. By 1785 he was negotiating a lease of Waterford Theatre and had control of the Opera House in Dublin's Capel Street which had briefly flourished under the direction of Tommaso Giordani. From 1785 onward Daly employed Giordani as his musical composer and John Moorehead to work under him.

The sovereign position Daly achieved in Irish theatre inspired references to him as "His Majesty of Smock Alley", "the Monarch" and "King Daly", and in November 1786 he was granted a Royal patent to stage theatrical performances in Dublin during the next fourteen years. The exclusive right to grant such patent had been vested in the Crown by the Dublin Stage Regulation Act of that year, which had been openly promoted in Daly's favour and cancelled the licensing authority previously exercised by Dublin's Lord Mayor. The patent also brought Daly appointment as Deputy Master of the Revels in Ireland. (Note: According to Sir John Gilbert (John Thomas Gilbert, A History of the City of Dublin, Vol. II, McGlashan and Gill, Dublin, 1859, p. 209) and other accounts, Daly was appointed Master of the Revels in Ireland, "from which he derived no greater emolument than being present in Court Costume at all levees of the Viceregal Court" (Commercial Journal and Family Herald, Dublin, 15 July 1854, p. 2). He has more often been described as Deputy Master, but his successor as patentee, Frederick Jones, was styled Master of the Revels during the period of his tenure (e.g., The British Press, London, 31 January 1807, p. 3). The office was listed for abolition in 1817: "Report of the Select Committee on Sinecures", The Scots Magazine, 1 April 1817, pp. 34–35.)

Daly's acquisition of the patent has been attributed to his favour with the Duke of Rutland. Appointed Viceroy of Ireland in 1784, the Duke had quickly attracted animosity by remarks he made when receiving a petition addressed to George III. He was hissed from every part of the house on entering Smock Alley Theatre for a command performance and was grateful for Daly's intervention on his behalf. The two are said to have become "intimate friends" but, while Rutland's influence may have been helpful, passage of the Stage Regulation Act required support from a wider constituency. (Note: Lady Morgan stated that Daly's "family interest" procured him the patent (Lady Morgan's Memoirs, p. 61), but there seems no evidence to support this.) Francis Higgins' network of connections may have been key in this respect, and in 1789 it was alleged that Daly and Higgins secretly shared the benefit of the patent.

== Transfer to Crow Street ==
At the end of 1787 Daly closed Smock Alley Theatre (which he sold in 1789) and relocated his Dublin operations to the Crow Street playhouse, on the refit of which between fifty and sixty men were employed daily and on which he spent upwards of £12,000. A new roof, at greater height, was constructed; this allowed a revised layout inspired by the arrangements at Covent Garden and Drury Lane and gave a light and airy quality to the whole house, throughout which the "utmost luxuriancy of taste" was displayed.

At the opening of the refurbished theatre (now called the Theatre Royal) on 18 January 1788, Daly delivered a Prologue, written for the occasion by the dramatist Joseph Atkinson, (Note: In developing his work for the stage Atkinson worked closely with Daly, to whom he dedicated the libretto of his comic opera A Match for a Widow, or The Frolicks of Fancy, published in 1788 (but written in original form in 1785).) declaiming,

Long have I wish'd this welcome hour to see – What exultation, and what pride to me!
'Midst all my struggles and expensive toil, To boast this station in my native soil….
On this last stake I risk myself – my all: A bold attempt – by which I rise – or fall.
Should I succeed – 'tis due to your applause; And if I fail – 'tis in the public's cause.

== Trials and tribulations ==
=== Rivalries ===
Among the seasoned actors who joined Daly when he established his own company at Smock Alley in 1780 was Robert Owenson. According to Owenson's daughter, the novelist Lady Morgan (at whose christening Daly was present), the pair entered into some form of partnership and Owenson acted as Daly's deputy. However, they soon quarrelled and, having terminated the partnership, Owenson took a 99-years lease of the Music Hall in Dublin's Fishamble Street. He reopened this as The City Theatre and staged his first production there in December 1784.

On Daly obtaining the Royal patent, Owenson sought to recover from him the investment rendered futile by loss of the City Theatre's licence. The claim was referred to arbitration, resulting in an agreement whereby Daly would pay Owenson £300 annually for ten years conditional upon no paid actor or actress performing at the City Theatre. Owenson afterwards engaged in the wine trade but also acted for Daly.

In 1788 Philip Astley was granted a patent under the Dublin Stage Regulation Act to stage performances of horsemanship, musical pieces, dancing, tumbling and pantomime but excluding tragedy, comedy, opera, plays and farce. Daly petitioned the Lord Chancellor to withhold the Great Seal from the grant, claiming that his own patent gave him a monopoly of performance-based entertainment in Dublin. The claim failed and, despite Daly securing rights over most of the vacant plots in the city that were large enough to accommodate a circus, Astley's Amphitheatre opened in Peter Street in January 1789.

=== Legal wrangles ===
Daly had himself diversified the fare at Smock Alley and Crow Street with occasional tableau presentations, rope-dancing and other acts in the circus tradition, and in 1784 he introduced dancing dogs (Signor Castelli's "Learned Dogs of Paris") to complete his evening's bill. The latter novelty reportedly "materially injured his popularity" and he was "greatly astonished" by the widespread pleasure and support which greeted the Amphitheatre's presentations. When these strayed beyond the terms of Astley's patent he successfully sued.

In 1788 he initiated proceedings against a Dublin lottery-office keeper who had failed to make payment on his winning tickets. This action seems to have kindled personal hostility towards Daly on the part of John Magee who was the publisher of the Dublin Evening Post and a lottery broker on a major scale. Magee was already at loggerheads with his rival in newsprint, Francis Higgins, and from June 1789 onwards he published accusations that Daly, Higgins and Robert Houlton had perpetrated a lottery "swindle" devised by an allegedly suicidal Daly to recoup his supposed gambling losses. (Note: The alleged "swindle" seems to have involved Houlton travelling to attend the English lottery draw in London and then releasing pigeons carrying the winning ticket numbers to Dublin where bets could be laid on the London outcome before news of it otherwise reached the city. See Greene, The Trials of Richard Daly and John Magee, pp. 142–145.)

Magee's allegations became increasingly extreme. They included claims that Daly had, while a student, murdered a billiard-table marker with the blow of a ball to the temple, and had recently "polluted the virtue" of the actress Harriet Esten. He also took to insulting members of Daly's company in print, declaring they were drawn from among "the cast-offs of Sadler's Wells, the refuse of Covent Garden and the outcasts of Drury Lane", and denouncing Andrew Cherry as "the lowest buffo of the stage". Such remarks were followed by outbreaks of riotous behaviour in the upper gallery of the Theatre Royal; these were suspected to be the work of Magee's hirelings and became an almost nightly occurrence.

Attendance at the theatre was adversely affected, partly due to public disapproval of Daly's alleged conduct and partly due to the risk of violence on the premises. Daly began to have difficulty recruiting and retaining players due to fears that Magee would smear their names and doubts as to Daly's continued solvency. Nevertheless, when he could field a strong cast, hundreds might be turned away from the theatre and ticket money could be eighty per cent of the revenue from an excellent night at Covent Garden.

Daly served a writ for libel on Magee in June 1789, claiming damages for injury to his reputation and business; he quantified his loss at £4,000 and obtained an order from Lord Clonmell, then Chief Justice of the King's Bench in Ireland (a close friend of Francis Higgins), requiring Magee to provide bail money in that amount. When Magee was unable to do so he was imprisoned. This triggered debate in the Irish House of Commons concerning the legality of requiring bail in defamation cases, an issue that was referred to a Grand Committee of the Courts of Justice where the Attorney-General frustrated its determination. The Whig Club, under the chairmanship of the Duke of Leinster, declared that if the order in Daly's case was properly made then "the liberty of the subject is in imminent danger". These events attracted considerable public attention and increased the prevailing unpopularity of the Irish administration.

Daly's claim for libel was tried in July 1790 when eleven barristers appeared to present his case, including John Philpot Curran, Henry Duquerry, John Egan and Jonas Greene. By this time he was seeking damages of £8,000 on account of further allegations made by Magee but, while his case succeeded, the jury awarded him only £200 in damages and sixpence towards his costs. An application, by Magee's brother, to have Magee declared a lunatic had been unsuccessful, but he was later made the subject of a lunacy order.

=== Imprisonment and scandal ===
Disturbances at the Theatre Royal did not cease with the outcome of the Magee case and when, in the autumn of 1791, Daly and his brother Cuthbert, a barrister, came to blows with an audience member, they were themselves convicted of aiding riot and assault. Daly was sentenced to six months' imprisonment (Cuthbert to twelve) and the Viceroy, Lord Westmorland, had to intervene to procure his release from Newgate.

While Daly was in prison there was published in London a lurid account of Elizabeth Billington's alleged adultery with him during her time at Smock Alley in early 1784, shortly after her marriage and when already pregnant. By 1792 Mrs Billington was the principal diva at Covent Garden and rumoured to have slept with a succession of Dukes and the Prince of Wales, and the publication created a minor sensation, selling out almost immediately. The Scots Magazine considered "the anecdotes of Messalina and Moll Flanders afford nothing more abominable that what we have here perused". Declaring her "greatest abhorrence and detestation" of what was alleged against her, Billington issued libel proceedings but these bore no fruit and the allegations soon reappeared in a publication that suggested other improprieties by Daly "who dies for every lady he brings forward".

At the time reports of his alleged adultery with Billington first surfaced in print, Daly was suing her for £250 on a wager made during her engagement for The Beggar's Opera, which he had staged in the previous summer when her celebrity was already so considerable that "at an early hour the avenues to the theatre were crowded in a manner only equalled on Mr Garrick quitting the stage". Although Dublin may have derived temporary titillation from the account of Billington's off-stage activities, by 1805 that account was dismissed as the work of "some needy scribbler" and "justly consigned to oblivion". (Note: James Ridgway, publisher of the Billington letters, was a political pamphleteer who worked in occasional association with H. D. Symonds. The pair found a rich seam to mine in the reading public’s appetite for detail of the sexual peccadilloes of conspicuous individuals, Ridgway declaring that "It is now generally agreed that public performers, whose morals are flagitious, are the proper objects of general censure" (Mrs Billington's Memoirs, Prefatory Address, p. xv). Symonds was the original publisher of The Secret History of the Green Room (London, 1793), later issues of which, portraying Daly as a sexual predator, appeared while Ridgway and Symonds were imprisoned for seditious libel. Ridgway's Memoirs of Mrs Billington was followed by publication of An Answer to the Memoirs of Mrs Billington. With the Life and Adventures of Richard Daly Esq. and an Account of the Present State of the Irish Theatre, written by a gentleman well acquainted with several curious anecdotes of all parties, London, 1792. This latter portrayed Billington as a victim of Daly's licentiousness in a setting where his apartment in the theatre was "a brothel in the morning" and "a gambling rendezvous in the evening": Susan Levin, "Vice, Ugly Vice: Memoirs of Mrs Billington from her Birth", in Romantic Biography in England (ed. Eugene Stelzig), Ashgate Publishing Ltd, Farnham, 2009, p. 55.)

== Later career ==
=== Absence from performing ===
The Magee case caused Daly such "agitation of his mind as prevented him from attending his business", and neither he nor his wife appeared on the stage between June 1789 and January 1793. During the early part of the Dalys' absence from the stage Margaret Kennedy, Frances Abington, William Thomas Lewis, Charles Incledon, Rosemond Mountain, Frances Hodgkinson, Georgina George and Maria Ann Campion were among those whom Daly engaged, followed by Maria Bland, Elizabeth Farren, Charlotte Wattell, Charlotte Melmoth, Michael Kelly, Anna Maria Crouch, Tryphosa Jane Wallis, Gertrud Elisabeth Mara, John Henry Johnstone, Mary Ann Davenport, Laurence Clinch and Joseph Munden. (Note: For a full listing of actors and actresses who appeared for Daly, see Professor John C. Greene's Theatre in Dublin, 1745–1820, A History, in six volumes, Lehigh University Press, 2012.)

In order to compete with Astley's presentations, Daly increasingly diversified the Theatre Royal's repertoire, introducing elaborate ballets, (Note: These were staged "almost nightly" from 1791 (Greene, Theatre in Dublin, Vol. 4, p. 2671), the performers being Luigi Bartolomichi (later of Drury Lane, killed in London while resisting arrest for debt in 1800: Sun, 1 April 1800) and the del Caro sisters (for whom see Highfill, Vol. 4, pp. 291–2). One of the del Caros "captivated Dublin by her dancing of the hornpipe, to which she gave her name"; the tune to which she performed the dance was published as Del Caro's Hornpipe in 1797.) pure spectacles (such as "Gallic Freedom", depicting the storming of the Bastille) and a variety of novelty items. Particular interest was captured by the Chevalier d'Eon's display of his or her (the audience was uncertain but fascinated on the point) fencing skills.

In some quarters these developments were, like Daly's earlier presentations of "dancing dogs and whistling men", deemed to "trample on the ornaments of drama", and in 1793 a group of wealthy young men leased Robert Owenson's City Theatre and fitted it up to "a degree of elegance hitherto unknown in Ireland". Amateur productions were staged there under the management of the Earl of Westmeath and Frederick Edward Jones and were glowingly reported in the pages of the Hibernian Journal. When professional actresses were engaged to play alongside the amateurs, Daly treated his annuity obligation to Owenson as discharged and Owenson lost the ensuing litigation.

=== Return, and difficulties ===
In January 1793 Saunders's News-Letter was at last able to "congratulate the lovers of the drama, on the return of their two greatest favourites, Mr and Mrs Daly, to that station in the theatric world, which they supported with such superior ability". Of the couple's appearance at the Theatre Royal, it claimed, "Never did any dramatic event accord more with the wishes of the public". Less than a fortnight later the same publication was lauding Richard Daly's performance in Benjamin Hoadly's The Suspicious Husband, and in early February, in reference to the couple's playing Mr and Mrs Oakley in George Colman the Elder's The Jealous Wife, it reported that "Mr and Mrs Daly are peculiarly capital". (Note: Daly's Oakley was "acknowledged to be the best on the stage", according to Saunders's News-Letter, 8 July 1795, p. 2.)

In 1794 Jones procured a licence authorising dramatic performances on the Fishamble Street premises provided no male actors were paid to perform and admission was limited to membership of the organising group. This element of exclusivity stimulated a demand for membership which left the boxes of the Theatre Royal "quite deserted, it being deemed vulgar to be seen in them". By 1795 the theatre was, according to George Frederick Cooke, "at a low ebb; the performers were ill paid, and the house, scenes and dresses were very mean".

In early 1795 Daly's wife (who had last performed in the previous February) was terminally ill. Daly, who was "extravagantly fond" of her, broke down on stage when performing during her illness. She died in April, "endowed with every virtue that could grace the female breast… her death a brilliant example of Christian fortitude". In the same year Frederick Jones applied to the Lord Lieutenant, Earl Camden, for a full patent for staging theatrical entertainment; the application was accompanied by a memorial, signed by many of Dublin's fashionable figures, criticising both Daly's playbills and premises. Ordered to investigate the criticisms, the Irish Attorney-General judged them valid, and Camden intimated to Daly that he proposed to grant Jones a concurrent patent.

=== Retirement ===
Daly declared he would prefer to retire on fair remuneration rather than engage in what he believed would be ruinous competition and, with effect from 12 August 1797, he transferred his theatrical undertaking and the Crow Street premises to Jones in exchange for an annuity of £800 for his own life and thereafter of £400 for the joint lives of some of his children. At the same time Jones relieved Daly from responsibility for an annual payment of £232 assumed when acquiring Smock Alley, and agreed to give him an annual profit rent of £300 on the theatres in Cork and Limerick. With effect from November 1797 Daly was also granted an Irish Civil List pension of £100 per annum for the life of the survivor of his four daughters.

The Dublin Evening Post reported that Daly "has quitted the Dramatic Throne while in the plenitude of power and fullness of public encouragement". The timing of his retirement was well chosen, being promptly followed by the Irish Rebellion of 1798. (Note: Daly probably foresaw the disorders that lay ahead. In July 1797 Archibald Maclaren sent him a farce which Daly called him to Dublin to discuss but dared not stage because it touched on the United Irishmen's plans for rebellion. David Erskine, Isaac Reed and Stephen Jones, Biographia Dramatica: or A Companion to the Playhouse, Longman Hurst, London, 1812, Vol. I, Part II, p. 476; What News from Bantry Bay; or, The Faithful Irishman, A Comic Opera, by Archibald M'Laren… To which is added A Copy of Mr Daly's Letter, Thomas Burnside, Dublin, 1798.) Jones was granted a new theatrical patent for twenty-one years, but no sooner had he refurbished and reopened Crow Street than martial law was proclaimed, prohibiting citizens from appearing on the streets after 8 p.m. Jones's application for compensation failed to find sufficient support in Parliament, and further disturbances resulted in his theatre again being closed in 1803.

For "reasons of economy" Daly removed to the Isle of Man, where he built "an elegant mansion" and found himself a neighbour of Thomas "Jerusalem" Whaley, an Irish MP and notorious gambler. Whaley's brother-in-law was John Fitzgibbon who, as Irish Attorney-General, had validated the complaints concerning Daly's management of the Theatre Royal. (Note: Whaley was "on terms of close intimacy with Francis Higgins and Lord Clonmell, and the three were frequently to be seen disporting themselves on the Beaux Walk in [St] Stephen's Green" (Sir Edward Sullivan, Buck Whaley's Memoirs including his Journey to Jerusalem, Alexander Moring Ltd., London, 1906, Preface, p. xv). He and Daly may therefore have known one another for some years.) In 1799, an altercation took place between Daly and Whaley, arising from which Whaley preferred charges against Daly. On appearing in court Daly used "intemperate expressions" and was sentenced to a month's imprisonment for contempt. The balance of his years seem to have passed quietly.

== Reputation ==
Surviving accounts of Richard Daly's qualities and conduct vary to a remarkable degree.

=== As actor ===
Throughout his years in theatre, the range and quality of Daly's skills as a player were enthusiastically applauded in the Dublin press. However, fairly soon after his retirement and in an otherwise sympathetic account of his career, the Thespian Dictionary or Dramatic Biography of the Present Age declared that his acting in tragedy was "contemptible" and in light comedy only "tolerable". This assessment may have come from the pen of W. C. Oulton, (Note: Thomas Gilliland ascribed the anonymous Thespian Dictionary to Oulton: Theatrical Inquisitor or Monthly Mirror, C. Chapple, 1816, Vol. IX, p. 248. Gilliland is likely to have had particular insight on the point because he absorbed considerable portions of the Thespian Dictionary into his own Dramatic Mirror of 1808.) who would have seen Daly in action on many occasions. It was adopted by later commentators, yet was at odds with the opinion of others such as John O'Keeffe, who was familiar with the work of all the leading players of the period and remembered Daly as "an accomplished actor". Nevertheless, contemporary reservations about his ability in melodrama are evident from Sir Martin Archer Shee's remark after seeing his performance in Frederick Reynolds' dramatisation of The Sorrows of Young Werther: "Daly, though many degrees removed from excellence is, in my opinion, passable and much better than you would expect" (italics added). (Note: Shee had visited the theatre four nights each week when he made this remark in December 1786; he probably attended the first night of Werther when, in the opinion of one critic, Daly did "every justice" to his character "and displayed new powers of the pathetic in his style of acting", attracting the warmest applause: Saunders's News-Letter, 4 December 1786, p. 2.)

His reputation as an actor may have suffered from his judgements as a manager and director. He attracted criticism for casting himself "in the foremost part in every play" and was said to "pique himself on his talent as a prologue speaker both as regards deportment and delivery". Mrs Siddons complained of his inclination to occupy the front of stage rather than a position best suited to the scene, and he was accused of insisting his costume should outshine all others in comedy productions. (Note: John Bernard recalled Daly had a favourite pink suit in which he played all his genteel comedy characters; when about to appear with him in Know Your Own Mind, Bernard arrived in a suit of similar colour which Daly insisted on his changing before going on stage: Bernard, Vol. I, pp. 231–233. Michael Kelly gives an example of Daly's insistence on the superior quality of his costume in Reminiscences of Michael Kelly of the King's Theatre and Theatre Royal, Drury Lane, 2nd Edition, Vol. 2, Henry Colburn, London, 1826, p. 51.)

=== As manager ===
The Thespian Dictionary acknowledged that, in management, Daly achieved greater success than any of his Dublin predecessors Thomas Sheridan, Spranger Barry, Henry Mossop, Henry Woodward and Thomas Ryder, all of whom had failed financially. Joseph Atkinson declared Daly rescued Dublin theatre from "neglect and degradation" and brought it to "the highest pitch of magnificence and respectability"; the same was said by Robert Hitchcock, but neither was an entirely disinterested party and their opinions predate the overall decline of Daly's offering during the 1790s.

His "spirit" as a manager was widely praised, but his treatment of members of his company was described as "oppressive and tyrannical". The theatre historian Thomas Gilliland mentioned Charles Mathews as one who "suffered every misery under the management of Mr Daly", although Mathews' own contemporary account was less hostile. On joining the company in June 1794, he reported finding that Daly "is hated by all his performers scarcely any of whom can get any money from him" and "bears the worst of characters", but by July he considered such character was undeserved, and in August he rejoiced in his "very pleasant" situation and confirmed he had "not been fined a farthing". (Note: In later years Mathews gave a less generous account of Daly who, he wrote in 1828, "cared not who wanted so that his eminence feasted": Caledonian Mercury, 2 July 1835. Mathews's widow made her own attack on Daly's "cruelty-system" whereby his performers went unpaid while "he himself indulged in every luxury": Mathews, Vol. II, p. 131.)

The latter reference alluded to Daly's practice of fining members of his company for breaches of house discipline. In 1791–94 he employed a comic actor named Moss at a generous weekly rate that he reduced by allegedly arbitrary fines which Moss sued to recover "every week". Daly's pursuit of players to recover penalties due when they failed to honour the duration of their contracts has also been cited as an aspect of his "tyranny". (Note: Notable among the instances of his implementing the forfeiture provisions of articles of engagement were the cases of Mrs Jordan and Mrs Billington. When Billington decamped to Capel Street and the Rotunda in breach of her 1782 articles, she quickly settled her liability: Memoirs of Mrs Billington, p. 67. In 1788, when she failed to honour her engagement to perform on eight nights for £500, she paid Daly that sum, boxes for her performances already having been sold for £600: Bath Chronicle, 2 October 1788, p. 3.) However, his conduct on such occasions was not uniform: in 1794 he declined to pursue George Frederick Cooke for breach of his articles (Charles Mathews observing "he would not distress him for the world") and, when in 1788 Mary Wells appealed for release from her contract on account of domestic difficulties, Daly responded by tearing up the document in her presence.

The quality of his relationship with his leading players varied: while Mrs Siddons complained he "adopted every means of vexation for me that he could possibly devise", (Note: When Siddons was later engaged by Frederick Jones she "became involved in quarrels and disputes of precisely the same character as she had with Daly": Fitzpatrick, The Kembles, Vol. II, p. 32.) Mrs Abington credited him with every endeavour "to make her situation in the theatre as agreeable as could possibly result from the most friendly and polite attention". Several players took space in Dublin newspapers or directly addressed audiences from the stage to vent complaints about their treatment by Daly. Their grievances sometimes grew from not being cast in the parts to which they aspired and, in Daly's defence, the Thespian Dictionary posited that occasional slander was the penalty every manager paid for "resisting the whims and caprices of his company". Where events led to a breakdown in relationship, there are instances of Daly taking pains to repair it. (Note: An example is John Bernard's recollection that, when he was in straitened circumstances after they had parted "in mutual disgust", Daly stopped him and requested their quarrels be forgotten, saying "we ought to have been better friends and brother actors" and offering to lend him twenty guineas: Bernard, Vol. I, pp. 302–303.) James Grant Raymond, a man of "excellent private character", was a player in Daly's company (Note: Raymond was the biographer of the poet Thomas Dermody who, while assisting a scenery-painter at Crow Street, composed lines comparing Daly and Philip Astley "in which the feats of the latter were humorously and satirically enlarged upon". Robert Owenson was so impressed by the piece that he effectively adopted the young Dermody: John George Raymond, The Life of Thomas Dermody, William Miller, London, 1806, Vol. I, pp. 58–69.) and afterwards for Frederick Jones before himself becoming manager at Drury Lane. He spoke of Daly's relationship with him during the 1790s "in the highest terms".

If W. C. Oulton was indeed their author, two of the observations in the Thespian Dictionary may hold particular relevance when assessing Daly's management record. (Note: Until 1786 Oulton was a Dublin resident and sought to have his dramatic works performed locally; as a frequent visitor to the city's theatres he would have been familiar with their politics and personalities.) "If Mr Daly's conduct could not always be defended," wrote his biographer, "it was not always justly represented", adding that "theatrical enmity is well known to proceed from secret jealousy and theatrical friendship from secret interest".

=== As duellist and dissolute ===
Daly's reputation for duelling was magnified after his death. Described in 1866 as a "professed duellist" by "a dramatic writer of eminence", in 1908 he became a "professional duellist" under the pen of the historian W. J. Lawrence, the latter translating the suit in which the teenage Daly faced Jonah Barrington into his "regulation attire" for combat. (Note: Lawrence cited Barrington's description of the attire in which he first met him: "a pea-green coat, a large tucker with a diamond brooch stuck in it, a three cocked hat with a gold buttonloop and tassels and silk stockings" (Barrington, p. 299).) Clare Jerrold (wife of Walter Jerrold) augmented but contradicted Barrington's recollection when, in her biography of Dorothea Jordan, she declared Daly was "a member of the Fire-eaters' Club", perhaps encouraging subsequent descriptions of Daly as a "frequent and ferocious" duellist. Although duelling was a fashionable resort in contemporary Irish society, evidence of Daly engaging in it in adulthood is sparse. (Note: Daly and John Kemble reportedly met to duel following an insult by the intoxicated Kemble, but their encounter was frustrated by the Dublin sheriffs' officers and the pair were soon reconciled: Greene, Theatre in Dublin, Vol. 3, pp. 2357–2358. John Magee’s succession of allegations against Daly included a claim that he and a captain of marines engaged to fight but "the affair terminated in so peaceable a manner that the parties were seen walking arm and arm and smelling to one nosegay": Dublin Evening Post, 25 August 1789, p. 3. Daly was said to have declined a challenge by Elizabeth Billington's husband (George Raymond, Memoirs of Robert William Elliston, Comedian, John Mortimer, London 1844, p. 425) and had his own challenge rejected by Thomas Whaley (Hereford Journal, 14 August 1799, p. 4). Otherwise the cupboard seems bare. In 1789 the editor of The Freeman's Journal declared that Daly "has never intentionally done injury to man or mortal" (quoted in Madden, Vol II, p. 474).)

Daly's affair with Dorothea Jordan in 1782 seems to be the first recorded among the several carnal connections he is reputed to have had with his actresses. It is not apparent when that affair became widely known, but by January 1787 it was, though long spent, regarded as sufficiently substantial a relationship to justify inclusion of coupled portraits of "Mrs Tomboy" (Jordan, as Priscilla Tomboy in Bickerstaffe's The Romp) and "The Irish Manager" (Daly) in a series of engravings of celebrated lovers published in the Town and Country Magazine. (Note: As early as 1792 the Hibernian Magazine referred to Mrs Jordan having formed "an improper connection" in Ireland, "the fruits of which became visible and a variety of reasons pressed her immediate departure" (Walker's Hibernian Magazine, 1792 (2), p. 166). Suggestions that Daly was responsible for the pregnancy did not appear in print for another decade and, even thirty years later, a popular publication of theatrical gossip was "not prepared to say" he was the father of Jordan's child although he, Jordan and the child were by then all dead (Oxberry's Dramatic Biography, Vol. I, No. XII, 9 March 1825, p. 202). The former actor J. D. Herbert recalled his own chaste friendship with Dorothy Jordan at Smock Alley and the great interest taken in her by Mrs Daly, who "gave her all the professional advice she required". Herbert made no suggestion of undue closeness between Jordan and Daly himself, attributing her departure from Dublin to Daly's insistence on bringing in leading players from London and her concern that this injured her own career prospects. Herbert wrote his memoir without reading published biographies of Jordan "lest I should be induced to deviate from what I witnessed myself": J. D. Herbert, Irish Varieties, for the Last Fifty Years: written from recollections, William Joy, London, 1836, pp. 8–14.)

The purported letters of Elizabeth Billington confess she "made a cuckold of her husband by committing adultery with Mr Daly", and soon after their publication The Secret History of the Green Room alleged that Daly had physically forced himself upon an unwilling Mrs Jordan and had lusted for Miss Romanzini (later the wife of Mrs Jordan's brother George Bland). (Note: The allegation that Daly had, in effect, raped Jordan reappeared in the "Memoir of Mrs Jordan" in Oxberry's Dramatic Biography and Histrionic Anecdotes, Vol. I (George Virtue, London, 1826, p. 65) and was there presented as "another version" of what passed between the two, although it had not been part of that Memoir when printed in issue No. XII of Vol. I of Oxberry's Dramatic Biography (pp. 197–205) of 19 March 1825.) Allegations also emerged of Daly romancing Mrs Baddeley and Miss Tweedale, and propositioning Mrs Inchbald and Mrs Siddons. Some of the allegations seem based on slight or ambiguous foundation, (Note: "The true extent of [Daly's] supposed philandering and brutishness remains suppositious": Greene, The Trials of Richard Daly and John Magee, p. 136, n. 2. Supposition of his brutishness seems largely to derive from his reputation as a duellist and reference to him as a "ruffian" (initiated by Magee in 1789 and emphasised by Jerrold, p. 46, a century later), and conflicts with characterisations of him by John O'Keeffe ("a man of great humanity and a zealous friend": O'Keeffe, Vol. II, p. 43), Archer Shee ("a very polite agreeable man and very elegant in his manner": Shee, Vol. I, p. 61), or Charles and Mrs Mathews ("a very feeling man"; one who "never allowed himself to appear on unpopular occasions. His manners were refined and fascinating and he preferred being cruel by deputy": Mathews, Vol. I, pp. 144, 146).) but their cumulative effect provides support for the application to Daly by Oxberry's Dramatic Biography of the general assertion that "Managers are, in their theatres, little better than Turks in their seraglios; at least as far as the indigence or immorality of their female performers will allow them to be so".

In tandem with misconduct towards his players, Daly has been said to be "preoccupied with drinking and gambling" but, when alluding to his gambling, Clare Jerrold referred to it taking place during "his constant attendance at a Temperance Club where the only refreshment allowed was biscuits and water". In his suit against Magee, Daly took particular exception to the suggestion that he was a gambler, protesting this to be "false, scandalous and malicious", though there was later attributed to him "an extraordinary propensity for making wagers in reference to incidental matters, however unimportant". He has been credited with invention of the word "quiz" in consequence of one such wager. (Note: Origination of the word "quiz" was credited to him as early as 1835, when several British newspapers carried an account of the random letters q-u-i-z being chalked on Dublin's walls in furtherance of Daly's wager that a word of no meaning could be on the lips of the city's inhabitants within twenty-four hours of its invention (see, for example, St James's Chronicle, 20 January 1835, p. 3). This account was repeated in a dictionary of 1836 (B. H. Smart, Walker Remodelled: A New Critical Pronouncing Dictionary of the English Language, T. Cadell, London, 1836, p. 507) and enlarged forty years later by Frank Thorpe Porter who specifically dated its invention to 21 August 1791 when, at the fall of the Smock Alley curtain, Daly gave each of the theatre's call boys and scene-shifters "a card and a piece of chalk and directed them to perambulate the city until daybreak, chalking the word on the doors and shutters of the houses" (Frank Thorpe Parker, Gleanings and Reminiscences, Hodges, Foster & Co., Dublin, 1875, pp. 32–35). The word had actually been coined earlier, appearing in a letter of Frances Burney's believed to date from 1782 (The Early Diary of Frances Burney, Vol. II, p. 297), but seems to have been part of the spoken currency of theatrical circles in Daly's time. His friend John O'Keeffe named an "oddbody" character Quiz in Patrick in Prussia, or Love in A Camp, first performed at Covent Garden and Smock Alley in 1786 (Saunders's News-Letter, 22 May 1786), and wrote comedic parts for John Edwin. In 1789, at the Haymarket theatre, Edwin sang an air which seems to echo in the 1835 newspaper accounts: the air refers to the word Quiz giving way to a new invention "Quoz", so that "if you walk about the town, each time you turn your head" the letters q-u-o-z will stare at you from "people's shutters" (Bury and Norwich Post, 23 September 1788, p. 4). Philip Astley staged a pantomime The Quiz at his Dublin Amphitheatre in 1792 (Dublin Evening Post, 24 November 1792, p. 3).)

== Death and family ==
Daly died in Dublin's Lower Gardiner Street on 8 September 1813. By his wife he had numerous sons and daughters. One of his sons, a lieutenant in the Royal Navy, died in 1811 commanding a gun-boat which, when bombarding enemy positions near Cádiz, exploded after a red hot shell penetrated its magazine. Daly's reputed daughter by Dorothea Jordan, Frances Alsop, took to the stage and died in America in 1821. His stepdaughter, Jane Lyster (the child of Mrs Daly's first marriage), married William Jameson, KC, and was mother of William Jameson of Fort Lyster, President of the Royal College of Surgeons in Ireland in 1861.

By 1821, following expiry of his patent, Frederick Edward Jones had paid more than £25,500 to Daly and his family pursuant to the arrangements agreed at the time of Daly's retirement. Payments under his Civil List pension were still being made in 1828.
