= John Magee (journalist) =

Irish journalist and lottery broker

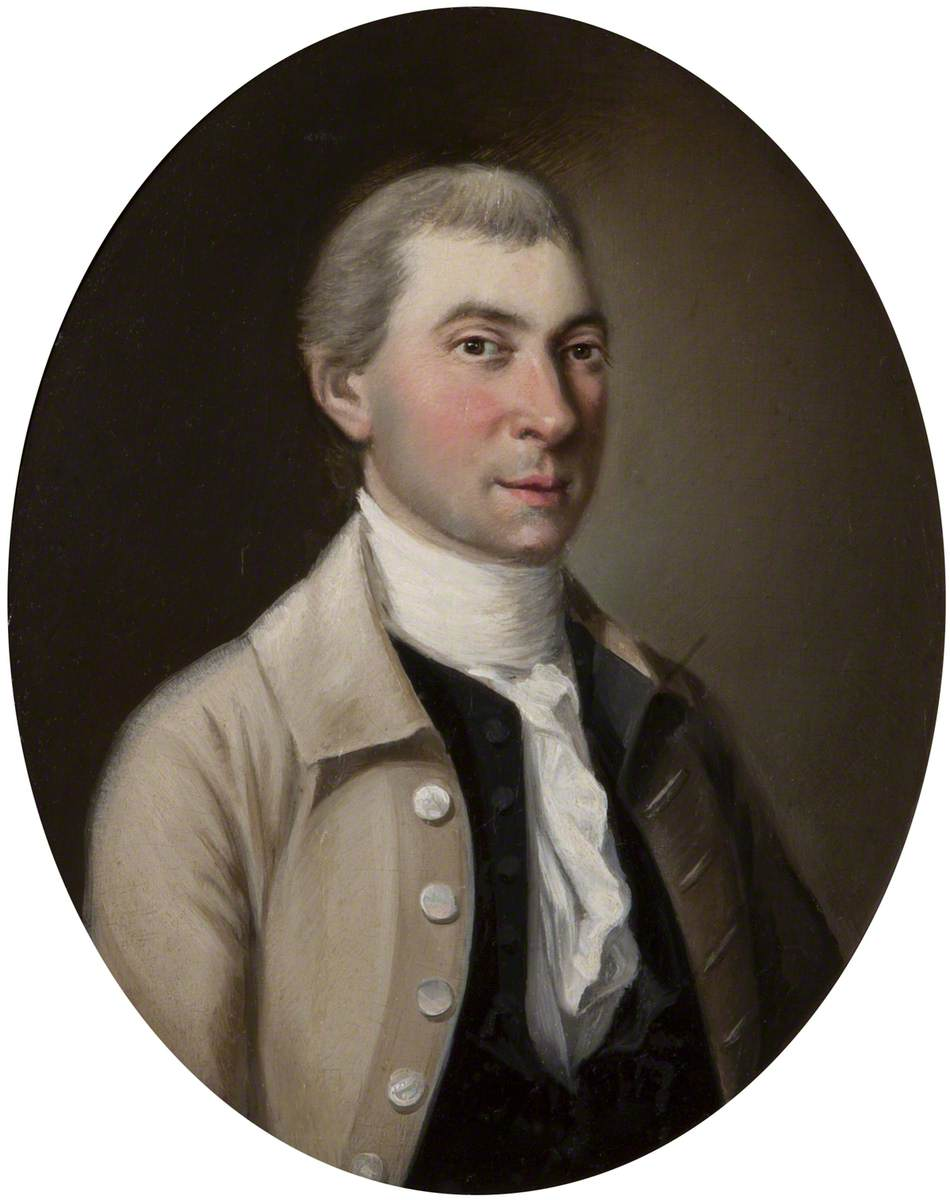
- Died: November 1809
- Occupations: Journalist and lottery broker

John Magee (died November 1809) was an Irish journalist and lottery broker.

== Biography ==
Magee became proprietor and printer in Dublin of ‘Magee's Weekly Packet’ in 1777, and of the ‘Dublin Evening Post’ at the beginning of 1779. Both papers were printed at 20 Dame Street. From the first these journals, and especially the ‘Evening Post,’ opposed the government measures, and showed whig sympathies, but during 1789 the proprietor's name became particularly prominent on account of a series of attacks made on the notorious Francis Higgins, a journalist in the government pay, and on other persons, among whom was John Scott, Lord Earlsfort, afterwards Earl of Clonmell, chief justice of the king's bench, Higgins's personal friend. Magee also charged Richard Daly, patentee and manager of the Crow Street Theatre, with tricking the former patentee out of his patent and with making money, in conjunction with Higgins, by dishonest means. Reflections on the character of Thomas Brennan, at that time on the staff of the ‘Freeman's Journal,’ but formerly a writer in Magee's own employ, and on a lady named Tracey, who was a ward of Higgins, and then lived with her aunt in Brennan's house at Kilmacud, appeared at the same time in the ‘Dublin Evening Post.’ On the affidavits of these persons fiats were issued by Lord Earlsfort in June requiring Magee to find bail to the amount of 7,800l., pending actions for libel. This he was unable to do, especially as it was requisite that the sureties should declare themselves worth twice the amount of the bail. He was consequently confined in a spunging-house. He continued while in confinement to conduct his newspapers, and Nicholas Lawless, first lord Cloncurry, sought to alleviate the hardships of his imprisonment.

On 3 July 1789 the trial of Magee for the libel on Higgins began before Lord Earlsfort. Magee was not present at the opening, a habeas corpus having been refused, and he was unrepresented by counsel. An order to bring up the body of defendant was, however, at length granted by the chief justice; but Magee, when he arrived, protested against the empanelling of the jury and the opening of the trial in his absence, and, refusing to plead, was at his own request ordered back into custody. No defence was offered. But Arthur Browne and other lawyers in court protested against the excessive fiats as unconstitutional (Browne, Arguments before King's Bench on admitting John Magee to Common Bail, 1790). Magee's charges were in popular opinion well founded. The jury at first brought in a verdict of ‘guilty of printing and publishing,’ but were sent back by the chief justice, and then returned a general verdict of guilty. Lord Earlsfort, who refused them a copy of the record, declared that ‘had they given any other verdict they would have acted in a manner shameful to themselves and disgraceful to their country.’ No good report of the trial is in existence. On his conviction he was set at liberty pending the pronouncement of his sentence. On 10 July 1789 the Dublin Volunteers passed a resolution approving ‘the firm conduct of our worthy fellow-citizen in a late transaction,’ and Hamilton Rowan wrote to Magee in his confinement offering to subscribe twenty-five guineas to a public subscription which it was proposed to raise in his behalf. Magee, however, refused to accept anything. On 30 July, Brennan, one of the men libelled by Magee, entered Magee's house and destroyed the furniture. He was arrested and tried on sworn information, but was acquitted.

Meanwhile, Magee continued to lampoon Higgins and Lord Clonmell, and the ‘Freeman's Journal,’ which belonged to Higgins, replied with equal scurrility. To revenge himself upon the lord chief justice he arranged for Lammas day, in honour of the Prince of Wales's birthday, what he called a ‘Bra Pleasura’ in a field adjoining Lord Clonmell's house at Dunleary, or ‘Fiat Hill.’ Lord Cloncurry was an eye-witness, and an account is also given by Sir Jonah Barrington. A mob of several thousands assembled. A derisive programme of sports was performed. Dogs danced in barristers' uniforms, and asses raced with jockeys in wigs; and finally, in an ‘Olympic pig-hunt,’ the people followed the animals into Lord Clonmell's grounds and did much damage. The ‘Dublin Evening Post’ of 25 August announced an adjournment of further proceedings to 7 Sept., pending the arrival of the chief justice. On 27 August it declared that ‘there would be thirty thousand men at Dunleary.’ The chief justice, according to an informant of Fitzpatrick, in great alarm implored the viceroy to summon the privy council and obtain a suspension of the Habeas Corpus Act. The result was that Magee was arrested on 3 September by a warrant of Sir Samuel Bradstreet, judge of the king's bench, and, being unable to give heavy bail to keep the peace for five years, was committed to Newgate. On 29 October he was liberated in bail for 4,000l. On 3 October a petition to grant a commission of lunacy in the case of Magee was dismissed by the lord chancellor of Ireland, who said ‘he had observed Mr. Magee the whole time he had been in court, and he saw nothing insane in him.’ In its issue of 31 October the ‘Dublin Evening Post’ stated that ‘in the argument preparatory to Mr. Magee's liberation from his cruel and oppressive imprisonment the king's attorney-general avowed in open court that Magee's persecutions were entirely a government business.’

A further period of imprisonment in Newgate between 5 and 27 November followed, owing to some difficulty respecting his bail, and on 2 December he was again committed on the warrant of 3 September. On 8 February 1790 he was sentenced to six months' imprisonment and a fine of 50l. for another offence—contempt of court in commenting on the proceedings in the court of king's bench.

The proceedings against Magee had now become a matter of public interest, and both Lord Clonmell and the administration generally of George N. T. Grenville, first marquis of Buckingham, had incurred great odium in consequence. The question of the legality of the fiats was brought before the Irish House of Commons on 3 March by Ponsonby. A resolution to the effect that they were unconstitutional was moved by the latter before the grand committee of courts of justice, but the government motion that the chairman leave the chair was carried by 125 to 91. Ponsonby's speech was subsequently published. An ‘Address to the Whig Club on the Judicial Discretion of Judges on Fiats and Bails,’ published anonymously, was written by Leonard McNally (Madden, Hist. of Irish Period. Lit. ii. 349). The practice of issuing fiats was afterwards limited to definite sums.

The case of Daly v. Magee came on for hearing on 28 June 1790. Curran was among the prosecuting counsel, and Ponsonby one of those for the defence. The damages claimed were 8,000l.; those given were 200l. and 6d. costs.

By the beginning of 1790 Magee was broken both in fortune and in spirit, and his attacks on Higgins and his friends ceased. Though himself brought to the verge of ruin, he had accomplished his ends. Higgins was removed from the commission of the peace in 1793, and afterwards struck off the rolls. Through his representations, too, the city magistrates took active steps in September 1789 against the Dublin gambling-houses, which he had charged Higgins with supporting. Lord Clonmell's reputation Magee had also permanently ruined. Magee, whose residence was at 41 College Green, died in November 1809.

John Magee (fl. 1814), his eldest son, carried on the ‘Dublin Evening Post’ for several years on the same lines as his father. He was on 21 February 1812 found guilty of publishing a libel on the Dublin police (Ann. Reg. 1812, pp. 271–2), and on 27 July 1813 he was convicted of a libel on the Duke of Richmond (late lord-lieutenant), and sentenced on 29 November to a fine of 500l. and two years' imprisonment, and to give securities to keep the peace for seven years. His defence, conducted by Daniel O'Connell in a speech of three and three-quarter hours, is generally considered to have been O'Connell's finest forensic display. This and the other speeches at the trial were published with a preface in 1813 under the title ‘Trial of John Magee,’ &c. (see also Ann. Reg. 1813, pp. 269–274; Select Speeches of O'Connell. On 3 February 1814, John Magee, junior, was again convicted of libel, he having published in his paper certain resolutions of the Roman Catholics of Kilkenny. He was sentenced on 4 Aug. to a fine of 1,000l. and imprisonment for six months, to commence from the expiration of his former term (Gent. Mag. 1814, i. 189).

James Magee (d. 1866), a younger son, was brought up as a merchant, but (probably in 1815) began to conduct the ‘Dublin Evening Post.’ The line he took was so conciliatory to the government that he appears to have been refunded part of the money paid in fines by his brother. In December 1815 he obtained from Nicholas Purcell O'Gorman damages to the amount of 977l. 13s. 10d. with costs, the latter having induced him to publish an incorrect account of a trial—O'Dogherty v. O'Mullan and others—on account of which Magee had had to pay 500l. damages (Trial of an Action for Deceit, Dublin, 1816). James Magee, who became a Dublin police-magistrate, died in September 1866 (Fitzpatrick, Ireland before the Union, p. 148).
