= John Lennergan Owens =

Irish actor

- Born: Ireland
- Occupation: Actor

John Lennergan Owens (fl. 1780) was an Irish actor.

== Biography ==
Owens was born in Ireland, to which country his performances seem to have been confined. He succeeded Henry Mossop at Smock Alley theatre, and was held as Zanga in the 'Revenge' to have approached more nearly than any other actor of the time to his original. All that survives concerning him is a reputation for persistent inebriety. Coming on the stage as Polydore in the 'Orphan,' he was hissed for obvious intoxication. Advancing to the front of the stage, he delivered with a scowl the following words in his soliloquy, 'Here I'm alone and fit for mischief,' and put himself in a fighting attitude. This Hibernian form of apology served the desired end, and Owens was allowed to finish his performance. His failing gradually drove him from the stage. On seeing John Kemble announced for Zanga, he begged some money of a stranger, who asked him his name. To this inquiry he answered with tragic solemnity, 'Have six years' cruel absence extinguished majesty so far that nought shines here to tell you I'm the real Zanga? Yes, sir, John Lennergan Owens, successor to Henry Mossop.' The dates of his birth and death are unknown.
