= Francis Magan =

Francis Magan (24 May 1774 – 1843) was a barrister and the informer who procured the death of Lord Edward Fitzgerald through felon-setting.

== Early life ==
He was born on 24 May 1774 in Dublin, descended from an ancient Catholic family from County Westmeath, the Magans of Umma-more (Emoe). His grandfather, James Magan, established a medical practice in Dublin, where he was succeeded by his eldest son, Richard. Thomas Magan, James's second son, became a woollen draper, establishing himself at 49 High Street, Dublin. Active politically, Thomas represented Dundalk at the Catholic Convention of 1792. He was named wool draper and mercer to King George III in 1794, an honorary title he probably owed to his friend Francis Higgins, a notorious scoundrel known as the "Sham Squire", owner of a well-known government "print" (newspaper), The Freeman's Journal.

Magan was admitted to Trinity College, Dublin in 1788, although he did not attend before 1791. He joined the College Historical Society but was never active. In May 1794, he signed the oath of loyalty to the British monarch required of any Catholic barrister and went to London to study at Lincoln's Inn.

== Career ==
Returning to Dublin in 1796, he was admitted to the Irish Bar, the King's Inns, in Michelmas term. The published records of the King's Inns state that he had been employed in the Irish revenue service.

Magan's historical notoriety originates from a single act. During April–May 1798 he informed the British government several times of the whereabouts of Lord Edward Fitzgerald on Thomas Street, Dublin, just as the latter prepared to take the field at the head of thousands of Croppies during the 1798 Rising. Lord Edward's arrest on 19 May deprived the United Irishmen of their most charismatic leader, on whose head the British had put a price of £1,000, equivalent to £1.5m in 2015.

Magan passed this to the Castle without being discovered or even suspected during his lifetime, probably because of his otherwise unremarkable life. He had found out Lord Edward's whereabouts through his involvement with the United Irishmen, being a member of its committee responsible for Dublin. He hosted a meeting of this committee on the night of 17 May 1798. Lord Edward attended and may have passed the night in Magan's house. Magan sold this information on to Dublin Castle the next day, provoking Major Sirr with a body of soldiers to apprehend Lord Edward as he departed from the rear of 20 Usher's Island at dusk. Given further information by Magan, Sirr found Lord Edward suffering from fever in 153 Thomas Street and shot him during a struggle, and he died in Newgate Prison, Dublin, some days later.

It was only with the publication of W. J. Fitzpatrick's Secret Service Under Pitt a century later in 1892 that Magan was unveiled as the traitor. Francis Higgins was paid the £1,000 for betraying Lord Edward, and Magan got £300 a year.

A fortune bequeathed by one Francis Magan led to the foundation of St. Vincent's Hospital, Fairview, Dublin in 1857.
