= William Gorman =

William or Bill Gorman may refer to:

- William Gorman (politician) (1891–1964), English barrister, judge and politician
- William Gorman (priest) (1826–1916), Anglican priest
- William Henry Gorman (1843–1915), co-founder of the Citizens Bank of Maryland
- Bill Gorman (footballer, born 1894), (1894-?) English footballer, see List of Bury F.C. players (25–99 appearances)
- W. M. Gorman (William Moore Gorman, 1923–2003), Irish economist and academic
- Bill Gorman (footballer) (1911–1978), Irish footballer
- Bill Gorman (politician) (1920–2009), American politician
