= Robert Hitchcock (dramatist) =

Robert Hitchcock (died 1809) was a British actor and dramatist. From 1781 he was resident in Dublin, along with his family who also acted, and he wrote a history of the Irish stage.

== Life ==
Hitchcock and his wife Sarah were members of the company at the Theatre Royal, Norwich from 1769. They moved in 1771 to York, where they were members of Tate Wilkinson's company at York Theatre Royal. From 1777 they were at George Colman the Elder's Haymarket Theatre, where he was prompter, while his wife and daughter Mary Anne both acted; during the winter seasons they continued to appear at York. Hitchcock was the model for the prompter in George Colman the Elder's play The Manager in Distress (1780).

In 1781 the family moved to Dublin, and appeared at Smock Alley Theatre. Richard Daly, owner of the theatre, opened in 1788 Crow Street Theatre as the Theatre Royal in Dublin, and the Hitchcock family moved there. Hitchcock was prompter, while his wife and daughter became great favourites on the Irish stage.

Hitchcock died in 1809 in Clarendon Street, Dublin. His daughter Mary Anne retired from the stage on her marriage to a Dublin barrister, Jonas Greene. His son Robert, an actor in his youth, graduated LL. B. at the university of Dublin, and became a member of the Irish bar.

== Works ==
Hitchcock was the author of:

1. The Macaroni, a comedy (1773), performed at York, and once at the Haymarket.
2. The Coquette; or the Mistakes of the Heart; a comedy (1777), acted at York and Hull. The plot is taken from Eliza Haywood's novel The History of Miss Betsy Thoughtless.
3. An Historical View of the Irish Stage, from the earliest period down to 1788, 2 volumes (1788, 1794).
