= Nicolina =

Nicolina may refer to:

== People ==
- Nicolina Giordani (c.1740 – after 1775), an Italian opera singer
- Nicolina Pernheim (born 1991), a Swedish Paralympic judoka
- Nicolina Vaz de Assis (1874–1941), a Brazilian sculptor
- Nicolina Bozzo, Canadian singer, participant on American Idol season 20 known by her first name.

== Places ==
- Nicolina (river), a tributary of the Bahlui in the city Iași, Romania
- Nicolina, a neighbourhood in Iași, Romania
  - Nicolina railway station, in Iași, Romania
