= Thomas Ryder (actor) =

British actor and theatre manager

Thomas Ryder (1735–1790) was a British actor and theatre manager, associated with the Smock Alley Theatre in Dublin. As a player, he was considered at his best in low comedy.

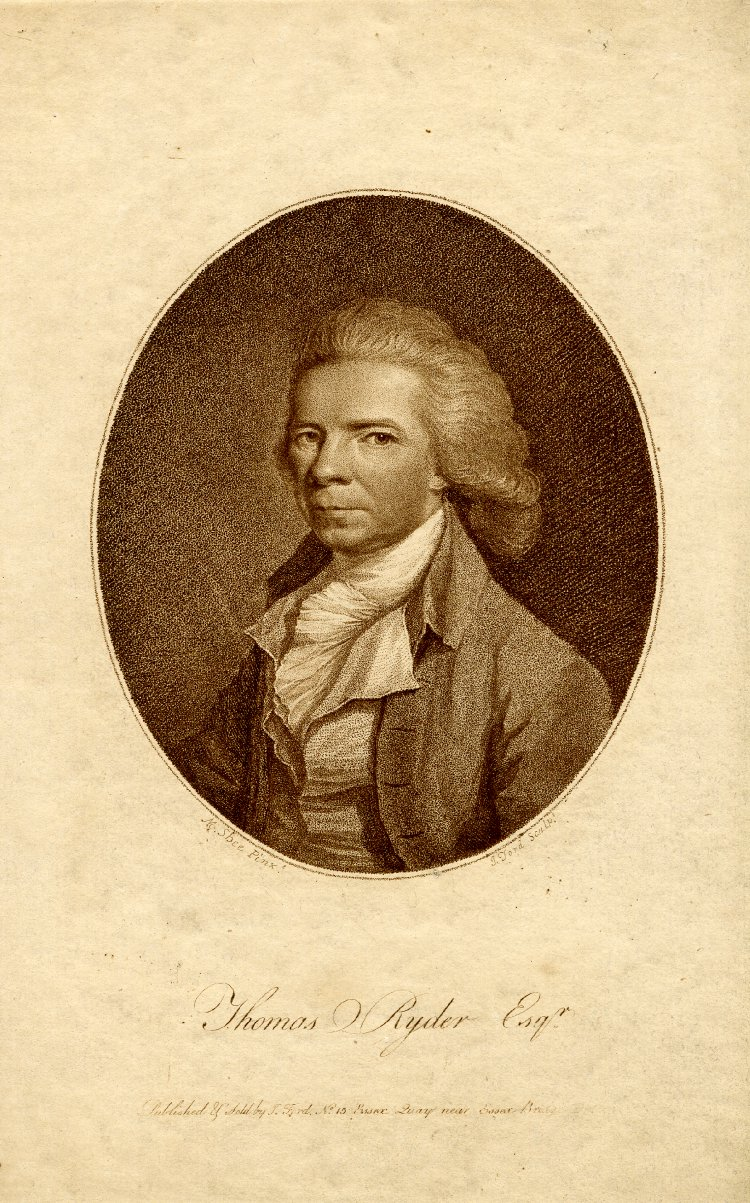
Thomas Ryder

== Early life ==
The son of the actor-manager Preswick Ryder (died 1771) and his actress wife Sarah, he was perhaps born in Nottinghamshire. He had early stage experience in Scotland, at least.

== The Dublin stage ==
Ryder appeared on 7 December 1757 at Smock Alley Theatre, Dublin, then under the management of Thomas Sheridan, playing Captain Plume in The Recruiting Officer to the Captain Brazen of Samuel Foote. He came to immediate favour. After the failure of Sheridan, Ryder remained under his successor, Brown, supporting Frances Abington as Sir Harry in High Life Below Stairs (James Townley) and in other parts. Under Henry Mossop, he played at the same house

For five years Ryder then ran a company, working his way around Ireland. He reopened at Smock Alley Theatre as Sir John Restless in All in the Wrong (Arthur Murphy), and temporarily brought back prosperity to the management. During the slack season Ryder performed at Ranelagh Gardens (Dublin).

== Manager at Smock Alley Theatre ==
In the autumn of 1772, Mossop having retired ruined, Ryder stepped into the management of Smock Alley Theatre, and opened in September with She Would and She Would Not, in which he played for the first time Trappanti. He was then declared to be the most general actor living for tragedy, comedy, opera, and farce.

Ryder remained in management in Dublin, helped by a lottery prize in the early days, with varying but diminishing success, until 1782. When the Fishamble Street Theatre started to take his business, he had the words of The Duenna taken down in shorthand, producing it as The Governess. A legal action ensued, but failed. He kept a carriage, and a country house known as "Ryder's Folly" which he sold unfinished. He also started as printer, editing plays in which he appeared, printing them and publishing a tri-weekly theatrical paper.

After trying in vain to manage Crow Street Theatre as well Smock Alley, Ryder yielded up Crow Street to Richard Daly, resigning management in 1782, and becoming a member of Daly's company.

== The London stage ==
On 25 October 1787, at Covent Garden as Sir John Brute in The Provoked Wife, Ryder made his first appearance in England. His début was not a conspicuous success, and a rival, John Edwin the elder, was the sitting tenant of many of his best parts. During his first season he repeated, however, many favourite characters. At Covent Garden, with one summer visit to the Haymarket, he remained until his death. The main original parts he played at Covent Garden were: Carty in O'Keeffe's Tantarara Rogues All on 1 March 1768; Duke Murcia in Elizabeth Inchbald's Child of Nature on 28 November; and Hector in O'Keeffe's Pharo Table, on 4 April 1789.

== Death ==
On 19 November 1790 Ryder played Old Groveby in the Maid of the Oaks. A week later (26 November 1790) he died at Sandymount, Dublin, and was buried in the churchyard of Drumcondra.

== Works ==
Ryder was responsible for two plays: Like Master Like Man, a farce, Dublin, 1770; this was a reduction to two acts of John Vanbrugh's The Mistake, itself derived from Le Dépit Amoureux; Samuel Reddish, who played it at Drury Lane on 12 April 1768, and it was revived at Drury Lane on 30 March 1773. His second piece, Such Things have been, a two-act comedy taken from Isaac Jackman's Man of Parts, was played by Ryder for his benefit at Covent Garden on 31 March 1789, and was printed.

== Family ==
Ryder married before the season of 1771–2, when Mrs. Ryder was seen as Clementina, Constance in King John, Lady Macbeth, and other characters. Two daughters were for a short time on the stage at Covent Garden, appearing respectively, Miss Ryder as Estifania and Miss R. Ryder as Leonora to their father's Leon in Rule a Wife and have a Wife, on 16 April 1790. Ryder's son, who was in the army, was killed in 1796 in a duel.

== Notes ==
Attribution

This article incorporates text from a publication now in the public domain: Lee, Sidney, ed. (1897). "Ryder, Thomas (1735-1790)". Dictionary of National Biography. Vol. 50. London: Smith, Elder & Co.
