= Robert Houlton =

English medical practitioner, dramatist, and journalist

Robert Houlton (c.1739–1815) was an English medical practitioner, dramatist and journalist.

== Early life ==
Born about 1739, he was the son of the Rev. Robert Houlton of Milton, Clevedon, Somerset. On 24 July 1755 he matriculated at Corpus Christi College, Oxford; then in 1757 he was chosen as a demy of Magdalen College. He graduated B.A. on 27 April 1759, M.A. on 21 April 1762. He resigned his demyship in 1765, and shortly afterwards married.

== The Suttonian method of variolation ==
Robert Houlton the elder was put on a salary to promote the Suttonian method of variolation (inoculation against smallpox), by Daniel Sutton, son of the method's inventor Robert Sutton. He was employed to preach to patients in a chapel Sutton had built in 1766 at Ingatestone in Essex, where he had moved from Suffolk after breaking with his father. In 1767 Houlton published a sermon on The Practice of Inoculation justified.

Robert Houlton the younger, admitted to the method's secrets, then went to Ireland to practice inoculation. In his pamphlet of 1768 he lists over 60 "partners" in the method, typically for an assigned area. He himself was party in Dublin to an agreement on use of the Suttonian method, with two surgeons, Charles Blake of Bath and Samuel Sparrow of Cavan, and Charles Meares acting as agent. Sparrow and Houlton made inoculation tours of a number of Irish counties. In 1770 Houlton was admitted to an ad eundem degree of M.A. in Trinity College, Dublin, and was subsequently admitted M.B. James Boaden wrote that he had an Edinburgh medical degree, and was a "weak man".

== Writer in Dublin ==
Houlton fell back on journalism and then dramatic writing. In political writing he used a number of pseudonyms. He was taken on the staff of the Freeman's Journal by Francis Higgins, in the 1780s. He also wrote in 1782 for John Magee's Dublin Evening Post, at the nationalist end of the spectrum, as the Freeman's Journal spoke for the British administration. In 1789 he admitted he had used the pseudonym "Hampden Alter" in attacks in the Dublin Evening Post on Henry Grattan, stating also that he was not employed by Magee after 1783.

For the Dublin operatic stage Houlton wrote libretti: as the poet put it in the Dublin Evening Post, "humdrum Houlton tunes his wooden lyre". They were:

- The Contract 1783;
- Double Stratagem, 1784 (adapted from The Contract);
- Gibraltar, 1784;
- Orpheus and Eurydice, 1784; and
- Calypso, 1785.

For a season Houlton shared the honours at the Capel Street Theatre for new work performed, with Walley Chamberlain Oulton. He met and supported the young runaway in 1785, Thomas Dermody, but ultimately left him to fend for himself. Houlton contributed to James Grant Raymond's 1806 Life of Dermody.

== Later life ==
In the spring of 1792 Houlton went to London, and was appointed editor of the Morning Herald. Poor health meant he resigned this post in about year, and after a long period of illness he was committed to the Fleet prison for debt in 1795. In January 1796 Martin Joseph Routh, president of Magdalen College, sent him assistance in answer to an appeal. He wrote verse: a dramatic prologue; an ode for Vauxhall Gardens, on George III's escape from the assassin James Hadfield. Some of his songs and ballads for Vauxhall became popular; his Blithsome Cherry was sung there by Maria Theresa Bland, to music by Samuel Arnold.

Houlton, according to Boaden, was an admirer of Isaac John Bickerstaff and the "innocent opera". With James Hook writing the music, he brought out at Drury Lane on 21 October 1800 a comic opera, called Wilmore Castle. It closed after five nights. Houlton took work with lottery promoters. At the end of his life, in 1815, he was applying to the Royal Literary Fund for support.

== Works ==
Houlton published:

- Indisputable Facts relative to the Suttonian Art of Inoculation, with Observations on its Discovery, Progress, &c., Dublin, 1768. This pro-Suttonian pamphlet casts some doubt on the claim (by Daniel Sutton) that he broke with his father in 1763.
- A Selection of Political Letters, Dublin, 1782.
- A Review of the Musical Drama of the Theatre Royal, Drury Lane, for... 1797–1800, which will tend to... elucidate Mrs. Plowden's late... publication, London, 1801. This work defended Wilmore Castle, which according to Houlton was the target of a concerted attack. Virginia, an opera by Frances Plowden, was withdrawn in 1801 at Drury Lane after Michael Kelly had arranged to have it hissed off.

== Notes ==
Attribution

This article incorporates text from a publication now in the public domain: Lee, Sidney, ed. (1891). "Houlton, Robert". Dictionary of National Biography. Vol. 27. London: Smith, Elder & Co.
