= Frances Alsop =

English actress

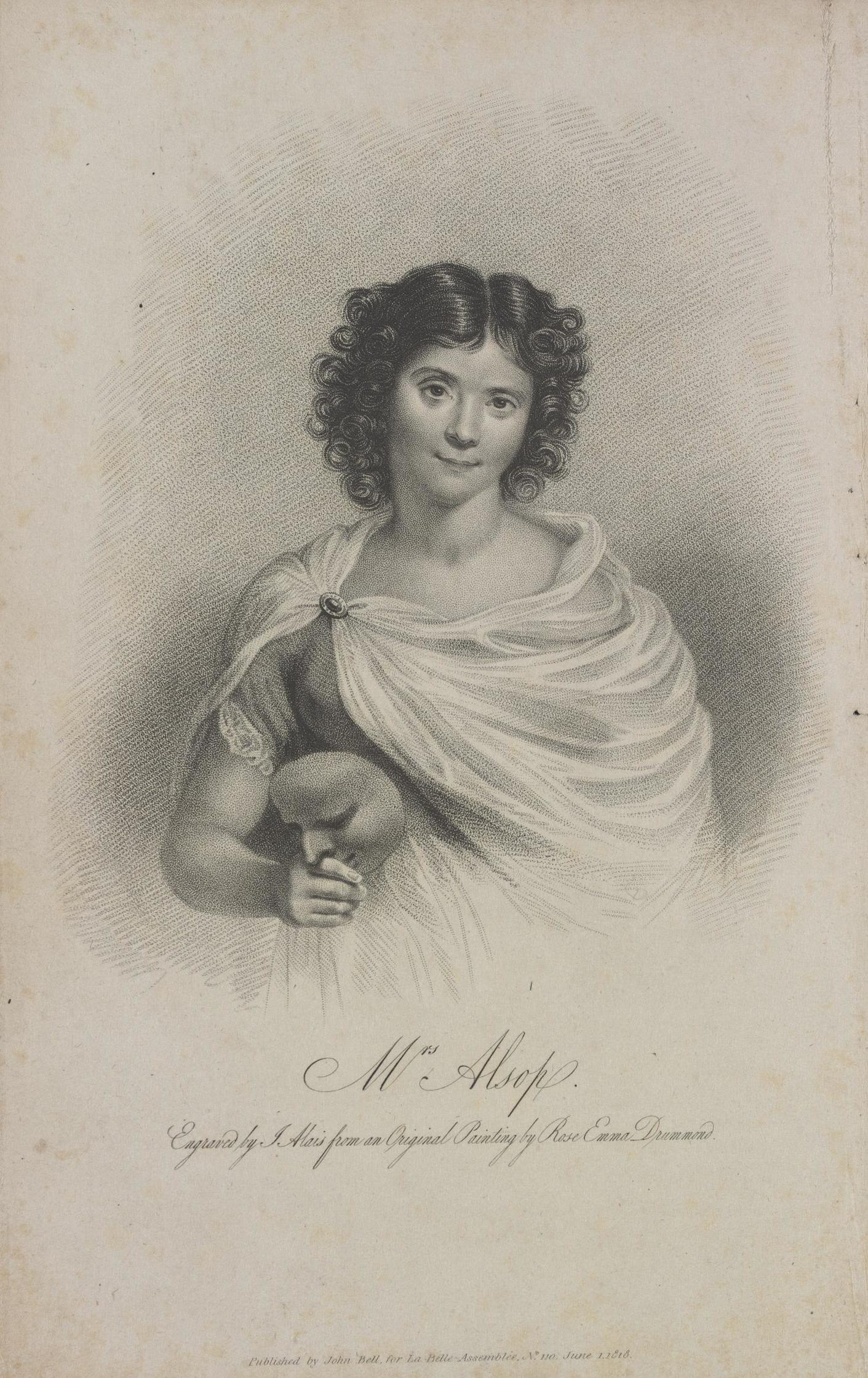
- Print portraying Mrs. Frances Alsop, engraved by Alais from an original painting by Rose Emma Drummond, published in London on 1 June 1818 by John Bell, for La Belle Assemblee.
- Born: Frances Daly; 1 September 1782
- Died: 2 June 1821 (aged 38); New York City, U.S.
- Other name: Frances Bettesworth
- Spouse: Thomas Alsop (m. 1807)
- Parents: Richard Daly (father); Dorothea Jordan (mother)

Frances Alsop (née Daly; 1 September 1782 – 2 June 1821) was an English actress. She was the illegitimate child of Richard Daly (1758–1813), manager of the Smock Alley Theatre, Dublin, and the actress Dorothea Jordan née Bland (1761–1816).

== Life ==
Frances was born and raised in England, where her mother – adopting the stage name "Mrs Jordan" – had continued her stage career, which by 1786 led her to be part of London's Drury Lane theatre company. By 1790 Dorothea Jordan was the mistress of the Duke of Clarence (later King William IV).

Frances's story begins in earnest in 1803 at her coming-of-age, when she was settled at her own home in Golden Square, London, all paid for by her mother. In 1806 Frances had changed her name to Frances Bettesworth, in order to receive a financial bequest from an elderly and wealthy gentleman of that name; a deal negotiated by her mother. On 1 August 1807 Frances married Thomas Alsop at St James's Church, Piccadilly, London. He was a clerk of the delivery of small arms in the Ordnance Office.

It seems likely that Frances and Thomas expected a dowry of £10,000, from her mother's connection with the Duke of Clarence, and she and Alsop took up residence at no 11 Park Place (Mayfair). While the precise facts of Frances's dowry are unknown, the marriage was fraught with financial difficulties often caused by Alsop, and debts were usually met by Mrs Jordan. The couple eventually separated, with Alsop having passage arranged to the East Indies, where he died.

It was not until 18 October 1815 that (as Mrs Alsop) Frances first took to the stage, at Covent Garden, in the role of Rosalind in Shakespeare's As You Like It and she was well received. She made her debut at the Drury Lane theatre in January 1817 with equal success, as Donna Violenta in The Wonder (1714) by Susanna Centlivre.

It seems from most of the newspaper reports of her acting that she rarely escaped comparison – generally favourable – with her mother; mention is also made of her skill as a musician (harp and guitar) and the attractiveness of her singing voice. Despite her initial success newspaper reports also show that year on year her roles steadily declined in number, and she increasingly made appearances in provincial theatres from Edinburgh to Exeter.

Her finances seem always to have been shaky, especially after her mother's death in 1816. In 1820 the king paid off her debts for the last time, and she left London for New York, where she found work as an actress, billed – somewhat erroneously – as the granddaughter of the late King of England. She died there from an overdose of laudanum on 2 June 1821.

The news was reported succinctly in the London press:

DEATH of MRS. ALSOP. -- We are sorry to learn,
says the Advocate, that Mrs. Alsop, the celebrated actress, died
suddenly yesterday morning. Her death is attributed to taking
too much laudanum by mistake; she had been sick for several
days previous to this unfortunate occurrence. --New York Paper.
