= Michele de Falco =

Italian composer

Michele de Falco (also Falco, di Falco, Farco: c. 1688 in Naples – after 1732) was an Italian composer, maestro di cappella, and a pioneer of the opera buffa genre. He was probably a student of Nicola Fago, with whom he also collaborated on his second opera. He also collaborated with Leonardo Vinci on his operas.

== Operas ==
- Lo Lollo pisciaportelle (Libretto: Nicola Orilia), opera buffa 1709
- I rivali generosi (Libretto: Apostolo Zeno), opera buffa 1712
- Nicola Fago: Lo Masillo (Libretto: Nicola Orilia), 2nd act by Falco, opera buffa 1712
- Lo 'mbruoglio d'ammore (Libretto: Aniello Piscopo), opera buffa 1717
- Armida abbandonata (Libretto: it:Francesco Silvani), Dramma per musica, 1719
- Lo castiello sacchejato (Libretto: Francesco Oliva), Commedia per musica, 1720 (1722 with additions by Leonardo Vinci, as pasticcio with Pietro Pulli 1732)
- Le pazzie d'ammore (under the anagram "Cola Melfiche," Libretto: Francesco Antonio Tullio), opera buffa 1723
- an intermezzo to the dramma per musica by Nicola Porpora Il Siface, 1726
