= Frederick Edward Jones =

Irish theatre manager

Frederick Edward Jones (1759–1834) was an Irish theatre manager.

== Life ==
Born at Vesington, County Meath in Ireland, he was educated at Trinity College, Dublin. He associate of people of rank on a continental tour. With Lord Westmeath he leased the Music Hall in Fishamble Street, Dublin, and opened it, 6 March 1793, with productions of Beggar's Opera and The Irish Girl, with amateur casts. He himself played Sir Lucius O'Trigger in The Rivals—there is no evidence that he himself was a professional actor.

In 1794 Jones obtained permission to open a theatre for seven years in Dublin, and to hire female but not male performers. He was, however, prohibited from taking money at the doors. His aristocratic patrons asked him to apply in 1796 to the Earl of Camden for a patent for a theatre. In the end he leased quite expensively Crow Street Theatre from the manager Richard Daly. Supported by Lord Westmeath, Jones spent heavily on the house, with the interior decorated by Gaetano Marinari and Zaffarini. The new house was opened, but after a few weeks was closed in after the proclamation of martial law and the Irish Rebellion of 1798.

Two years later a new patent was granted to Jones, who brought in Thomas Ludford Bellamy as stage manager. He spent further sums, but had again, for political reasons, to close in 1803. In 1807 Richard Brinsley Sheridan invited Jones to purchase a share in the Drury Lane Theatre, and to manage the house on a salary and percentage of profits: the scheme was defeated by the fire that burned down Drury Lane, 24 February 1809. Jones sold in 1808 shares in the Crow Street Theatre to John Crampton and Edward Tuite Dalton. Crampton undertook the management, but fared badly, and Jones had to resume the reins within six months. He once more withdrew from the management in 1814: a series of disturbances had culminated in a riot, in which the theatre was wrecked, and Jones laid the blame on the Tory government.

After Jones resumed management, further riots occurred in 1819. Intrigue against him proved successful, he was unable to renew the patent were refused, and it was granted to Thomas Harris of Covent Garden Theatre. Jones lost a large sum of money, and was imprisoned for debt. He died in retirement in 1834. A patent for a second theatre in Dublin was granted in 1829 to his sons, Richard Talbot Jones and Charles Horatio Jones.

Jones was known as "Buck Jones". A member of Daly's, the most aristocratic club in Ireland, he lived in style in a house in Fortick's Grove, rechristened by its old name Clonliffe House. Familiar Epistles to Frederick Jones, Esq., on the present State of the Irish Stage, Dublin, 1804, which was attributed to John Wilson Croker, criticised some of Jones's actors, but had less to say about him.

== Notes ==
Attribution

This article incorporates text from a publication now in the public domain: Lee, Sidney, ed. (1892). "Jones, Frederick Edward". Dictionary of National Biography. Vol. 30. London: Smith, Elder & Co.
