= Tommaso Giordani =

Italian composer (c. 1730 – 1806)

Tommaso Giordani (c. 1730 to 1733 – before 24 February 1806) was an Italian composer active in England and particularly in Ireland.

== Life ==
Giordani was born in Naples between 1730 and 1733 and came from a musical family. His father was Giuseppe Giordani senior, born around 1695 in Naples, and died after 1762, probably in London (no relation to the Neapolitan organist Carmine Giordani, b. 1685). A possible younger brother was Giuseppe Giordani (1751–1798), called "Giordanello". Tommaso was trained in Naples and moved with his father and siblings (including singer Nicolina) via Graz (1747), Salzburg and Frankfurt (1750), Amsterdam (1752) and Paris (1753) to London, where they performed four burlettas at Covent Garden in the 1753–54 season. Although the family performed in London for the next two years, Tommaso is not mentioned in the newspaper reports of the time. However in British publications of his time, Giordani was often referred to as "Tomaso Giordani", with a single "m" in his first name, or more commonly as "Sig. Giordani" or "Signor Giordani".

His whereabouts in the following eight years are unknown. In 1764, he accepted an invitation to act as musical director of the Smock Alley Theatre, Dublin, where he stayed for the next three years, performing comic operas and co-producing the first ever opera seria to be performed in Ireland, L'eroe cinese (1766). Following accusations of plagiarism, he went back to London in 1767, where for the next 16 years he was relatively successful as an opera composer. There he led productions of his own operas and pastiche operas with music by several composers at the King's Theatre, Haymarket.

In 1783, Giordani returned to live in Ireland for the remainder of his life. He was particularly active in opera, as both composer and impresario. He had a stake in the short-lived 'English Opera House', which he founded in 1783 and which produced works by Irish composers and librettists, also in a music shop, neither of which was financially successful. Among his pupils were Lady Morgan, Thomas Simpson Cooke, and John Field, the inventor of the nocturne, who made his debut at one of Giordani's Rotunda concerts (4 April 1792). He died in Dublin.

== Music ==
Among Giordani's compositions are a number of operas and theatrical pieces, including Genius of Ireland (1784) and The Island of Saints, or The Institution of the Shamrock (1785), the oratorio Isaac (1767), and a large number of overtures, sonatas, concertos, quartets (mostly string quartets, though some with flute, keyboard or guitar), trios for violin, flute and basso continuo, songs, etc. He is likely to have been composer and conductor at the Francis Street Chapel, Dublin, from approximately 1784 to 1798, and conducted a Te Deum of his own at the celebration upon the recovery of King George III, 30 April 1789. His last opera, The Cottage Festival, was produced at the Theatre Royal, Dublin, 28 November 1796. Giordani composed in a tuneful, galant style and was often confronted with accusations of plagiarism.

The authorship of the popular arietta Caro mio ben (1783) is as yet uncertain. It is mostly ascribed to Tommaso, but sometimes to his father or to the younger Giuseppe Giordani.

== Selected works ==
Operas and other stage works (Dublin only)

- The Beggar's Opera, new arrangement in Italian (Smock Alley Theatre, 2 January 1765)
- Don Fulminone, or The Lover with Two Mistresses, comic opera (Smock Alley, 7 January 1765)
- The Maid of the Mill, comic opera (Isaac Bickerstaff, after S. Richardson et al.) (Smock Alley, 26 March 1765)
- Love in Disguise, comic opera (Henry Lucas) (Smock Alley, 24 April 1766)
- L'eroe cinese, opera seria (Pietro Metastasio) (Smock Alley, 7 May 1766)
- Phyllis at Court, comic opera (R. Lloyd after C.-S. Favart) (Crow Street Theatre, 25 February 1767)
- The Contract, adaptation of comic opera by Philip Cogan and John Andrew Stevenson (Smock Alley, 14 May 1782)
- Gibraltar (Robert Houlton), comic opera (English Opera House, Capel Street, 18 December 1783)
- The Haunted Castle (W.C. Oulton), afterpiece (Capel St., 18 December 1783)
- The Enchantress, or The Happy Island (A.M. Edwards), musical entertainment (Capel St., 31 December 1783)
- Genius of Ireland, masque (Capel St., 9 February 1784)
- The Island of Saints, or The Institution of the Shamrock, pantomime (Smock Alley, 27 January 1785)
- Calypso, or Love and Enchantment, serio-comic opera (Smock Alley, April 1785)
- The Distressed Knight, or The Enchanted Lady, comic opera (Crow Street, 12 February 1791)
- The Siege of Belgrade, or The Turkish Overthrow, adaptation of Stephen Storace's opera (Crow St., 14 December 1791)
- The Cottage Festival, or A Day in Wales (L. MacNally), comic opera (Crow Street, 28 November 1796)

Oratorios and cantatas (Dublin)

- Isaac, oratorio (after Pietro Metastasio), 1767
- The Castle Ode (text, G.E. Howard), 1769
- Ode on the Prince of Wales Attaining His Majority (R. Houlton), 1783
- Elliott's Wreath, or Gibraltar Preserved (R. Houlton), cantata, 1783)
- Ode on the Passions, 1789
- Te Deum (for the recovery of George III), 1789
- Kyrie and Gloria, 1792

Songs

- Six duettini italiens op. 6 (c. 1773)
- Six Canzonets op. 11 (1775)
- Six Italian Canzonets op. 13 (c. 1775)
- Eight English Canzonets op. 15 (1776)
- Six English Canzonets op. 16 (1777)
- At the Close of the Day: the Hermit, a favourite English Ballad op. 20 (1778)
- A Fourth Sett of English Canzonetts op. 22 (c. 1780)
- Six English Canzonets op. 28 (1781)
- Six Favourite Songs, the Words taken from the Reliques of Ancient English Poetry (c. 1785)
- Six Canzonets (1795)

Orchestral music

- A Select Overture in Eight Parts (c. 1767)
- A Favourite Overture in Eight Parts (c. 1780)

Chamber music

- Sei quintetti [op. 1], for harpsichord and string quartet (1771)
- Six Quartettos op. 2: four for string quartet, two for flute, violin, viola, cello (1772)
- Six Chamber Concertos op. 3, for flute, 2 violins and basso continuo (b.c.) (c. 1773)
- Six Sonatas op. 4, for keyboard (c. 1773)
- Six Sonatas op. 5, for violin and harpsichord (c. 1773)
- Six Duets op. 7, for 2 flutes (1774–5)
- Sei quartetti op. 8 for string quartet (c. 1775)
- Six Easy Solos op. 9 for flute & b.c. (1774)
- Six Sonatas op. 10, for keyboard (1775)
- Six Trios op. 12, for flute, viola, cello (1775)
- Six Concertos op. 14, for harpsichord or pianoforte, 2 violins & b.c. (1776)
- Six quatuor op. 17, for harpsichord, flute, violin, double bass (1778)
- Six Duettos op. 18, for 2 celli (c. 1780)
- Six Concertos op. 19, for flute, 2 violins & b.c. (c. 1780)
- Six Duettos op. 21 (4 for violin cello; 2 for 2 violins) (c. 1780)
- A Second Sett of Six Concertos op. 23, for harpsichord or piano, 2 violins & b.c. (1779)
- Six Sonatas op. 24, for violin or flute and harpsichord or piano (c. 1779)
- Six Solos and One Trio (solos for guitar, with thorough bass for harpsichord; the trio for guitar, violin and double bass (c. 1780)
- Six Marches, Six Quick Steps and Two Concertos Militaire for harpsichord or piano (1780)
- Twelve Progressive Lessons ... Composed for the Improvement of Young Practitioners op. 25, for keyboard (1780)
- Six Sonatas op. 27, for violin and harpsichord or piano (1781)
- Three Sonatas op. 30, for flute or violin, bass viol or viola and harpsichord or piano (1782)
- Six Sonatas, for violin and harpsichord or piano (1783)
- Six Progressive Lessons, for harpsichord or piano (1784)
- Four Favourite Duettinos, for harpsichord or piano (1784)
- Three Sonatas op. 31, for violin, cello and harpsichord or piano (c. 1785)
- Six Grand Lessons op. 32, for violin and harpsichord or piano (c. 1785)
- Three Concertos ... Third Set op. 33[a], for 2 violins, harpsichord or piano & b.c. (1786)
- Fourteen Preludes or Capriccios and Eight Cadences op. 33[b], for keyboard or harp (c. 1785)
- Three Sonatas op. 34, for violin and harpsichord or piano (1788)
- A Third Set of Six Duetts, for 2 flutes (before 1789)
- Countess of Antrim's Minuet, for harpsichord or piano (after 1790)
- Lady Letitia MacDonell's Minuett, for harpsichord or piano (after 1790)
- Six Sonatas op. 35, for violin and piano (1794)

== Bibliography ==
- Lawrence, W. J.: "Tommaso Giordani. An Italian Composer in Ireland", in: The Musical Antiquary 2 (1910–11), pp. 99–107.
- Hogan, Ita M.: Anglo-Irish Music 1780-1830 (Cork: Cork University Press, 1966).
- Walsh, T. J.: Opera in Dublin 1705-1797. The Social Scene (Dublin: Allen Figgis, 1973).
- Paton, J. G.: "Caro mio ben: Some Early Sources", in: Bulletin of the National Association of Teachers of Singing 37 (1981) no. 2, pp. 20–22.
- Zanetti, E.: "Di alcuni interrogativi intorno a Caro mio ben", in: A. Ziino (ed.): Musica senza aggetivi: Studi per Fedele D'Amico (Florence, 1991), pp. 61–83.
- Boydell, Brian: Rotunda Music in Eighteenth-Century Dublin (Dublin: Irish Academic Press, 1992).
- Klein, Axel: "Stage-Irish, or The National in Irish Opera", in: The Opera Quarterly 21 (2005) 1, pp. 27–67.
- Rhodes, David J.: "Giordani, Tommaso", in: The Encyclopaedia of Music in Ireland, ed. by H. White & B. Boydell (Dublin: UCD Press, 2013).
- Sharpe, Richard: "Tommaso Giordani, Gregorio Ballabene’s Messa a dodici cori con organo and Sacred Music in Late-Eighteenth-Century Dublin", in Journal of the Society for Musicology in Ireland, 11 (2016) pp. 25–35.
