= Capel Street Theatre =

Theatre in Dublin, Ireland

Coordinates: 53.3468°N 6.2686°W

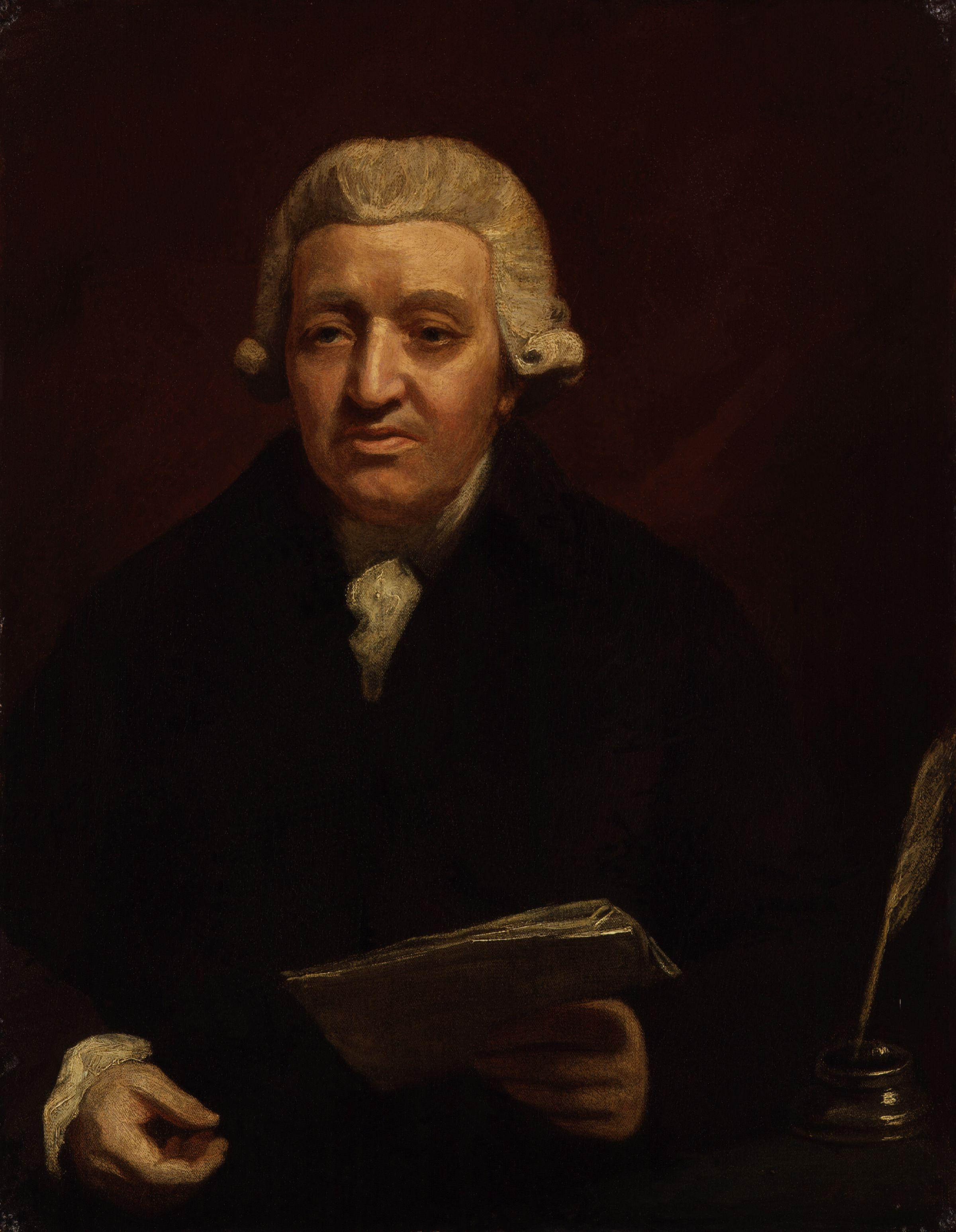
The noted actor Charles Macklin appeared at Capel Street Theatre

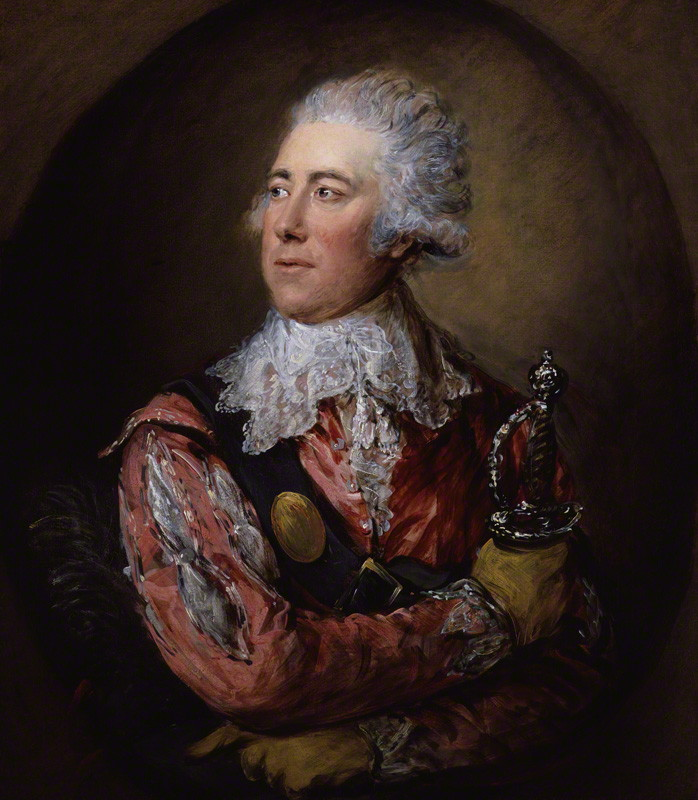
William Thomas Lewis acted in False Delicacy at the theatre in 1770

Capel Street Theatre was an 18th-century theatre located on Capel Street in Dublin, Ireland.

The Capel Street Theatre had two distinct periods in its history. The first theatre on the site was called the 'New Theatre in Capel Street' or 'City Theatre in Capel Street' and was built by William 'Harlequin' Phillips on a strip of land 50 feet by 100 feet that he leased on the West side of Capel Street between Little Strand Street and Mary's Abbey. In 1744 Phillips and his wife were members of the United Company in Dublin; they and other members of the troupe became increasingly dissatisfied with their treatment, so Phillips, his wife and members of the Company went to the small playhouse he had built and which opened in January 1745. The theatre stood some 50 feet back from the street behind Nos 136 and 137 Capel Street and was reached by way of a passageway. The theatre's auditorium had boxes, lattices, an orchestra pit and first and second floor galleries. However, the theatre had been built hastily causing concerns about its safety, forcing the manager to issue a statement that he would obtain the necessary certificates from Master Builders. This theatre closed in 1749 and the building was appropriated for other uses.

The second theatre was known as the City Theatre and was in the same building as the earlier theatre and opened on 26 February 1770 with the investors being Mr. Dawson, Mr. Mahon, and Mr. Wilkes. The theatre opened with a production featuring William Thomas Lewis.

Dawson was the manager of this new erected company, and by the experience he had had, was, in many respects, equal to the task. He was active, industrious, and intelligent, well acquainted with the world, and prompt to improve every opportunity fortune threw in his way. The theatre was elegantly ornamented and beautified; the scenes new painted, by Jolly. The wardrobe, as might be expected, light, but fashionable, and shewy.

Every arrangement being adjusted, in the best manner the times would permit, the new adventurers opened on Monday February 26th, 1770, with a new comedy, never performed in this kingdom, written by Hugh Kelly, Esq and then in reputation in London, called False Delicacy.

The theatre closed in 1784.

Among the actors to appear here were: Charles Macklin, Elizabeth Younge, William Thomas Lewis, and Henrietta Amelia Leeson. The dramatist Robert Houlton wrote works for the theatre for a season, sharing the honours with Walley Chamberlain Oulton.
