= St. Vincent's Hospital, Fairview =

Psychiatric hospital in Dublin, Ireland

- Shown in Dublin

Geography
- Location: Fairview, Dublin, Ireland
- Coordinates: 53.366685°N 6.24399°W

Organisation
- Type: Specialist

Services
- Speciality: Psychiatric Hospital

History
- Founded: 1857

Links
- Website: www.stvincentshospital.ie

St. Vincent's Hospital, Fairview (Irish: Ospidéal Naomh Uinseann, Fionnradharc) is a small psychiatric hospital in Fairview, Dublin, Ireland.

== History ==
The hospital was established, following a bequest by Elizabeth Magan (sister of the informant, Francis Magan), at Richmond House in Fairview in May 1857. The Daughters of Charity of St. Vincent de Paul were responsible for its operation from its founding, but following its decision to become a voluntary hospital in 1974, the daughters left in May 1998. The hospital is mentioned in James Joyce's A Portrait of the Artist as a Young Man published in 1916.

After the introduction of deinstitutionalisation in the late 1980s the hospital went into a period of decline. However a new adolescent inpatient unit was opened in 2009.

Double Olympic gold-medallist Kellie Harrington (Boxing, 2020) works there as a cleaner.
