= William Gorman (priest) =

Anglican priest

William Charles Gorman (b Lurgan 25 September 1826 - d Thomastown 20 May 1916) was an Anglican priest in the late nineteenth and early twentieth centuries, who served most notably as Archdeacon of Ossory from 1883 until 1911.

He was the son of the Reverend William Fortescue Gorman of Tannaghmore, Lurgan, County Antrim and his wife Harriet Greene (died 1839), daughter of Sir Jonas Greene, Recorder of Dublin and his wife, the actress Marianne Hitchcock. He married Harriet Pitcairn West of Cork, daughter of Henry Augustus West and Elizabeth Denne Pitcairn, in 1856. They had at least two children, William and Amy. His widow died in 1926.

A graduate of Trinity College Dublin he was ordained in 1852. After curacies at Kiltegan and St Canice's, Kilkenny he was the Incumbent at Kilmocar, 1859–63; Kilsheelan, 1863–69; and Thomastown, 1869–1908.
