= Carmine Giordani =

Italian composer and organist (d. 1758)

Carmine Giordani (c. 1685 in Cerreto Sannita, Kingdom of Naples – 1758 in Naples) was an Italian composer and organist. He studied at the Conservatorio napoletano della Pietà dei Turchini with Gennaro Ursino (1650–1715) and Nicola Fago.

It was long mistakenly thought that Carmine Giordani was the father of Tommaso Giordani, who died in Dublin, and Giuseppe Giordani (1743–1798), called "Giordanello," but this turns out not to be the case; their father was Giuseppe Giordani, an opera buffa singer.

== Bibliography ==
- Enrica Donisi (2012). Istituti, bande e società. Studi sulla musica a Benevento tra il 1561 e il 1961. Edizioni Realtà Sannita, Benevento, pp. 122–124.
