= Nicola Fago =

Italian Baroque composer and teacher (1677–1745)

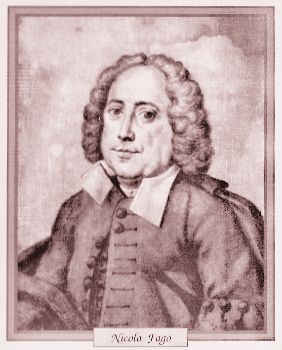
Nicola Fago.

Francesco Nicola Fago, 'II Tarantino' (26 February 1677 – 18 February 1745) was an Italian Baroque composer and teacher. He was the father of Lorenzo Fago (1704-1793).

== Biography ==
Born in Taranto, in the Apulia region, he studied music under Francesco Provenzale at the Conservatorio della Pietà dei Turchini in Naples between 1693 and 1695.

Between 1704 and 1708, he worked at the Conservatorio Sant'Onofrio, but from 1705 to 1740, he was based at the Conservatorio della Pietà dei Turchini, where his pupils included Leonardo Leo, Francesco Feo, Giuseppe de Majo, Niccolo Jommelli, Nicola Sala, Michele de Falco, Carmine Giordani as well as his own son, Lorenzo. See: List of music students by teacher: C to F#Nicola Fago.

From 1709 to 1731, Nicola Fago served at the Tesoro di San Gennaro. He died in Naples in 1745.

== Operas ==
- Lo Masiello
- L'Astratto (1709)
- Il Radamista (1707)
- La Dafne
- Cassandra Indovina (1711)
- "Magnificat" ten vocals + instruments
- "Stabat Mater" 4 vocals + a quartet
- Il Faraone Sommerso (1709)

== Other works ==
- Le fenzejune abbendurate, Commedia per musica, 1710
- La Cianna, Commedia per musica, 1711
- Lo Masillo Dramma per musica (second act by Michele de Falco), 1712
- La Dafne, Favola pastorale in stile arcadio, 1714
