= Kilmocar =

Civil parish and townland in County Kilkenny, Ireland

Coordinates: 52.769°N 7.273°W

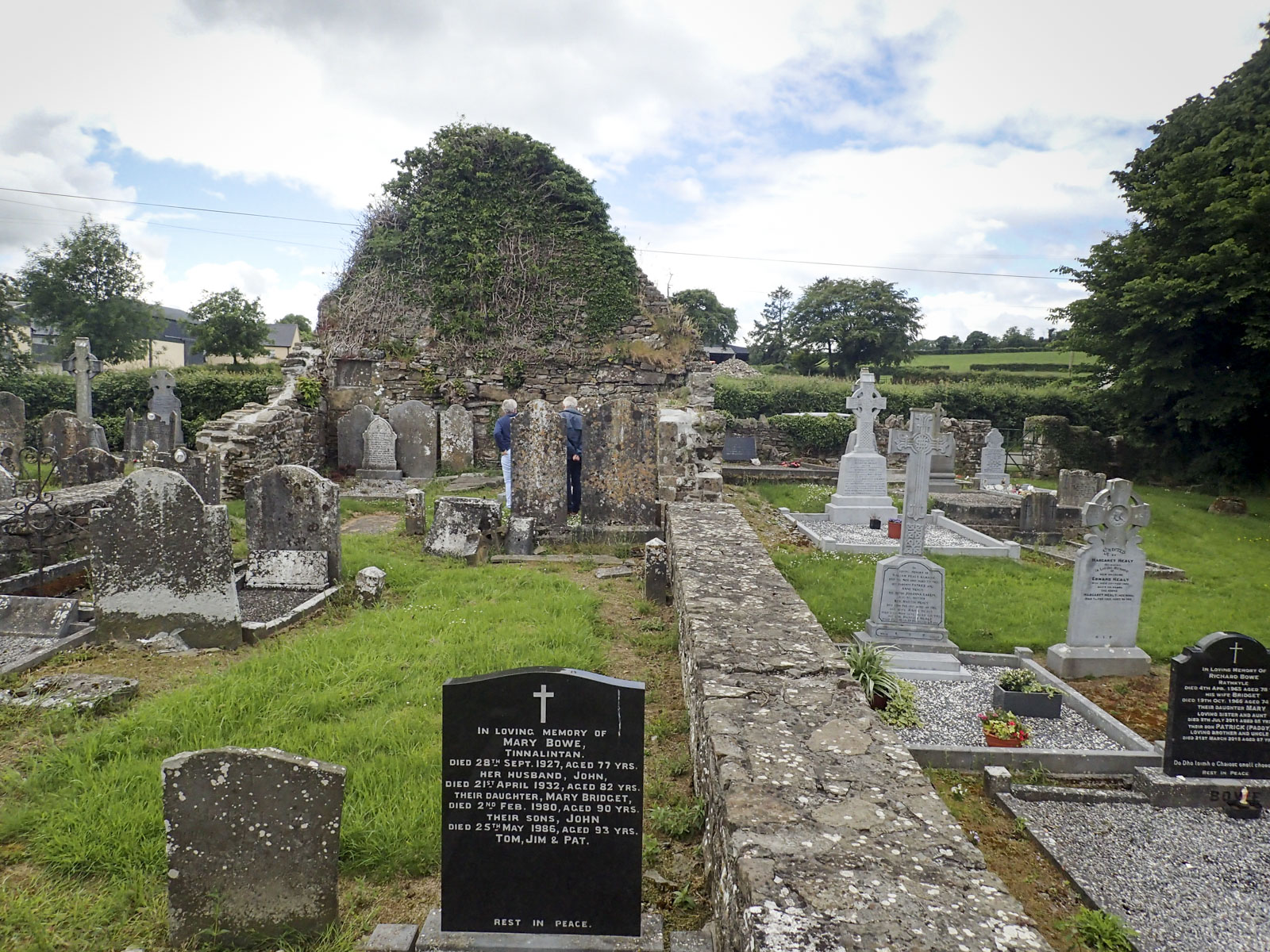
Ruined church and graveyard in Kilmacar

Kilmocar or Kilmacar (Irish: Cill Mocheara) is a townland and civil parish in County Kilkenny, Ireland. The ruins of a medieval church lie within Kilmacar townland.
