= Jonas Greene =

Irish barrister and magistrate

Sir Jonas Greene (1767-1828) was an Irish barrister and magistrate, who held the office of Recorder of Dublin.

He was born in Dublin, the eldest son of Richard Greene. He was called to the Bar, although few details of his legal practice seem to survive. In a letter he wrote to Dublin Castle in 1823 he claimed that his private practice had been extremely lucrative; in pleading for an increase in salary, he referred to the serious financial loss he had suffered in accepting an official position.

== Recorder of Dublin ==
In 1822 he was made Recorder of Dublin and knighted. The Recorder was the chief magistrate for Dublin city, with responsibility for keeping the peace. The office was an onerous one and was generally agreed to have a heavier workload than a High Court judge. Greene from the available evidence seems to have been a particularly diligent and hard-working official. A debate on the duties of the Recorder of Dublin in the English House of Commons, held three years after his death, revealed that he held two sessions of his court every week, with extra sessions as the workload required. Within a little over a year of taking up office he was writing to Henry Goulburn, the Chief Secretary for Ireland, asking for an increase in salary appropriate to the very heavy workload, and complaining that his pay was already in arrears.

== Family ==
He married in 1790 the leading Dublin actress Marianne Hitchcock. She was the daughter of Robert Hitchcock of York, the author and playwright, best remembered for An Historical View of the Irish Stage, and his wife Sarah Webb, who like her daughter was a popular actress on the Dublin stage. They had twelve children. The eldest son, Richard Wilson Greene, followed his father to the Bar and became a senior judge. Of their daughters, Harriet married the Reverend William Fortescue Gorman of Tannaghmore, County Antrim. They were the parents of William Gorman, Archdeacon of Ossory 1883-1911. Harriet died in 1839, aged about 32. Her sister Marianne married William Wallace, and another sister Elizabeth married John Gason. Several other sisters died unmarried. Their brother Arthur married Frances Shaw, a relative of George Bernard Shaw. Arthur's daughter Cecilia married as his first wife Sir Samuel Walker, 1st Baronet, Lord Chancellor of Ireland.

Jonas died at Bath in early March 1828, having been ill for several months. Marianne died in 1854, and was buried in Mount Jerome Cemetery. Five of her children, Jonas junior, Rachel, Harriet, Sarah and Catherine, are interred in the same grave as their mother.

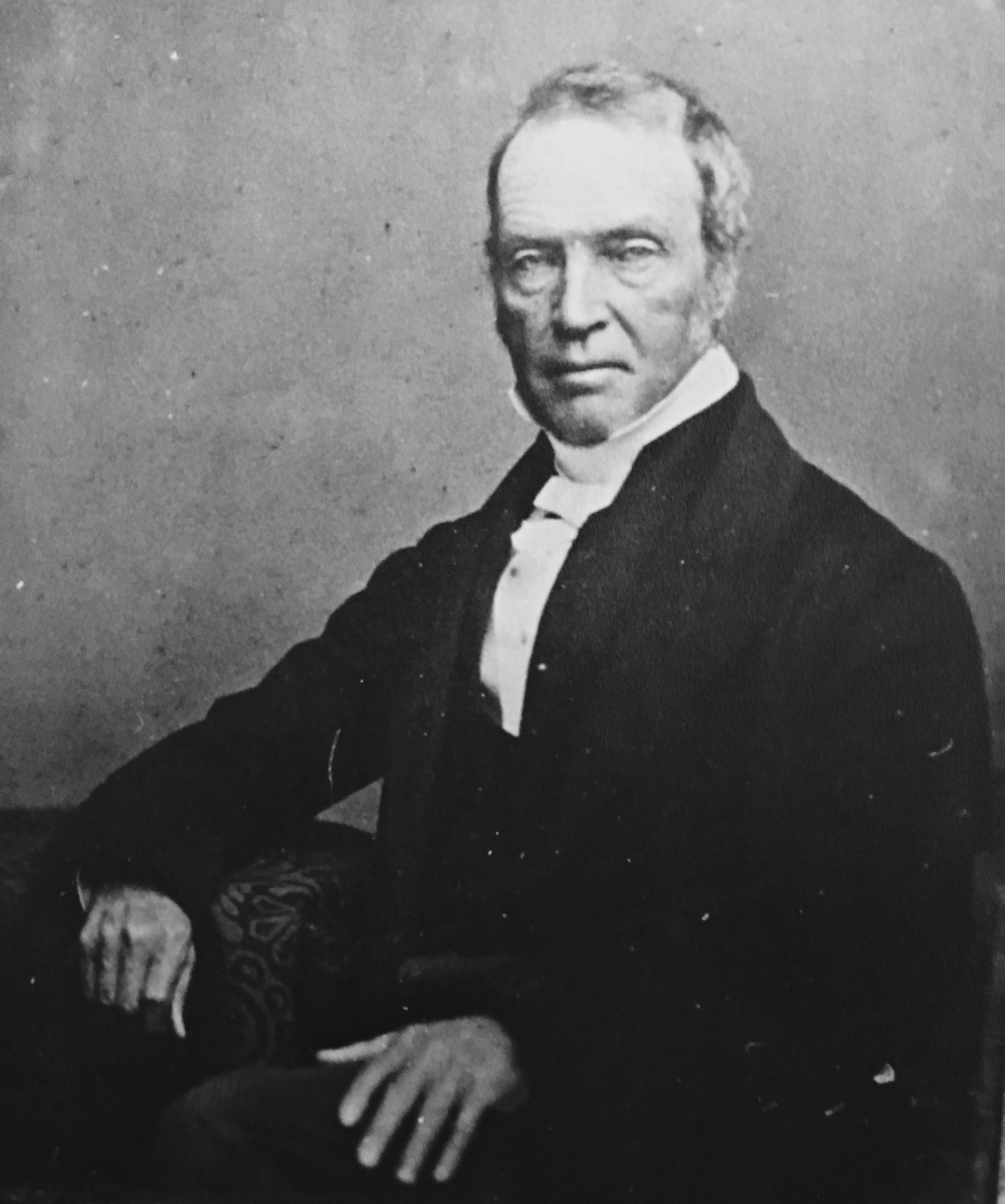
Photo of Richard Wilson Greene, Irish judge, eldest son of Sir Jonas Greene and his wife Marianne Hitchcock

== Arms ==
Coat of arms of Jonas Greene
Notes Confirmed by Arthur Edward Vicars, Ulster King of Arms, on 19 May 1896. Crest Issuant from a ducal coronet Gyles a buck's head Or charged with a crescent Gules for difference. Escutcheon Vert three bucks trippant Or each gorged with a ducal coronet Gules in chief a crescent of the second for difference. Motto Nec Timeo Nec Sperno

== Sources ==
- Annual Register for the Year 1828
- Ball, F. Elrington The Judges in Ireland 1221-1921 John Murray London 1926
- Lee, Sidney, ed. (1891). "Hitchcock, Robert" . Dictionary of National Biography. Vol. 27. London: Smith, Elder & Co. p. 15.
- Hansard's Parliamentary Debates 1831
- Montgomery-Massingberd, Hugh Burke's Irish Family Records London 1976
- National Archives of Ireland
- "Ven. William Gorman" entry in Who was Who 2020
