= Francis Higgins (1746–1802) =

Irish newspaper proprietor and spy

- Born: 1746
- Died: 19 January 1802 (aged 55–56); Dublin
- Occupations: Newspaper proprietor and spy

Francis Higgins, also called the "Sham Squire", (1746 – 19 January 1802) was an Irish newspaper proprietor and spy.

== Biography ==
Higgins was the son of humble parents, who migrated from Downpatrick in Ulster to Dublin. Higgins passed his early years in menial employments, became an attorney's clerk, was converted to Protestantism, and, by practising gross deception, married a respectable lady, whose relatives in 1766 prosecuted him for fraud. Higgins was convicted, and was for some time imprisoned. To this incident was attributed Higgins's sobriquet of the ‘Sham Squire.’ After his release he formed lucrative connections with lottery-offices and gambling-houses. He was admitted an attorney at Dublin in 1780, and secured the posts of deputy-coroner and under-sheriff. Higgins became owner of the newspaper styled ‘The Freeman's Journal,’ which, with his own services, he placed at the disposal of the administrators of the government at Dublin. Thenceforth Higgins continuously assailed in his paper the opponents of the government, and Henry Grattan denounced in parliament the mendacities and unscrupulous conduct of the journal. In 1788 Higgins was appointed a magistrate by Lord-chancellor Lifford. John Magee, in his paper, the ‘Dublin Evening Post,’ published numerous satires in prose and verse on Higgins and his associate, Richard Daly. Magee exposed Higgins's antecedents, and denounced him as a venal journalist, a corrupt magistrate, and a proprietor of houses of ill-repute. In 1790 Higgins prosecuted Magee for libel in the court of king's bench. Through Higgins's alleged influence with John Scott, earl of Clonmel, lord chief justice, he obtained, by authority of that court, writs styled ‘fiats,’ under which the defendants were liable to imprisonment till they found surety for the entire amount claimed as damages. These proceedings formed the subject of discussion in the House of Commons of Ireland. Lord-chancellor FitzGibbon removed Higgins from the magistracy in 1791, and in 1794 he was struck off the roll of attorneys. In 1795 he warned the government of a projected attack on the new lord-lieutenant, Lord Camden. Through the under-secretary, Edward Cooke, with whom he had had previous relations, Higgins secretly communicated to the Irish government in 1798 particulars as to persons connected with the revolutionary movements in Ireland. The governmental account of secret service money, under date of 20 June 1798, contains an entry of a payment of 1,000l. to ‘F. H.’ for the discovery of Lord Edward Fitzgerald. The initials are those of Higgins. Cooke recommended Lord Castlereagh to appropriate a pension of 300l. per annum to Higgins, on the ground that he had given him much information and all the intelligence which had enabled him to effect the arrest of Lord Edward Fitzgerald. Higgins died in affluence at Dublin on 19 January 1802, and was buried in the cemetery of Kilbarrack, Dublin.
