= Nicolina Giordani =

Italian opera singer (d. after 1775)

Nicolina Giordani (c.1740 – after 1775), also known by the stage name La Signora Spiletta or La Spiletta, was an Italian opera singer.

A member of the Giordanis family from Naples, she was the daughter of Antonia and Giuseppe Giordani, librettist and composer, and the sister of Francesco and Marina, both singers, and Tommaso, a composer and instrumentalist. She performed in opera productions with her family's company in Northern Italy, Germany, Holland and France, before settling in London, where she was active between 1753 and 1774. She became known by her stage name after a popular performance as the character from Gli Amanti Gelosi. She was described by Thomas Gray as a singer "with the utmost justness of ear, the strongest expression of countenance, the most speaking eyes, the greatest vivacy [sic] & variety of gesture". She also received praise by Horace Walpole, who wrote that she "beats all the actors and actresses I ever saw for vivacity and variety".
