= Walley Chamberlain Oulton =

Irish playwright and theatre historian

Walley Chamberlain Oulton (1770?–1820?) was an Irish playwright, theatre historian and man of letters.

== Life ==
Born in Dublin, he was educated there in a private school. While a schoolboy he achieved some reputation as a writer of farces and musical extravaganzas, and his dramatic essays were performed at the Dublin theatres in Smock Alley, Crow Street, Capel Street, and Fishamble Street. Most of these pieces were published.

About 1786, Oulton left Dublin, still a youth, to try his fortunes in London. John Palmer, the lessee of the Royalty Theatre in Wellclose Square, accepted the offer of his services, and in 1787 he produced Oulton's ‘Hobson's Choice, or Thespis in Distress,’ a satire on contemporary theatrical enterprise. Its boldness annoyed the managers of the patent-houses, who were engaged in a fierce struggle with Palmer. Oulton then induced an acquaintance to offer in her name his next piece, ‘As it should be,’ to George Colman the younger of the Haymarket, where it was produced on 3 June 1789. The piece was published anonymously; but Colman discovered its author, and gave Oulton much encouragement. On 7 July 1792 he produced a short piece by Oulton, ‘All in Good Humour’ (London, 1792); there followed at the same house ‘Irish Tar,’ a musical piece, 24 August 1797; ‘The Sixty-third Letter,’ a musical farce, 28 July 1802; ‘The Sleep-walker, or which is the Lady?’ 15 June 1812; and ‘My Landlady's Gown,’ 10 August 1816. Meanwhile, at Covent Garden, Oulton secured the production of two similar pieces, ‘Perseverance,’ 2 June 1789, and ‘Botheration,’ on 2 May 1798. David Erskine Baker credited him with the choruses in Richard Brinsley Sheridan's Pizarro which was produced in 1799. In 1798 he provided two pantomimes, ‘Pyramus and Thisbe’ and the ‘Two Apprentices,’ for the Birmingham theatre.

His last connection with the stage was on 27 February 1817, when his farce ‘Frighten'd to Death’ was produced at Drury Lane.

== Works ==
In 1784, there appeared the ‘Haunted Castle,’ the ‘Happy Disguise,’ and the ‘New Wonder;’ in 1785 the ‘Madhouse,’ ‘New Way to keep a Wife at Home,’ ‘Poor Maria,’ the ‘Recruiting Manager,’ and ‘Curiosity.’ The ‘Haunted Castle’ and the ‘Madhouse’ are said to have held the stage for some years.

Oulton was acquainted with the work of August von Kotzebue on which Sheridan's play Pizarro was based, and produced in 1800 a volume called ‘The Beauties of Kotzebue.’

Between 2 January and 26 February 1787, he produced a tri-weekly sheet, called The Busybody, on the model of The Spectator; at the twenty-fifth number it ceased. The whole work was issued in two volumes in 1789. In 1795 he published, under the pseudonym of ‘George Horne, D.D.,’ two tracts attacking the pretensions of Richard Brothers the prophet and of his disciple Nathaniel Brassey Halhed. The first was entitled ‘Sound Argument, dictated by Common-sense’ (Oxford, 1795); the second, ‘Occasional Remarks addressed to N. B. Halhed, Esq.’ (London, 1795).

Oulton argued for the authenticity of Vortigern, one of the Ireland Shakespeare forgeries. He issued an anonymous pamphlet, ‘Vortigern under Consideration’ (1796), on Samuel Ireland's behalf.

On recent theatrical history, he wrote ‘The History of the Theatres of London from 1771 to 1795,’ which appeared in 1796 in two volumes, a continuation of Benjamin Victor's ‘History.’ For James Barker, the theatrical publisher, he prepared in 1802, mainly ‘from the manuscripts of Mr. Henderson,’ ‘Barker's Continuation of Egerton's Theatrical Remembrancer … from 1787 to 1801.’ Finally he produced ‘A History of the Theatres of London from 1795 to 1817,’ London, 3 vols. 1818.

Other publications were:

- ‘Shakespeare's Poems,’ with a memoir, 1804.
- ‘The Traveller's Guide; or, an English Itinerary...a complete Topography of England and Wales...Illustrated with sixty-six correct picturesque views, and a Whole-Sheet Coloured Map of England and Wales,’ London, 1805, 2 vols., published by James Cundee, Ivy-Lane.
- ‘S. Gessner's Death of Abel,’ a translation, London, 1811.
- ‘The Beauties of Anne Seward,’ 1813.
- ‘Authentic and Impartial Memoirs of her late Majesty Charlotte, Queen of Great Britain and Ireland … assisted by eminent literary Characters,’ 1819.
- ‘Picture of Margate and its Vicinity, with a Map and Twenty Views,’ 1820.

After 1820 Oulton disappears.
