= Henry Mossop =

Irish actor (1729–1773)

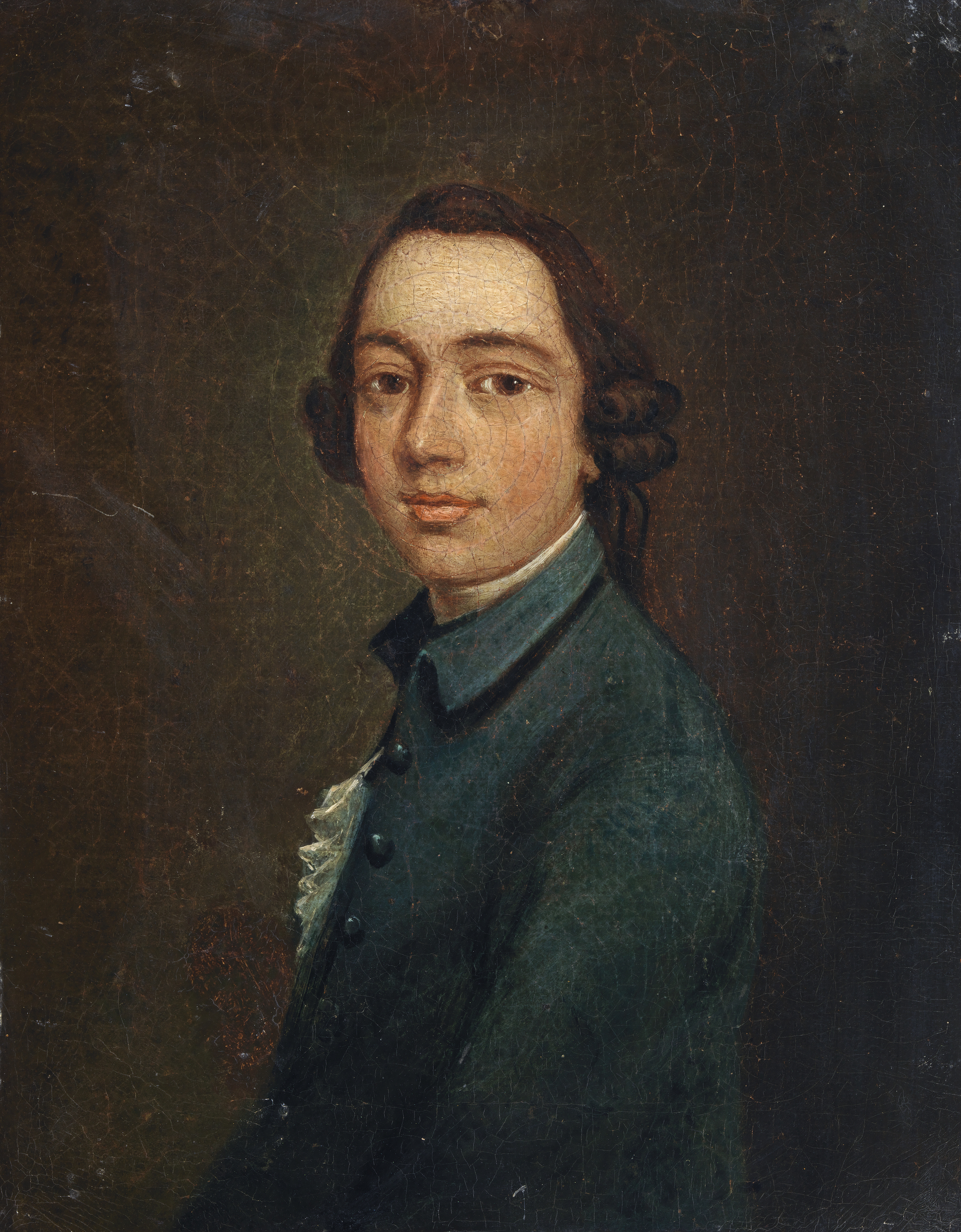

Henry Mossop (1729 – 18 November 1773) was an Irish actor.

== Life ==
He was born in Dunmore, County Galway, where his father was a clergyman. He made his first stage appearance as Zanga in Young's tragedy The Revenge at the Smock Alley Theatre in Dublin in 1749.

Mossop's first London appearance was made in 1751 under Garrick's management as Richard III. He returned to Ireland in 1759 and added to his laurels. Then he attempted management on his own account. He took over the Smock Alley theatre in 1760 and entered into intense rivalry with the Crow Street Theatre, run by Spranger Barry, which involved both houses in financial difficulties. When he went to London in 1771 to recruit actors he was arrested for debt and made a bankrupt. He toured the continent for a year in an effort to acquire funds but his health broke down and he died in poverty on 18 November 1773 (another account, in the Gentleman's Magazine, gives his date of death as December 1774).

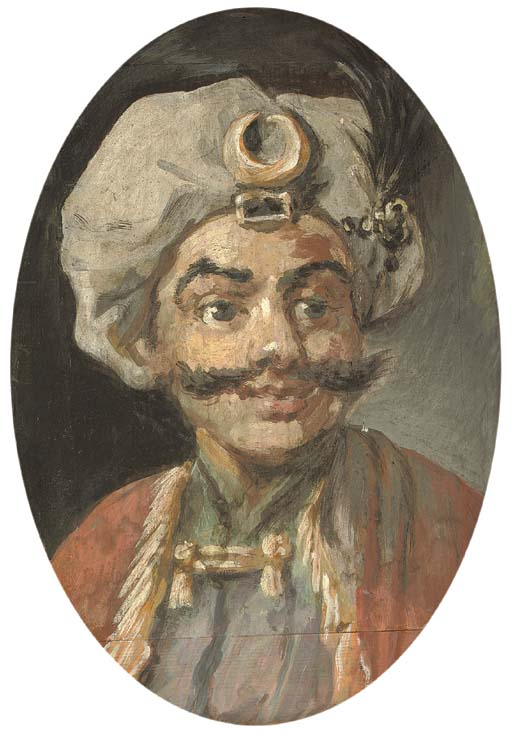
A Turk's head: Mr Henry Mossop in the guise of Bajazet from Nicholas Rowe's play Tamerlane, by William Hogarth

== See also ==
- Samuel Reddish
