= Crow Street Theatre =

Theatre in Dublin, Ireland

Crow Street Theatre was a theatre in Dublin, Ireland, on Crow Street in the Temple Bar area of the city, originally opened in 1758 by the actor Spranger Barry. From 1788 until 1818 it was a patent theatre.

== History ==
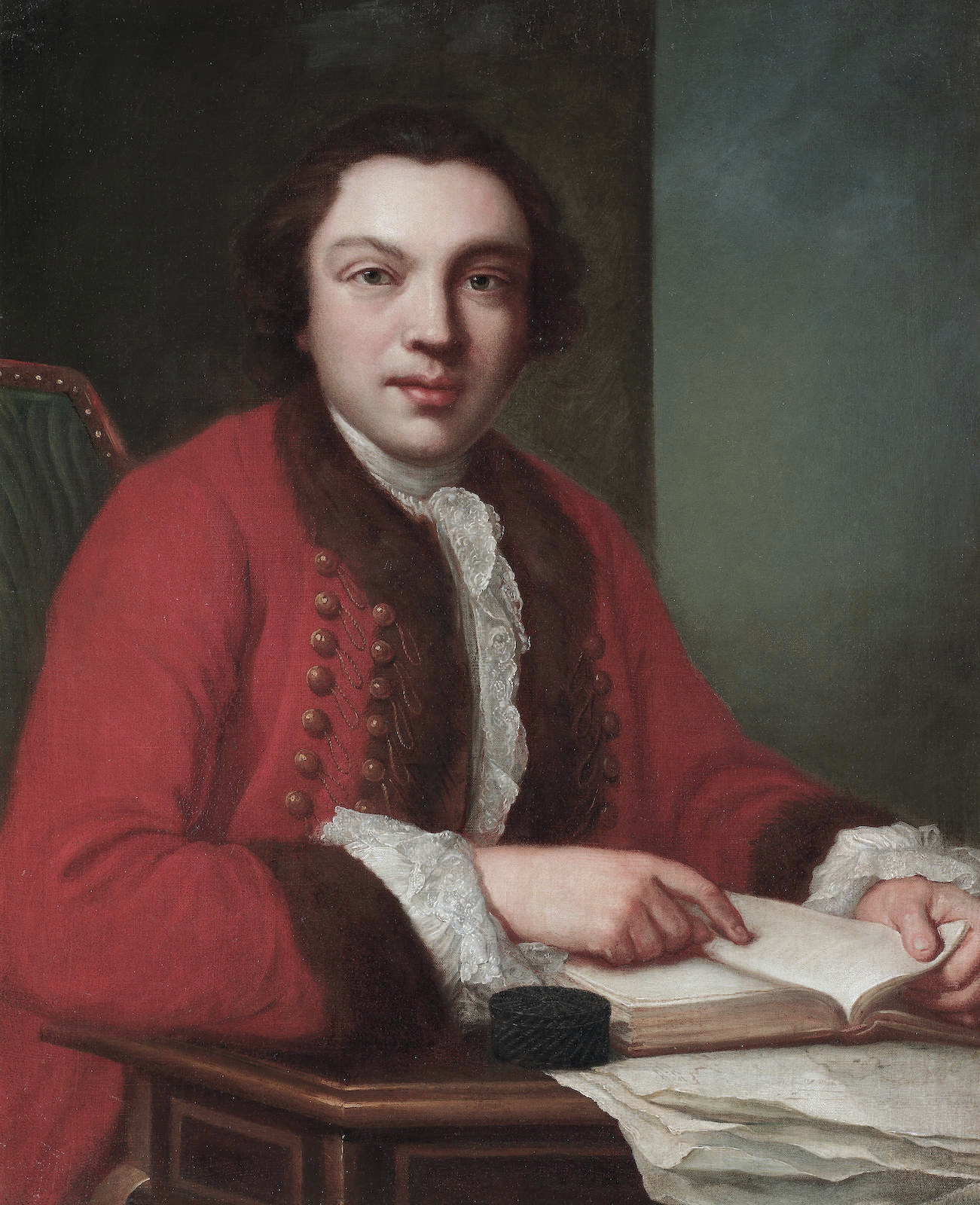
Spranger Barry

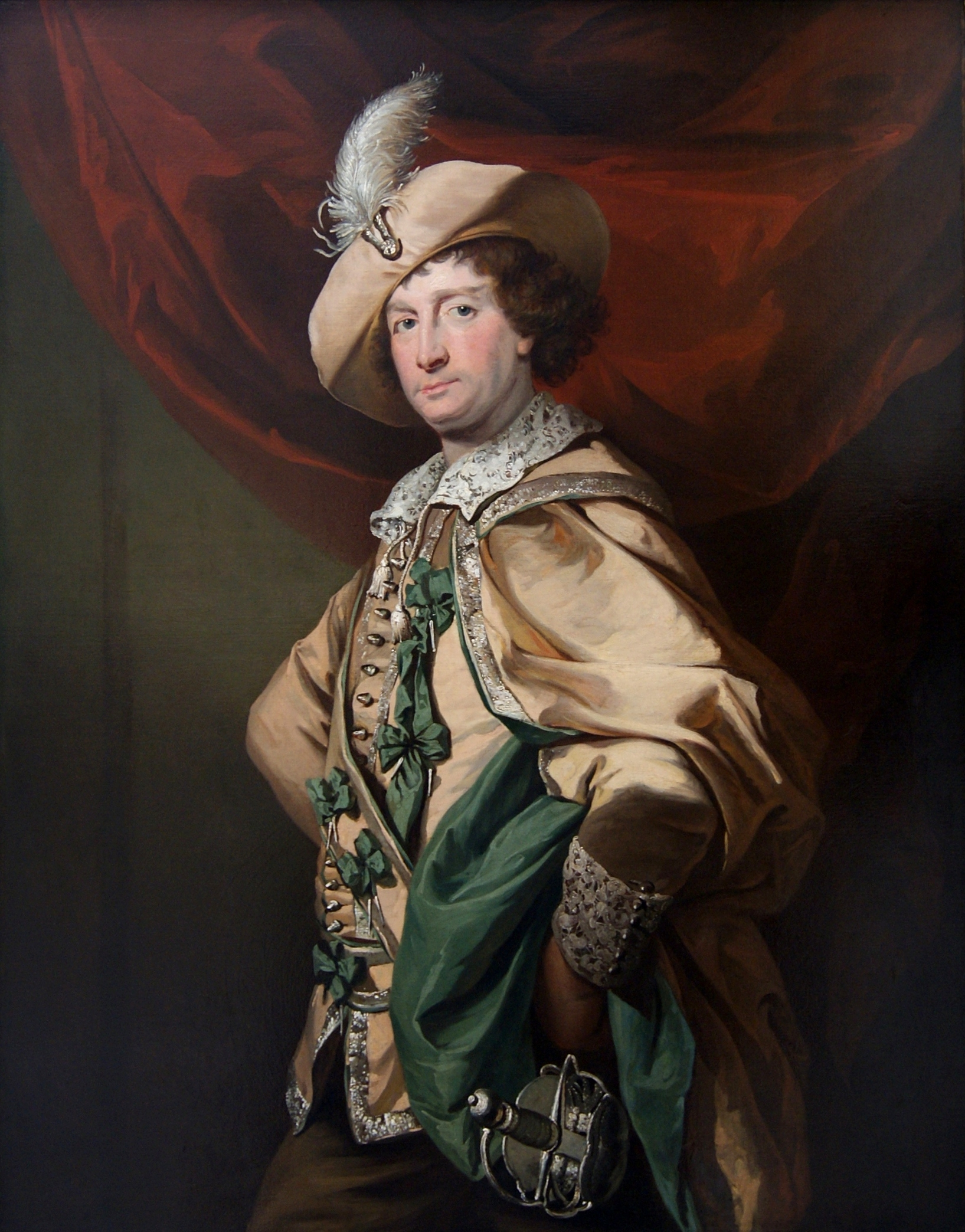
Henry Woodward as Petruchio in Catharine and Petruchio

=== Spranger Barry and Henry Woodward ===
The actor Spranger Barry (1719–1777), born in Dublin and appearing in London from 1746, induced the London-born actor Henry Woodward (1714–1777), who had saved £6,000, to participate in his project to build a theatre in Dublin. Charles Macklin participated at an early stage, but soon withdrew. Barry and Woodward moved to Dublin, and the Crow Street Theatre opened in October 1758. It struggled as a rival to the Smock Alley Theatre. Maria Nossiter (1735–1759), who had lived with Barry in London, was assigned an eighth share of the profits.

In 1760 Barry and Woodward opened a theatre in Cork, the Theatre Royal. By 1762 Woodward had lost half his savings; the partnership was dissolved, and he returned to London. Barry continued for a few more years, then also returned to London.

=== Henry Mossop and Richard Daly ===
Henry Mossop, manager of Smock Alley Theatre since 1760, took over Crow Street Theatre in 1767, but resigned the theatre in 1770; the actor Thomas Ryder, who ran Smock Alley Theatre from 1772, also ran Crow Street Theatre. In 1782 the actor Richard Daly became owner of the theatre, and in 1786, having obtained a patent from the Crown, he opened Crow Street Theatre in 1788 as the Theatre Royal, a patent theatre. £12,000 had been spent on rebuilding and decoration. It was profitable for a while, but later suffered from the opening of Astley's Amphitheatre.

=== Frederick Edward Jones ===
Frederick Edward Jones leased the theatre from Daly, and spent £1200 on renovating the house, which was decorated by Marinari and Zaffarini. It was opened in 1796, but closed when martial law was declared, relating to the Irish Rebellion of 1798. Jones obtained a new royal patent in 1798, and spent a further £5000 on the theatre, but in the political climate it had to close in 1803.

The theatre was wrecked in a riot of 1814; and there were further riots in 1819. Jones attributed his unpopularity to his being active in politics; in 1807 he had supported the election of an anti-ministerial member of parliament for Dublin. His application in 1818 for renewal of the patent was refused, being granted instead to Henry Harris, a proprietor of Covent Garden Theatre. The years of disruption had been financially detrimental, and he was imprisoned for debt. During the 1819–20 season the Crow Street Theatre did not open regularly.

=== End of the theatre ===
The theatre was rented for a short period and opened as a circus, and was then abandoned. In 1836 the Apothecaries' Hall Company bought part of the site, and a medical school was built.
