= 1779 in literature =

This article contains information about the literary events and publications of 1779.

== Events ==
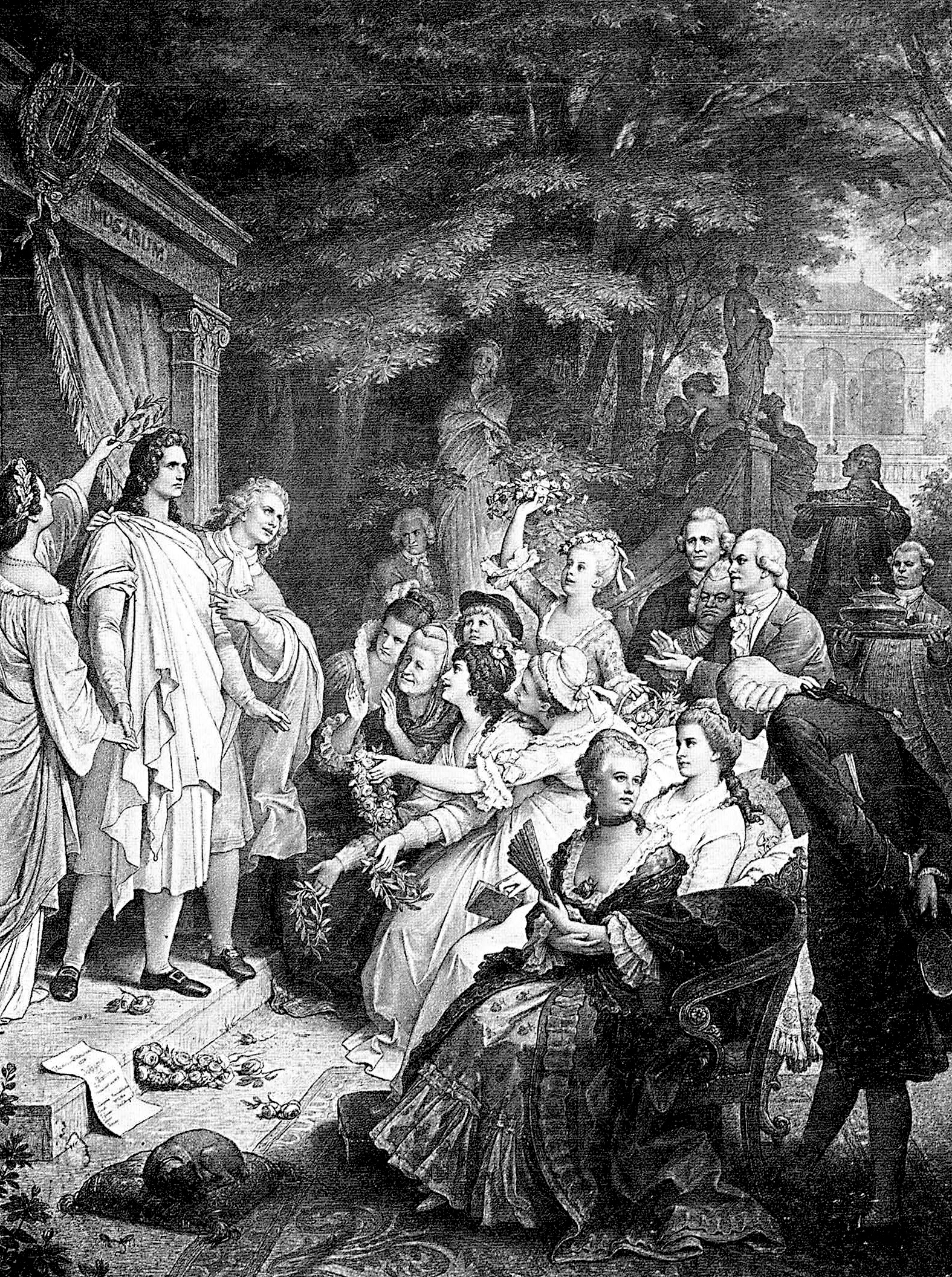
Performance of Iphigenie auf Tauris featuring Johann Wolfgang von Goethe as Orestes, Karl August, Grand Duke of Saxe-Weimar-Eisenach as Pylades, and Corona Schröter as Iphigenia

- April 6 – The premiėre of Iphigenie auf Tauris by Johann Wolfgang Goethe is held at the private Ducal Palace in Weimar.
- October 8 – William Blake enrols as a student with the Royal Academy of Arts at Somerset House in London.

== New books ==
=== Fiction ===
- Richard Graves – Columella
- Friedrich Heinrich Jacobi – Woldemar
- Ignacy Krasicki – Fables and Parables (Bajki i przypowieści)
- Nocturnal Revels
- Samuel Jackson Pratt as "Courtney Melmoth"
  - Shenstone-Green
  - The Tutor of Truth
- The Sorrows of Werther (anonymous translation of a Johann Wolfgang von Goethe work)

=== Children ===
- Joachim Heinrich Campe – Robinson der Jüngere (based on Defoe)

=== Drama ===
- Fanny Burney – The Witlings (unpublished)
- Hannah Cowley
  - Albina, Countess Raimond
  - Who's the Dupe?
- Richard Cumberland – Calypso
- Hugh Downman – Lucius Junius Brutus
- Jean-Pierre Claris de Florian – Les Deux Billets
- William Hodson – Zoraida
- Robert Jephson – The Law of Lombardy
- Gotthold Ephraim Lessing – Nathan der Weise (published)
- Hannah More – The Fatal Falsehood
- Elizabeth Richardson – The Double Deception
- Richard Brinsley Sheridan – The Critic

=== Poetry ===
- William Cowper and John Newton – Olney Hymns
- Robert Fergusson – Poems
- William Hayley – Epistle to Admiral Keppel
- Ann Murry – Poems
- Gaspar Melchor de Jovellanos – Epístola de Jovino a Anfriso, escrita desde el Paular
- Leandro Fernandez de Moratín – La toma de Granada por los Reyes Católicos don Fernando y doña Isabel
- Tomás de Iriarte – La música

=== Non-fiction ===
- John Abercrombie – The British Fruit Gardener and Art of Pruning
- Anna Barbauld – Lessons for Children
- James Burnett – Antient Metaphysics
- Edward Capell – Notes and Various Readings to Shakespeare
- George Chalmers – Political Annals of the Present United Colonies
- Edward Gibbon – A Vindication of Some Passages in the History of the Decline and Fall of the Roman Empire
- David Hume (died 1776; anonymously) – Dialogues Concerning Natural Religion
- Samuel Johnson – Prefaces, Biographical and Critical, to the Works of the English Poets
- Vicessimus Knox – Essays
- Franz Mesmer – Mémoire sur la découverte du magnétisme animal
- John Moore – A View of Society and Manners in France, Switzerland, and Germany
- Thomas Scott – The Force of Truth
- Horace Walpole – A Letter to the Editor of the Miscellanies of Thomas Chatterton

== Births ==
- January 18 – Peter Mark Roget, English lexicographer (died 1869)
- March 1 – Gottfried Weber, German writer on music (died 1839)
- March 3 – Matthäus Casimir von Collin, Austrian poet and dramatist (died 1824)
- March 10 – Frances Trollope (born Frances Milton), English novelist and writer (died 1863)
- March 30 – Antoine Ó Raifteirí, Irish Gaelic poet (died 1835)
- May 2 – John Galt, Scottish novelist and entrepreneur (died 1839)
- May 28 – Thomas Moore, Irish poet and songwriter (died 1852)
- August 1 – Francis Scott Key, American poet (died 1843)
- September 10 – Alexander Voeykov, Russian poet (died 1839)
- November 14 – Adam Oehlenschläger, Danish Romantic poet and dramatist (died 1850)
- December 22 – Thomas Gaisford, English classicist (died 1855)
- December 31 – Horace (Horatio) Smith, English poet and novelist (died 1849)

== Deaths ==
- January 20 – David Garrick, English dramatist, actor and impresario (born 1717)
- March 4 – Heinrich Leopold Wagner, German dramatist (born 1747)
- June 7 – William Warburton, English writer, critic and cleric (born 1698)
- June 10 – William Kenrick, English novelist, playwright and satirist (born c. 1725)
- July 10 – Jane Gomeldon, English essayist and writer of maxims (born c. 1720)
- July 21 – Caleb Fleming, English minister and pamphleteer (born 1698)
- November 16 – Pehr Kalm, Swedish/Finnish botanist, naturalist and travel writer (born 1716)
- December 22 – István Küzmics (Števan Küzmič), Hungarian writer in Prekmurje Slovene (Wendish) (born c. 1723)
