= A School for Greybeards =

1786 play

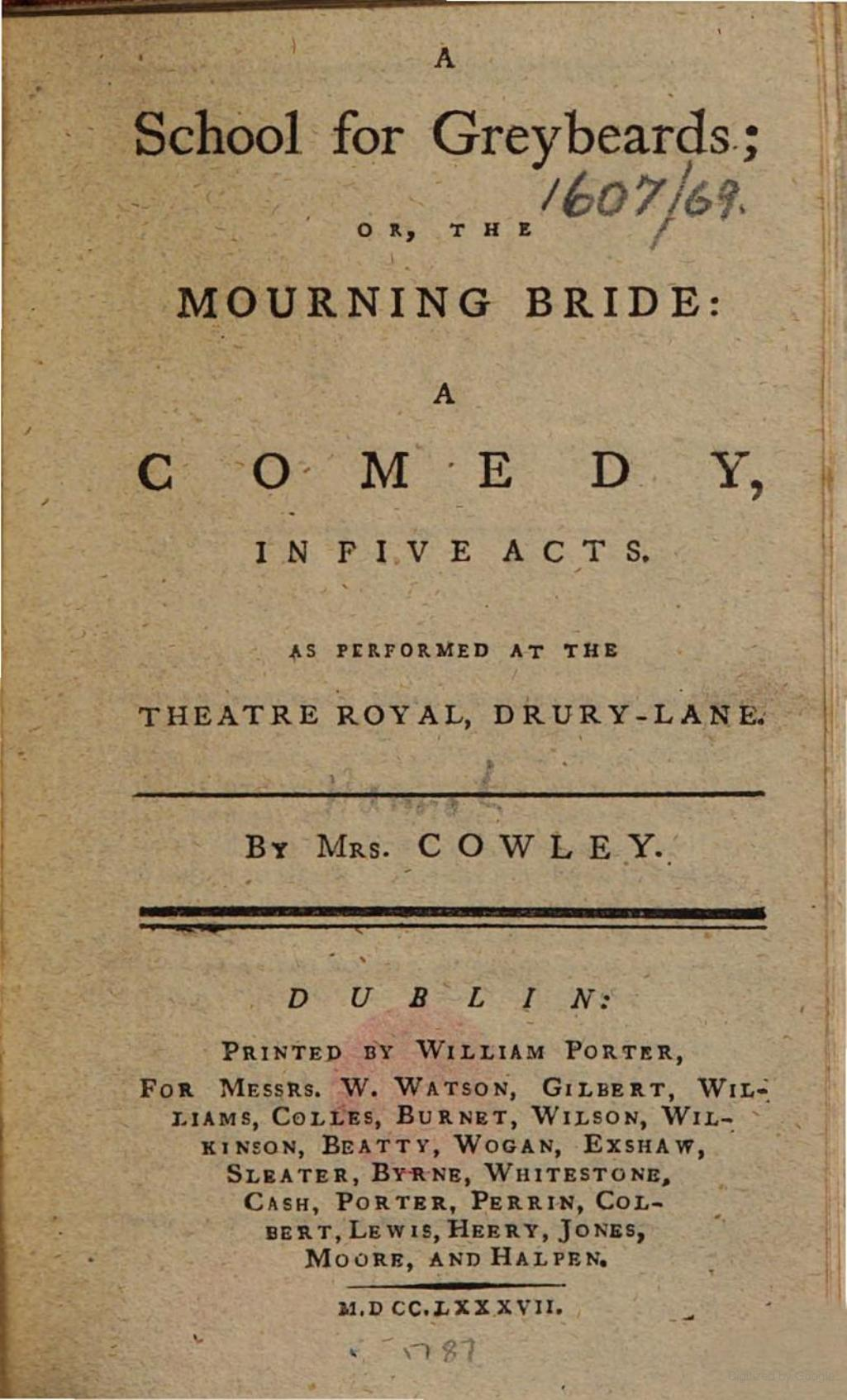
- Written by: Hannah Cowley
- Original language: English
- Genre: Comedy

Premiere
- Date premiered: 25 November 1786
- Place premiered: Theatre Royal, Drury Lane, London

A School for Greybeards is a comedy play by the British writer Hannah Cowley that premiered on November 25, 1786. The original cast included Thomas King as Don Alexis, John Philip Kemble as Don Henry, William Parsons as Don Gasper, John Bannister as Don Sebastian, John Palmer as Don Octavio, Mary Ann Wrighten as Rachel, Ann Maria Crouch as Donna Maria, Sarah Maria Wilson as Carlota, Margaret Cuyler as Donna Clara and Elizabeth Farren as Donna Seraphina.

== Bibliography ==
- Nicoll, Allardyce. A History of English Drama 1660–1900: Volume III. Cambridge University Press, 2009.
- Hogan, C.B (ed.) The London Stage, 1660–1800: Volume V. Southern Illinois University Press, 1968.
