= Priscilla Kemble =

English actress (1756–1845)

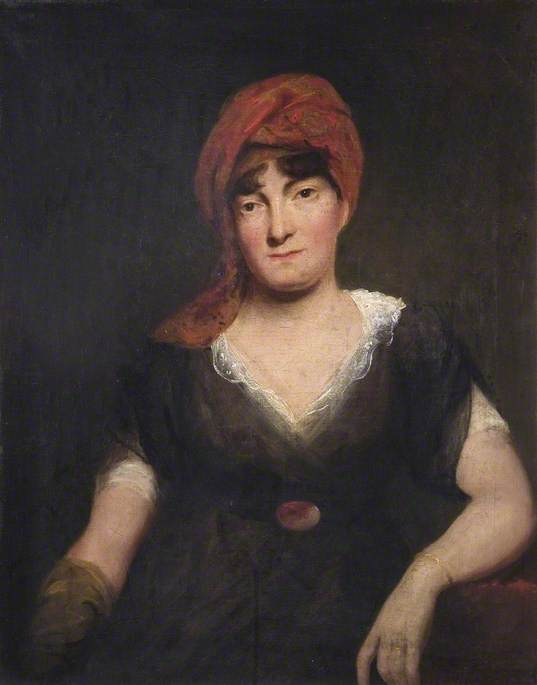
Bertie Greatheed, Priscilla Kemble, 1830, Leamington Spa Art Gallery & Museum

Priscilla Kemble (née Hopkins; 1756 – May 1845) was an English actress. The English actor John Philip Kemble was her third and last husband.

== Family ==
Kemble was born Priscilla Hopkins in 1756, the daughter of a prompter named William Hopkins, who was employed for many years at Drury Lane and his wife the actress Elizabeth Hopkins. Her mother (died September 1801) was a respected actress in David Garrick's company. An elder sister appeared as Miss Hopkins at Drury Lane on 14 November 1771 playing Cupid, a postilion, in A Trip to Scotland; on 19 April 1773 she made "her first appearance on any stage" as Celia in As You Like It; and acted with success for a few seasons, then married a wealthy man, and retired from the stage. She eventually returned to acting, as Mrs. Sharp, in 1779 and 1780.

== Early acting career ==
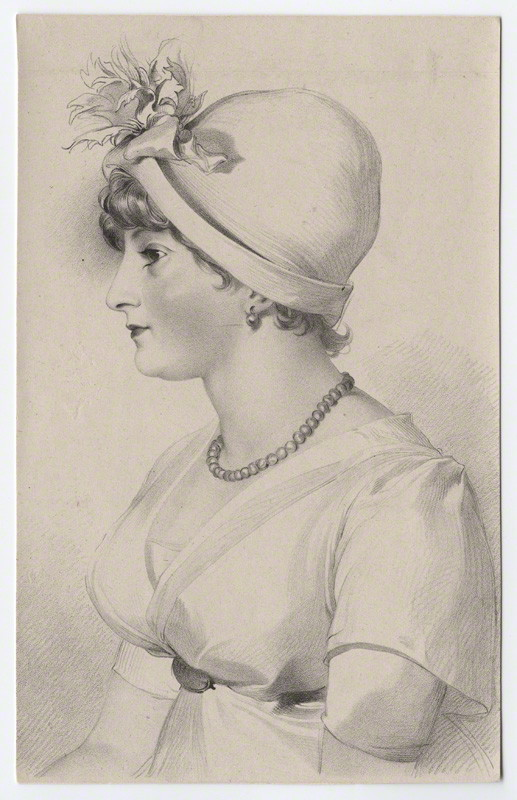
Richard James Lane, after Sir Thomas Lawrence, Priscilla Kemble, 1830

Priscilla Hopkins was first known for being a member of Garrick's company at Drury Lane, playing Mildred in Old City Manners, an adaptation of Eastward Hoe! on 9 November 1775. She had probably been previously seen as Fanny in the Clandestine Marriage on 20 November, and Maria in the Maid of the Oaks on the 28th. On 15 February 1776 she was the original Harriet in Hannah Cowley's The Runaway and on 7 March the original Eliza in Colman's Spleen, or Islington Spa. During the following season she played Sylvia in the Old Bachelor at Drury Lane. Kemble was the original Kitty Sprightly in Isaac Jackman's All the World's a Stage, and on 8 May 1777 the original Maria in the School for Scandal. Other parts followed: Bridget in Every Man in his Humour, Arabella in the Committee, Mademoiselle in the Provoked Wife, and Fanny in the Clandestine Marriage, played for the benefit of the Miss Hopkins's on 1 May 1778. Kemble was a very pretty, piquante was married to William Brereton (1751–1787), an actor of some position, who had played for some years at Drury Lane. Her marriage to Brereton was not a happy one due to a number of reasons.

== Later acting career ==
On 8 October 1778, as Louisa Dudley in the West Indian, she appeared for the first time at Drury Lane as Mrs. Brereton, late Miss P. Hopkins. Her married life was reputable, and she occupied in a satisfactory fashion a secondary part on the stage, playing Lady Constant in The Way to Keep Him, Charlotte in the Gamester, Sylvia in The Double Gallant, Elizabeth (an original part) in Mrs. Cowley's Who's the Dupe? Mariana in the Miser, Perdita, Amanda in the Trip to Scarborough, Fidelia in the Foundling, Angelina in Love Makes a Man. Rose in the Recruiting Officer, Maria in Twelfth Night, Donna Viola (an original part) on 25 November 1786 in Mrs. Cowley's A School for Greybeards, Margaret in A New Way to Pay Old Debts, and many other parts, original and other, chiefly secondary. Brereton, her husband, went in 1785 to Dublin, where he attempted suicide; it is hinted through a passion for Mrs. Siddons. A partial recovery was effected, but he was kept in charge at Hoxton. Brereton died on 17 February 1787 and was buried in Shoreditch churchyard, in which a stone is erected to his memory. His widow appeared at Drury Lane on 12 March 1787 as the original Emily in Holcroft's Seduction. On the opening night of the next season, 20 September 1787, she was Dorinda in the Stratagem. On 8 December 1787 she married John Philip Kemble, and as Mrs. Kemble appeared on 10 December as Lady Anne in Richard III. Hero in Much Ado about Nothing was her next part. She was the original Aurora in Kemble's Panel, and Flora in his Farm House. On 2 December 1788 she was Lady Lambert in the Hypocrite, on 15 January 1790 Sylvia in Two Gentlemen of Verona and on 8 March 1790 the original Valeria in her husband's Love in many Masks. With the company she went to the Haymarket Opera House, where she was, on 20 April 1792, the original Miss Manly in Richardson's Fugitive.

== Personal life ==
Despite being Kemble's wife, important parts including those in which she had won acceptance, were withheld from her. On 23 May 1796 accordingly, as Flavia in Kemble's Celadon and Florimel, or the Happy Counterplot, then first performed, she delivered an address, and retired from acting. She accompanied her husband in his travels after his retirement, and after his death retired to Leamington. She was popular and retained her faculties until she died in May 1845 aged 90. Since she had no children, her property and possessions went to members of the Kemble and Siddons family. Genest speaks of her as pretty, but not very capable, and says she was seen to perform the best in parts like Maria in the School for Scandal.

== General and cited references ==
Attribution

- This article incorporates text from a publication now in the public domain: Knight, John Joseph (1892). "Kemble, Priscilla". In Lee, Sidney (ed.). Dictionary of National Biography. Vol. 30. London: Smith, Elder & Co.
