= Wrighten =

Wrighten is a surname. Notable people with the surname include:

- Charlotte Wrighten Placide (1776–1823), American actress and opera singer
- James Wrighten (1745–1793), English actor
- Mary Ann Wrighten (1751–1796), English singer, actress, and composer

== See also ==
- Wright
