= The Double Deception =

1779 play

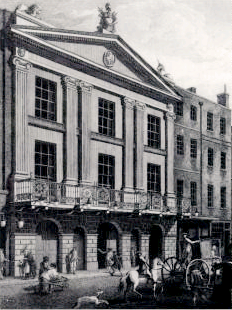
- Drury Lane Theatre, 1775
- Original language: English
- Written by: Elizabeth Richardson
- Genre: Comedy

Premiere
- Date: 28 April 1779
- Place: Theatre Royal, Drury Lane, London

The Double Deception is a 1779 comedy play by the British writer Elizabeth Richardson. It premiered at the Theatre Royal, Drury Lane on 28 April 1779, and was her only play. The original cast included James William Dodd as Flippant, William Parsons as Welford, James Aickin as Fairgrove, Robert Baddeley as Rudely, Francis Godolphin Waldron as Robin, John Palmer as Sir Henry Varnish, Elizabeth Farren as Louisa Freemore, Elizabeth Hopkins as Lady Varnish, Priscilla Brereton as Sophia Welford, Jane Pope as Kitty.

== Bibliography ==
- DeRochi, Jack E. & Ennis Daniel James (ed.) Richard Brinsley Sheridan: The Impresario in Political and Cultural Context. Rowman & Littlefield, 2013.
- Greene, John C. Theatre in Dublin, 1745-1820: A Calendar of Performances, Volume 6. Lexington Books, 2011.
- Nicoll, Allardyce. A History of English Drama 1660–1900: Volume III. Cambridge University Press, 2009.
- Hogan, C.B (ed.) The London Stage, 1660–1800: Volume V. Southern Illinois University Press, 1968.
