= Elizabeth Hopkins =

English stage actress

Elizabeth Hopkins (1731–1801) was an English stage actress of the eighteenth century. Born as Elizabeth Barton to a publican in York, she married the actor William Hopkins in 1753. and he introduced her to the stage. They acted together in the provinces and then in Edinburgh where she was original Anna in John Home's Douglas in 1756. She then went to Dublin to perform at the Smock Alley Theatre and elsewhere, although she was at one point dismissed by the company by Thomas Sheridan. When her husband was appointed as prompter at the Theatre Royal, Drury Lane in London she joined the company there, making her first appearance there in 1761. For several decades she was an integral part of the Drury Lane company, occasionally appearing elsewhere in the summer including at Richmond and the Theatre Royal, Haymarket. She transitioned in the 1780s from the younger, tragic roles she had played to older character parts such as dowagers Her final appearance was at the Haymarket in 1796. The actress Priscilla Kemble, wife of John Philip Kemble, was her daughter.

== Selected roles ==
- Anna in Douglas by John Home (1756)
- Lady Rusport in The West Indian by Richard Cumberland (1771)
- Mrs Bridgemore in The Fashionable Lover by Richard Cumberland (1772)
- Lady Rachel Mildew in The School for Wives by Hugh Kelly (1773)
- Mrs Stapleton in The Choleric Man by Richard Cumberland (1774)
- Dinah in The Runaway by Hannah Cowley (1776)
- Lady Varnish in The Double Deception by Elizabeth Richardson (1779)
- Lady Blaze in The School for Vanity by Samuel Jackson Pratt (1783)
- Theodosia in The Box-Lobby Challenge by Richard Cumberland (1794)
- Mrs Ratcliff in The Jew by Richard Cumberland (1794)
- Mrs Hamford in The Wedding Day by Elizabeth Inchbald (1794)
- Benedicta in Don Pedro by Richard Cumberland (1796)

== Bibliography ==
- Highfill, Philip H, Burnim, Kalman A. & Langhans, Edward A. A Biographical Dictionary of Actors, Volume 7, Habgood to Houbert: Actresses, Musicians, Dancers, Managers, and Other Stage Personnel in London, 1660–1800. SIU Press, 1982.
- Straub, Kristina, G. Anderson, Misty and O'Quinn, Daniel . The Routledge Anthology of Restoration and Eighteenth-Century Drama. Taylor & Francis, 2017.
- Van Lennep, W. The London Stage, 1660–1800: Volume One, 1660–1700. Southern Illinois University Press, 1960.
