= Don Pedro (play) =

1796 play

- Cast list in published version of play.
- Written by: Richard Cumberland
- Original language: English
- Genre: London
- Setting: Segovia, Spain

Premiere
- Date premiered: 23 July 1796
- Place premiered: Theatre Royal, Haymarket, London

Don Pedro is a tragic play by the British writer Richard Cumberland. It was first staged at the Theatre Royal, Haymarket in London on 23 July 1796. The original cast included James Aickin as Count Valdesoto, Charles Kemble as Henrique, John Palmer as Pedro De Rascifiria, John Bannister as Basco de Robeldondo, Richard Suett as Nicolas Sassenigo, Thomas Caulfield as Tayo, George Wathen as Roca, Robert Palmer as Cerbero and Elizabeth Kemble as Celestina, Sarah Harlowe as Mariguita, Maria Kemble as Cattania and Elizabeth Hopkins as Benedicta. The epilogue was written by George Colman the Younger.

== Bibliography ==
- Greene, John C. Theatre in Dublin, 1745-1820: A Calendar of Performances, Volume 6. Lexington Books, 2011.
- Mudford, William. The Life of Richard Cumberland. Sherwood, Neely & Jones, 1812.
- Nicoll, Allardyce. A History of English Drama 1660-1900. Volume III: Late Eighteenth Century Drama. Cambridge University Press, 1952.
- Watson, George. The New Cambridge Bibliography of English Literature: Volume 2, 1660-1800. Cambridge University Press, 1971.
