= William Brereton (actor) =

English stage actor

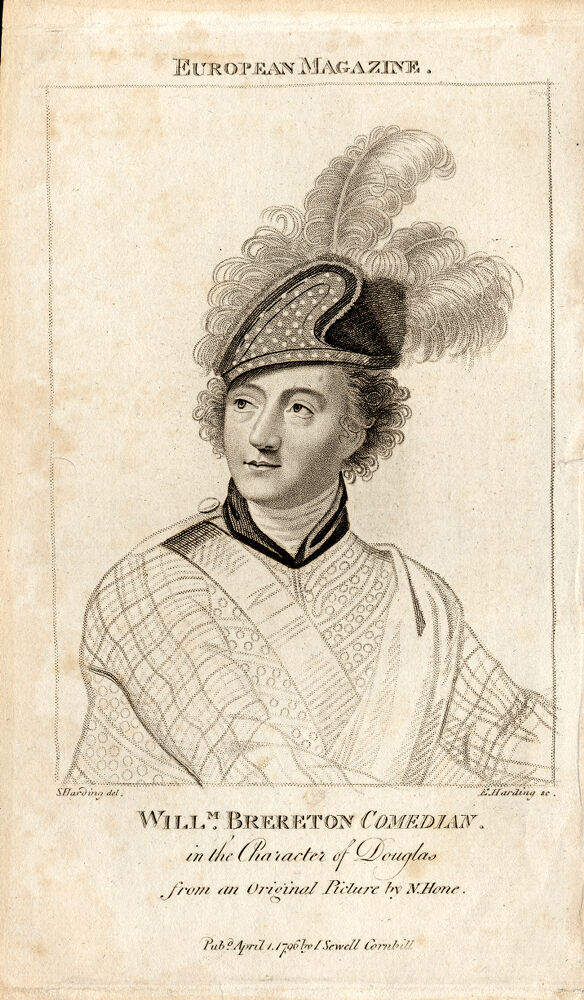
Brereton in the title role of Douglas.

William Brereton (c. 1751–1787) was an English stage actor. He was a member of the company of the Theatre Royal, Drury Lane for eighteen years, under the management of David Garrick and subsequently Richard Brinsley Sheridan. He was born in Bath, the son of William Brereton who was master of ceremonies in the spa town. He made his Drury Lane debut in the title role of Douglas by John Home in 1768. Weakened by alcoholism and mental instability, he died in an asylum in Hoxton in 1787. He was married to the actress Priscilla Brereton, who later married John Philip Kemble. He was said to have had an unrequited passion for Sarah Siddons which contributed to his mental decline.

== Selected roles ==
- Romeo in The Jubilee by David Garrick (1769)
- Mendoza in Braganza by Robert Jephson (1775)
- Colonel Tivy in Bon Ton by David Garrick (1775)
- Prince Walteof in The Battle of Hastings by Richard Cumberland (1778)
- Valentine Onslow in The School for Vanity by Samuel Jackson Pratt (1783)
- Sir Charles Seymour in The Runaway by Hannah Cowley (1786)

== Bibliography ==
- Bloom Edward A. & Bloom, Lilian D (ed.) The Piozzi Letters: 1817-1821. University of Delaware Press, 1989.
- Burnim, Kalman A. & Highfill, Philip H. John Bell, Patron of British Theatrical Portraiture: A Catalog of the Theatrical Portraits in His Editions of Bell's Shakespeare and Bell's British Theatre. SIU Press, 1998.
