= Who's the Dupe? =

1779 play

- Original language: English
- Written by: Hannah Cowley
- Genre: Comedy
- Setting: London, present day

Premiere
- Date: 10 April 1779
- Place: Theatre Royal, Drury Lane, London

Who's the Dupe? is a 1779 comedy play by the British writer Hannah Cowley. A two-act farcical afterpiece, it premiered at the Theatre Royal, Drury Lane in London on 10 April 1779. The original cast included William Parsons as Doiley, James Aickin as Sandford, John Palmer as Granger, Thomas King as Gradus, Priscilla Brereton as Elizabeth and Mary Ann Wrighten as Charlotte. The Irish premiere was at the Smock Alley Theatre in Dublin on 8 February 1791. Cowley had enjoyed success with her debut play The Runaway and followed it with the tragedy Albina and this farce. It became one of her most popular works.

== Bibliography ==
- Escott, Angela. The Celebrated Hannah Cowley: Experiments in Dramatic Genre, 1776–1794. Routledge, 2015.
- Greene, John C. Theatre in Dublin, 1745-1820: A Calendar of Performances, Volume 6. Lexington Books, 2011.
- Nicoll, Allardyce. A History of English Drama 1660–1900: Volume III. Cambridge University Press, 2009.
- Hogan, C.B (ed.) The London Stage, 1660–1800: Volume V. Southern Illinois University Press, 1968.
