= The Conspiracy =

The Conspiracy may refer to:

Literature

- The Conspiracy (play), a 1796 work by Robert Jephson
- The Conspiracy (Animorphs), a 1999 novel by K. A. Applegate

Film

- The Conspiracy (1916 film), a film directed by Henry MacRae, starring Harry Carey
- The Conspiracy (2012 film), a film directed by Christopher MacBride, starring Aaron Poole and James Gilbert
- XIII: The Conspiracy, a 2008 film directed by Duane Clark, starring Val Kilmer and Stephen Dorff

Music

- "The Conspiracy", a song by the Cat Empire, from their live EP Live @ Adelphia
