= The Belle's Stratagem =

1780 play by Hannah Cowley

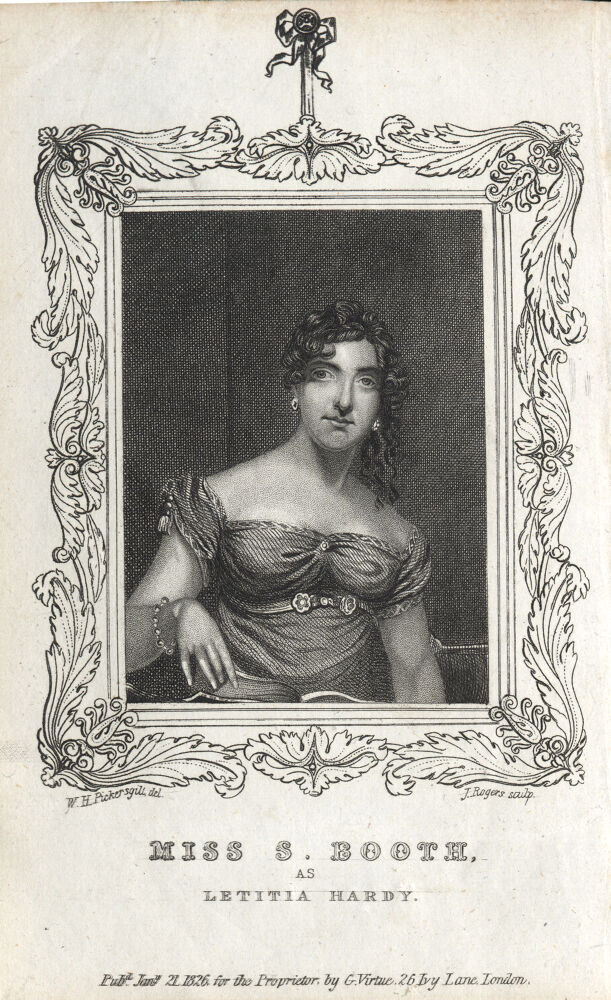
- Sarah Booth in the role of Letitia Hardy, 1826
- Original language: English
- Written by: Hannah Cowley
- Genre: Comedy
- Setting: London, present day

Premiere
- Date: 22 February 1780
- Place: Theatre Royal, Drury Lane, London

The Belle's Stratagem is a romantic comedy of manners, the most successful work of its playwright, Hannah Cowley. It received its premiere on 22 February 1780, filling the 2,000-seat Drury Lane theatre. The play became a major hit of the season, with Queen Charlotte enjoying it so much that she decreed it be performed for the royal family once a season for several years. Its title comes from George Farquhar's play The Beaux' Stratagem.

== Synopsis ==
The play's double plotline concerns the romance between Letitia Hardy and Doricourt, as well as the relationship between Sir George Touchwood and his wife, Lady Frances Touchwood. The story comes to a dénouement at the masquerade ball of the last act. As described by the press office of the Oregon Shakespeare Festival,

"Set in 1780s London, The Belle's Stratagem is the tale of Letitia Hardy, promised to the charming Doricourt whom she hasn't seen since childhood. Her plan to enchant him with her wit and charm is turned upside-down when she discovers she's fallen madly in love with him, and he seems quite unmoved by her. Desiring to marry a man who adores her equally, she plans a bold deception--to have love as she likes it. Interwoven with Letitia's scheme to trick Doricourt into passion is the story of the newly married Touchwoods. Sir George is wildly jealous of his lovely country-bred wife and his fear of her being corrupted by fashionable life encourages plots by his acquaintance to turn Lady Frances into a fine lady in order to spite Sir George."

The role of the ingenue heroine, Letitia Hardy, proved to be a successful vehicle in Paris for Harriet Smithson, who infatuated Hector Berlioz. It was also "a favorite role" for Ellen Terry, who was both photographed and engraved in her character's costume.

Characters include:

- Kitty Willis
- Tony
- Saville
- Courtall
- Doricourt
- Flutter
- Villers
- Mrs. Racket
- Letitia Hardy
- Old Hardy
- Sir George Touchwood
- Miss Ogle
- Lady Frances Touchwood

== Author ==
In 1743, Hannah Cowley was born in Tiverton, Devon. Her father, Phillip Parkhouse, was an educated bookseller, which helped develop Cowley's literary interest and skill. In 1772, she married Thomas Cowley, a bookseller's son. Most female playwrights of the time period were either unmarried or abandoned playwriting shortly after their marriage. However, Thomas's small earnings as a writer allowed her to try her hand at playwriting. Cowley's interest in playwriting was allegedly sparked by a “dull night out at the theatre”; she decided she could write a better play than the one she had just watched, so shortly after, she wrote The Runaway. Cowely's first play The Runaway debuted in February 1776. With the help of David Garrick, The Runaway became a huge success and earned Cowley over 500 pounds. The Runaway was Garrick's last production before he retired, and Cowley had “lost the ‘patron’ to whom her ‘heart [was] devoted’”. Cowley’s next manager, Richard Sheridan, would not be as kind. While he delayed and rejected her ideas, Cowley saw her rival, Hannah More, become popular with plays that strongly resembled Cowley’s works. The two quickly began a very public “paper war” After the Hannah More scandal, Cowley returned her focus to playwriting, and in February 1780 The Belle’s Stratagem, Cowley's most popular play premiered.

== Influence ==
The Belle's Stratagem still remains Hannah Cowley's most popular play to date, and is very "before her time" in writing strong and intelligent female characters. During its stage life thirty editions were published.

In The Belle’s Stratagem, the topic of social injustices in marriage is blatant, the play mostly focusing on how women are supposed to be docile in most social settings. To break up this social narrative, Cowley creates female characters who are sharp and witty, women who know what they want and are determined to get it. Around the time of this play, marriage began to change and the idea of marrying for love instead of duty was more prominent. Cowley uses this play to comment on social constructs of marriage, and how romantic love is becoming accepted and sought after by women looking towards marriage. Cowley sets the audience up to ask big questions about equality in marriage, because if Letitia is smart enough to trick Doricourt, she should also be trusted with decision making within the marriage.

Cowley presents her female characters as virtuous and smart. She uses characters who are high in social status, and she does not often make people the butt of jokes. Her comedic formula is witty and reaches for high ideals, and this can be shown in how she writes her female characters. Letitia is brilliant. She comes up with a plot to prove to her fiancé that she can be as flirtatious as the European women, as well as be virtuous when doing so. She warns Doricourt to “beware of imprudent curiosity” when he tells her to take off her mask so it is obvious Letitia does not pine for his affection, because she knows she does not need to. She also does not sit back and let her fiancé set her aside. She does something about it, which is very admirable for a female character of this time period.

== Performance history ==
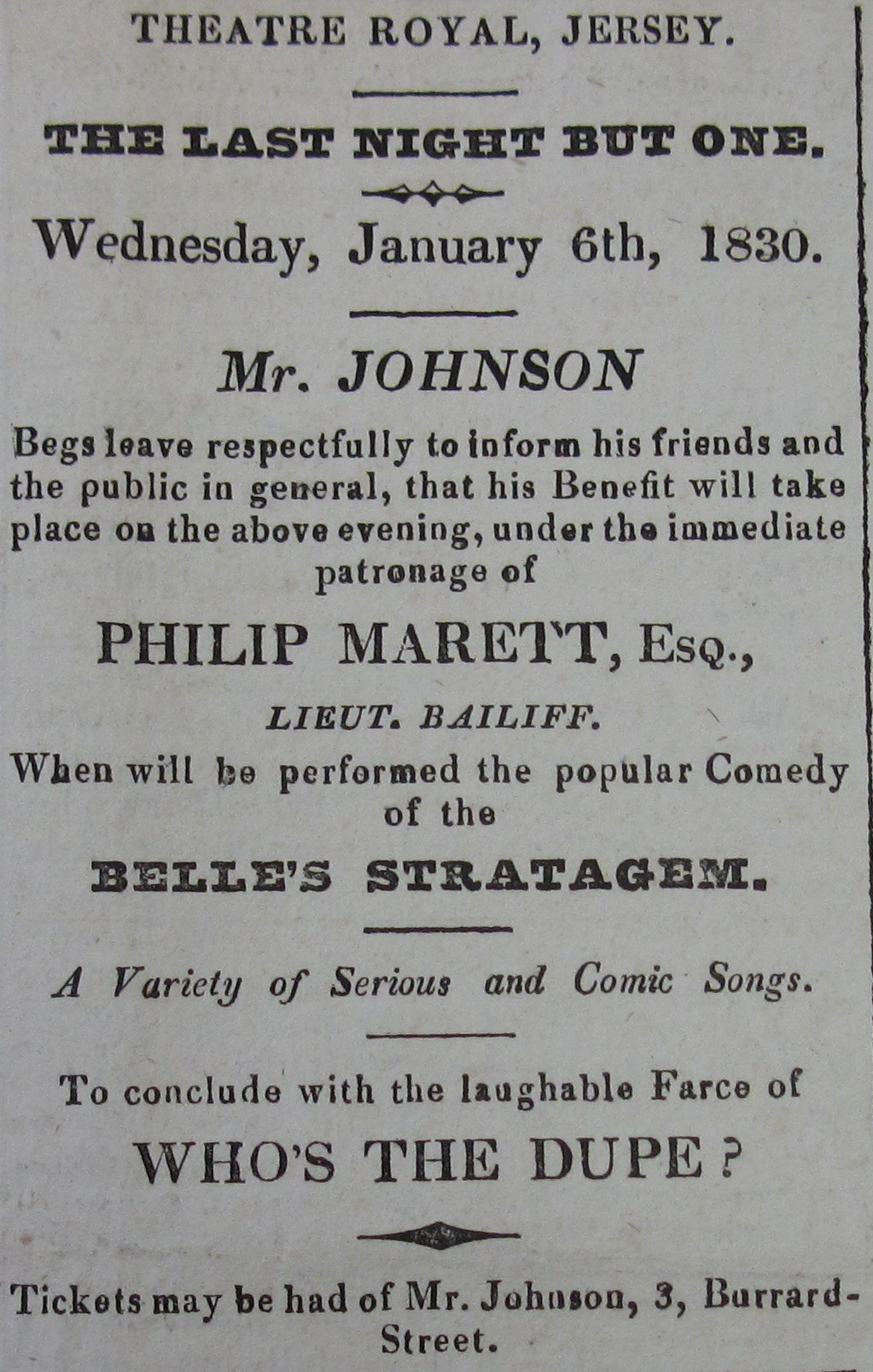
Advertisement for a performance of The Belle's Stratagem in Jersey on 6 January 1830

The original London cast featured William Thomas Lewis as Doricourt, John Quick as Hardy, Charles Lee Lewes as Flutter, Richard Wroughton as Sir George Touchwood, Francis Aickin as Saville, John Whitfield as Villers, Thomas Robson as Courtall, James Thompson as First Gentleman, Ralph Wewitzer as French Servant, James Fearon as Porter, Elizabeth Younge as Letitia Hardy, Isabella Mattocks as Mrs Racket, Elizabeth Hartley as Lady Frances Touchwood and Mary Morton as Miss Ogle.

Despite immense popularity in its time, The Belle's Stratagem was withdrawn by Richard Brinsley Sheridan when he took over management of Drury Lane from Garrick. Although presented a number of times during the 19th century in both England and the United States, it was rarely performed by major theaters throughout recent history.

It was revived in an off-Broadway showcase production by Prospect Theater Company in New York City in 2003, in a major production by the Oregon Shakespeare Festival in 2005, and in 2011 received its first British production since 1888. It was presented at Southwark Playhouse, London, by Red Handed Theatre Company, directed by Jessica Swale.

Tony Cownie's adaptation, which re-sets the play in Enlightenment Edinburgh during the development of the city's New Town, was staged by the Lyceum Theatre Company in February 2018.
