= Maria Bland =

British singer

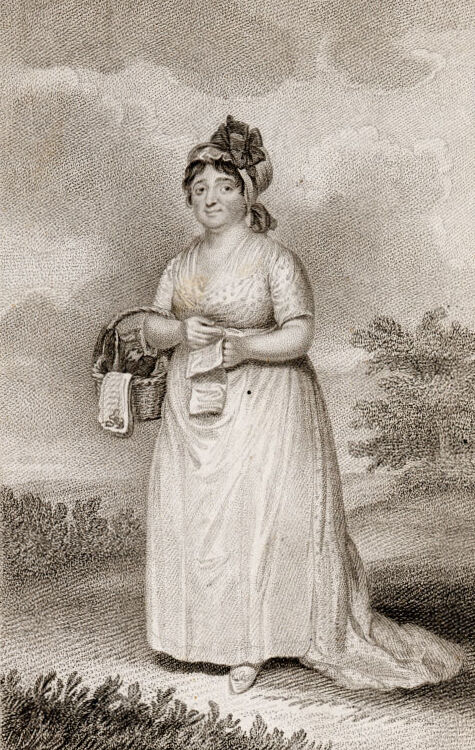
Maria Bland as Sally Shamrock in "The Shipwreck", 1807.

Maria Theresa Bland (née Romanzini; 1769–1838), known professionally as Mrs. Bland, was a British singer who enjoyed high popularity in the London theatre during the last decade of the 18th century and the first two decades of the 19th century.

== Life ==
Maria Theresa Romanzini was born in 1769, the daughter of Italian Jews. Her parents came to London soon after their daughter's birth.

Romanzini's vocal talent developed at a very early age, and in the spring of 1773, after a hairdresser at the Royal Circus named Mr. Cady recognized Romanzini's talents, her parents obtained an engagement for their child at Hughes's Riding School. After singing at the Royal Circus she was engaged by Richard Daly for the Dublin Theatre, where she sang with great success.

In 1782, on the retirement of Mary Ann Wrighten, she was engaged at Drury Lane Theatre to take Wrighten's parts, which were those known as "singing chambermaids".

Romanzini's first appearance at Drury Lane took place on 24 October 1786, when she played Antonio in an English version of Grétry's Richard Coeur-de-lion. In 1789 she went to Liverpool, and sang there with such success, both on the stage and at concerts, that she refused to return to Drury Lane unless her salary were raised. The management declined to grant her request, and after waiting a few weeks, she came back to London and resumed her place at Drury Lane.

Mrs. Bland remained attached to the Drury Lane company for the greater part of her life, but she also sang at the Haymarket Theatre under Colman's management, where her first appearance took place in 1791, as Wowski in Samuel Arnold's comic opera, Inkle and Yarico. She also sang for several seasons at Vauxhall Gardens.

In 1824, she began to exhibit symptoms of cognitive decline, which developed into severe depression or "melancholy".

On 5 July 1824 a performance was given for her benefit at Drury Lane, which produced, together with a public subscription, about £800 (equivalent to £75,937 in 2025). The money was handed over to Lord Egremont, who allowed her an annuity of £80. She lived for the rest of her life under the charge of a caregiver with a family named Western, at the Broadway, Westminster, where she died due to sudden apoplexy on 15 January 1838. She was buried at St Margaret's in Westminster on 25 January 1838.

== Critical assessment ==
Bland's voice was a mezzo-soprano "of sweet quality." While her vocal strength was limited, she was known as a talented singer of English ballads. In person she was described as short with a dark hair and complexion, but her acting was described as "very bright and vivacious."

In addition to singing, she played the piano, harp, and guitar.

== Family ==
On 21 October 1790 she married George Bland, a minor actor and a brother of Dorothea Jordan. George, whom it was said that she had treated badly, left her and went to America, where he died in 1807. She lived for more than a decade with the English actor Thomas Caulfield before he also left for America.

Mrs. Bland had had two sons: Charles, a tenor singer, who was the original Oberon in Weber's opera, and James, a bass, who began life as an opera singer, but later better known as an actor of burlesque, and who died at the Strand Theatre on 17 July 1861.
