= The Runaway (play) =

1776 play

- Original language: English
- Written by: Hannah Cowley
- Genre: Comedy
- Setting: England, present day

Premiere
- Date: 15 February 1776
- Place: Theatre Royal, Drury Lane, London

The Runaway is a 1776 comedy play by the British writer Hannah Cowley. It premiered at London's Theatre Royal, Drury Lane on 15 February 1776. The original cast included Richard Yates as Mr Hargrave, William Smith as George Hargrave, Robert Bensley as Mr Drummond, William Brereton as Sir Charles Seymour, James Aickin as Mr Morley, William Parsons as Justice, John Palmer as Jarvis, Charles Bannister as First Hunter, Elizabeth Hopkins as Lady Dinah, Elizabeth Younge as Bella, Priscilla Hopkins as Harriet, Sarah Siddons as Emily and Mary Ann Wrighten as Susan. Cowley dedicated the play to David Garrick, the actor-manager of Drury Lane, who wrote the prologue. The action revolves around a country house in England.

== Synopsis ==
George Hargrave, who is home from college, is overjoyed to learn that Emily, the mysterious runaway whom his godfather, Mr. Drummond, has taken in, is the same young lady he fell in love with at a recent masquerade. Meanwhile, George's spirited cousin, Bella, helps George's sister, Harriet, and George's friend Sir Charles fall in love. George's designs are threatened when he learns that his father wants George to marry Lady Dinah, a pretentious older lady who is also very rich. When Emily's father arrives to take Emily back to London, George gives chase and snatches Emily back. Mr. Drummond saves the day by offering the young lovers some of his land so that they can have a fortune of their own.

== Bibliography ==
- Escott, Angela. The Celebrated Hannah Cowley: Experiments in Dramatic Genre, 1776–1794. Routledge, 2015.
- Greene, John C. Theatre in Dublin, 1745-1820: A Calendar of Performances, Volume 6. Lexington Books, 2011.
- Nicoll, Allardyce. A History of English Drama 1660–1900: Volume III. Cambridge University Press, 2009.
- Hogan, C.B (ed.) The London Stage, 1660–1800: Volume V. Southern Illinois University Press, 1968.
