= The Box-Lobby Challenge =

1794 play

- Original language: English
- Written by: Richard Cumberland
- Genre: Comedy
- Setting: London, present day

Premiere
- Date: 22 February 1794
- Place: Theatre Royal, Haymarket

The Box-Lobby Challenge is a comedy play by the British writer Richard Cumberland. It was first staged at the Haymarket Theatre in February 1794. It is a farcical comedy of manners set amongst the working class. The original cast included Thomas Caulfield as George Waterland, William Barrymore as Captain Waterland, James Aickin as Sir Toby Grampus, Richard Suett as Squire Robert, Robert Baddeley as Old Crochet, John Bannister as Jack Crotchet, George Bland as Fulsome Walter Maddocks as Jones, Robert Benson as Joe, Maria Gibbs as Lady Jane Danvers, Sarah Harlowe as Diana Grampus, Charlotte Goodall as Laetitia, Elizabeth Hopkins as Theodosia and Maria De Camp as Lindamira. The prologue was authored by Francis North.

== Bibliography ==
- Mudford, William. The Life of Richard Cumberland. Sherwood, Neely & Jones, 1812.
- Nicoll, Allardyce. A History of English Drama 1660-1900. Volume III: Late Eighteenth Century Drama. Cambridge University Press, 1952.
