= Thomas Caulfield (actor) =

British stage actor

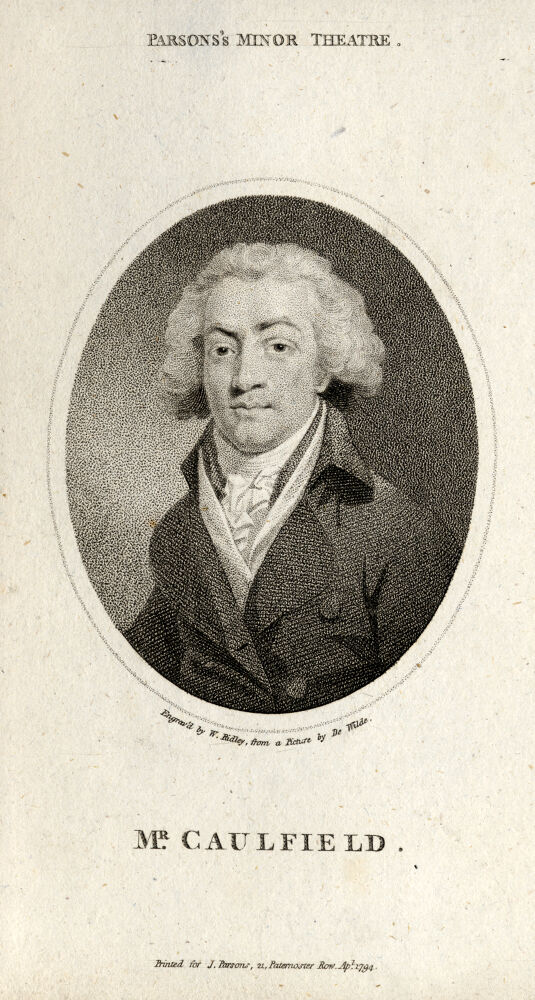
Caulfield in the 1790s.

Thomas Caulfield (1766–1815) was a British stage actor who after a period in London's West End spent the later part of his career in the United States.

He was the son of an engraver from Clerkenwell. Susan Caulfield the mistress of John Burgoyne may have been his sister but she was not his mother nor was Burgoyne his father as some historical sources claimed. After appearing in the provinces, notably at Bath and York, he made his debut for the Drury Lane company in 1791 in The Cave of Trophonius by Prince Hoare. He was a prolific figure in the West End, working at both Drury Lane and the Haymarket. Amongst his roles was that of Uter in Vortigern and Rowena (1796) by William Henry Ireland, a play fraudently claimed to be by Shakespeare. He attracted attention after beginning an affair with Maria Bland, a Drury Lane singer who left her husband actor George Bland, the brother of Dorothea Jordan. He lived with Maria for a decade, during which time he also appeared at the new Theatre Royal, Bath at Buckingham in Richard III.

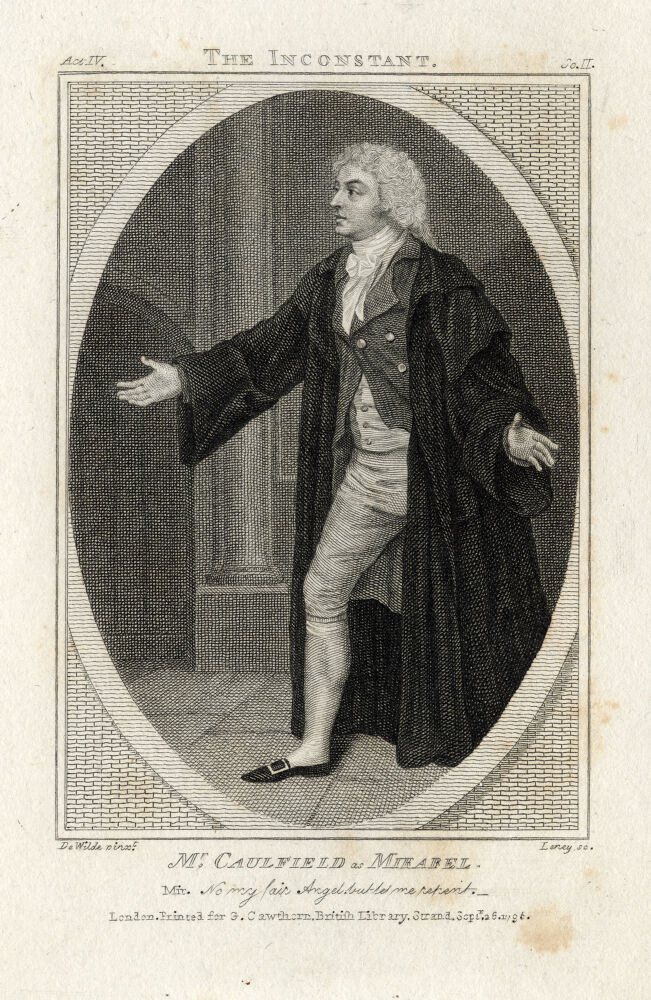
Caulfield in The Inconstant.

In 1807 Caulfield accepted an offer from John Bernard to appear at the Federal Street Theatre in Boston, and left Maria behind in London. He was well received by American audiences in his first appearance, but he was ill-prepared for a role in Rowe's Jane Shore. His lack of professionalism led to his ultimately being dismissed in 1809 after which he appeared in Providence and then in Charleston, South Carolina. He then acted in New York City for several years. He ultimately died at the age of forty nine of overindulgence, although there are conflicting sources for his place of death as either Cincinnati or Kentucky. A painting of Caulfield playing Mirable in The Inconstant is owned by the Garrick Club.

== Selected roles ==
- Aletes in The Rival Sisters by Arthur Murphy (1793)
- George Waterland in The Box-Lobby Challenge by Richard Cumberland (1794)
- Naclo in Zorinski by Thomas Morton (1795)
- Ernulf in Edwy and Elgiva by Fanny Burney (1795)
- Nourassin in Almeyda, Queen of Granada by Sophia Lee (1796)
- Tayo in Don Pedro by Richard Cumberland (1796)
- Lentulus in The Conspiracy by Robert Jephson (1796)
- Uter in Vortigern and Rowena by William Henry Ireland (1796)
- George Ivey in The Last of the Family by Richard Cumberland (1797)
- Alguazil in The Inquisitor by Thomas Holcroft (1798)
- Mortimer in Cambro-Britons by James Boaden (1798)
- Almargo in Pizarro by Richard Brinsley Sheridan (1799)
- Grimbald in De Monfort by Joanna Baillie (1800)
- Singleton in The Sailor's Daughter by Richard Cumberland (1804)

== Bibliography ==
- Highfill, Philip H, Burnim, Kalman A. & Langhans, Edward A. A Biographical Dictionary of Actors, Actresses, Musicians, Dancers, Managers and Other Stage Personnel in London, 1660-1800: Cabanel to Cory. SIU Press, 1975.
