= Bon Ton (play) =

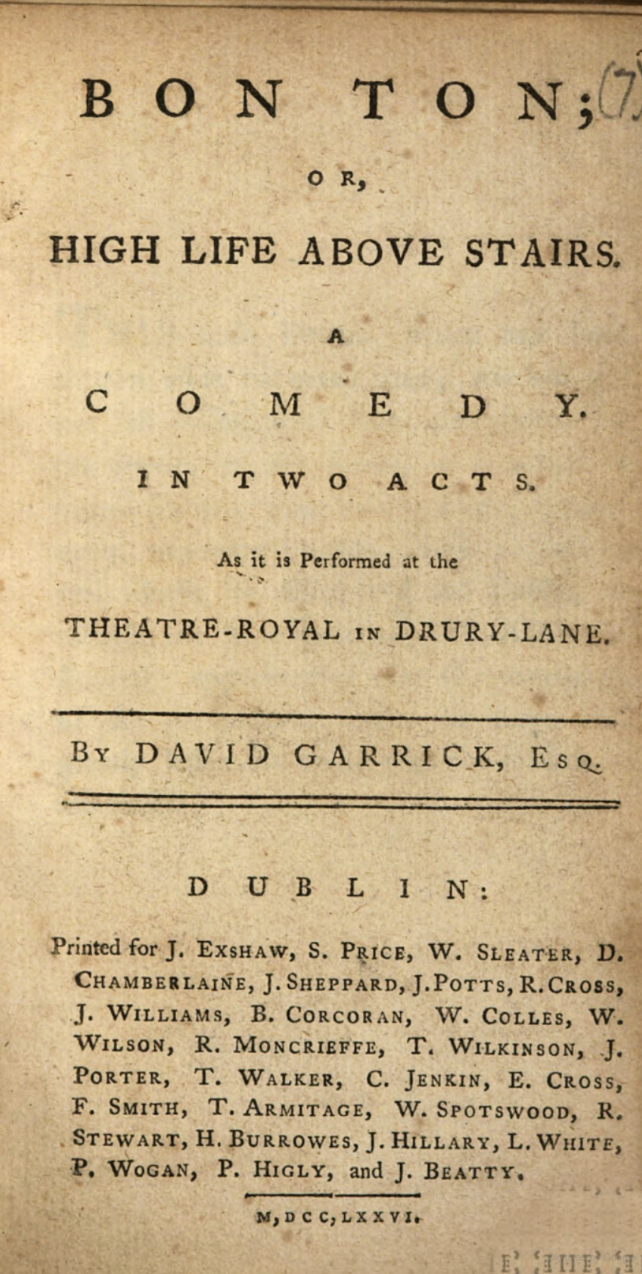
- Bon Ton front cover
- Written by: David Garrick
- Original language: English
- Genre: Comedy
- Setting: London, present day

Premiere
- Date premiered: March 18, 1775
- Place premiered: Theatre Royal, Drury Lane, London

Bon Ton; or, High Life Above Stairs is a comedy act in two acts by David Garrick, first performed at the Theatre Royal, Drury Lane on 18 March 1775. According to Garrick's introductory notice to the play, it had been written many years before. The play stars James William Dodd as Lord Minikin, Thomas King as Sir John Trotley, William Brereton as Colonel Tivy, Phillip Lamash as Jessamy, William Parsons as Davy, William Burton as Mignon, Elizabeth Pope as Lady Minikin, Frances Abington as Miss Lucretia Tittup, and S.J. Platt as Gymp.
