= The Conspiracy (play) =

Play by Robert Jephson

- Original language: English
- Written by: Robert Jephson
- Genre: Tragedy

Premiere
- Date: 15 November 1796
- Place: Theatre Royal, Drury Lane, London

The Conspiracy is a 1796 tragedy by the Irish writer Robert Jephson.

The original cast included John Palmer as Roman emperor Titus, John Philip Kemble as Sextus, William Barrymore as Annius, Charles Kemble as Publius, Thomas Caulfield as Lentulus, Jane Powell as Cornelia and Sarah Siddons as Vitellia.

== Bibliography ==
- Nicoll, Allardyce. A History of English Drama 1660–1900: Volume III. Cambridge University Press, 2009.
- Hogan, C.B (ed.) The London Stage, 1660–1800: Volume V. Southern Illinois University Press, 1968.
