= Alicia Tindal Palmer =

British writer

- Born: 1763; Bath
- Died: 1822 (aged 58–59)

Alicia Tindal Palmer (1763 – 1822) was a British novelist and biographer.

== Life ==
Palmer was born in Bath in 1763. Her father, John, was the actor known as "Gentleman Palmer" and her mother was Hannah Mary Pritchard. Her father's career as an actor was overshadowed by another John Palmer who was no relation whilst his mother had been an actress but her own mother, and Palmer's grandmother, was the more well known Hannah Pritchard.

Palmer's father died in an accident when he was given a mistaken prescription in 1768. Her mother retired from the stage having inherited property from her mother. She remarried a Mr Lloyd.

Palmer's first three volume novel, The Husband and Lover was published in 1809. It was well received, whereas her next novel received an unusual review. Her next story was a moral tale titled The Daughters of Isenberg: a Bavarian Romance and it received a very poor review from John Gifford of the Quarterly Review. Moreover, Gifford claimed that he had been given three pounds as a bribe to give a good review.

Her next book was published in 1811 and her final work was a biography about John Sobieski. It was called Authentic Memoirs of the Life of John Sobieski, King of Poland and it was published in 1815.

Palmer died in 1822.
