= The Spoil'd Child =

British stage play

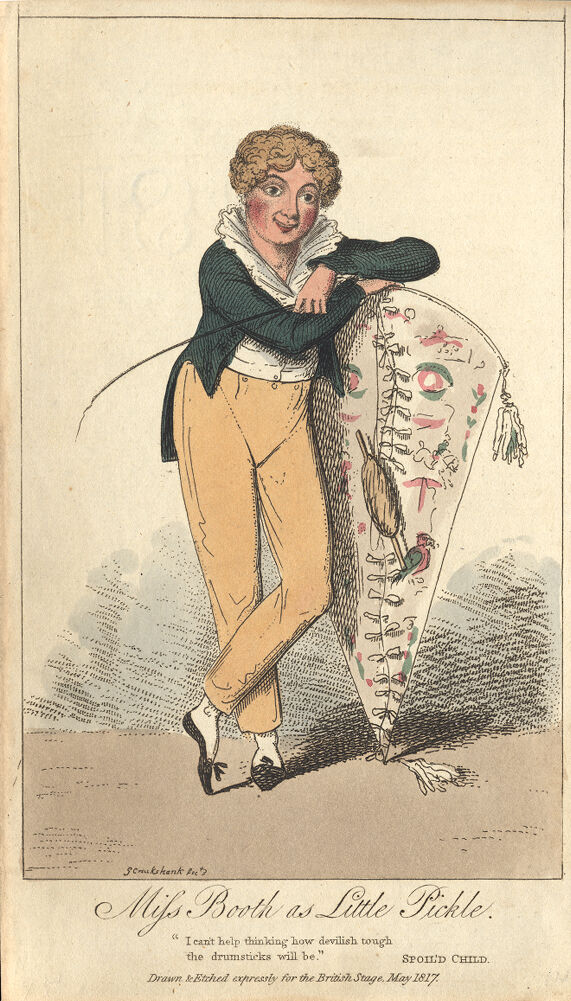
- Sarah Booth playing Little Pickle
- Original language: English
- Written by: Unknown
- Characters: Little Pickle, Tagg
- Genre: Farce

Premiere
- Date: 1790 (London)

The Spoil'd Child (1787) is a late 18th-century British farce that played on stages well into the 19th century. Its authorship is usually but doubtfully attributed to Isaac Bickerstaffe.

The first reported performance of the play is 16 October 1787 at the Theatre Ulverstone. However, more prominently noted in sources is its March 1790 London debut at Drury Lane, with Dorothea Jordan playing the lead role of Little Pickle for which the play was best known.

Bickerstaff scholar Peter Tasch notes that the play was "damned by nearly all the critics wherever it was performed, but stayed in the repertory at first because of the acting of Mrs. Jordan, and later, of other actresses who thought it fun to play Little Pickle. As late as 1873 in America The Spoil'd Child was being performed."
