= Margaret Cuyler =

Cuyler [married name Rice], Margaret (1758–1814), actress and courtesan

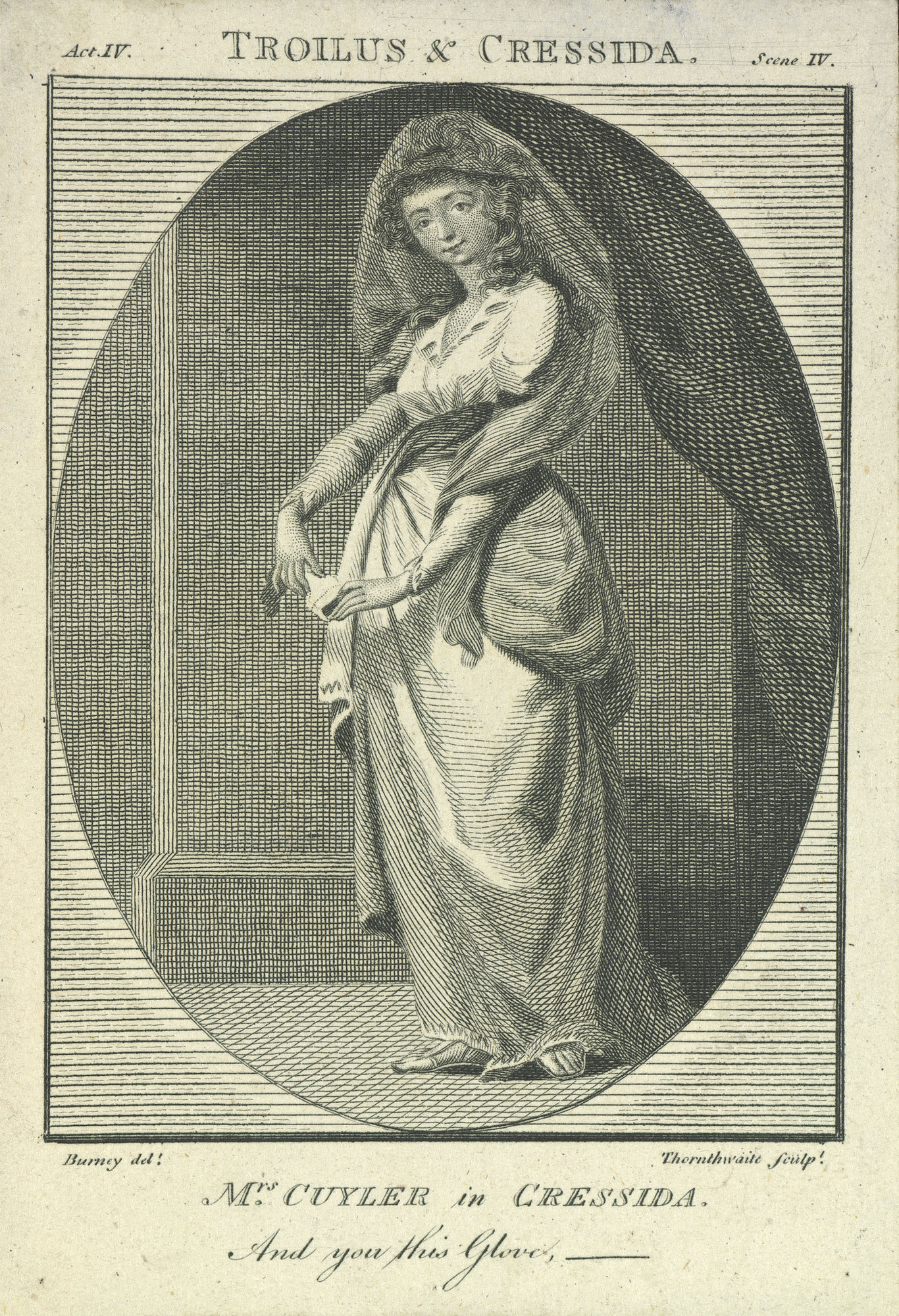
- a 1785 engraving of her as Cressida
- Born: 1758; England
- Died: 14 March 1814 (aged 55–56); Lambeth, London, United Kingdom
- Occupations: Courtesan; actor
- Spouse: Dominic Rice
- Partner: Captain Cuyler
- Children: 1

Margaret Cuyler, Mrs. Rice (1758 – 14 March 1814) was a British actress and courtesan.

== Life ==
According to Fanny Hill and other unreliable sources, Margaret's father would become a lieutenant colonel in the Army and the playmate of a princess. She did bear a child for Captain Cuyler whose name she took before he went off to soldier in America with the 46th foot. She became the partner of a Major.

On 4 January 1777, she made her debut as an actress when she appeared at Drury Lane. Richard Brinsley Sheridan is assumed to be her patron as she had been his mistress. She played Miranda in The Tempest. It was said that she married Dominic Rice of Gray's Inn on 21 February 1778 but she does not appear to be referred to as a wife after this date but still a courtesan. For four years she was kept very well at a house in St Albans Street during which she did not appear at the Drury Lane Theatre. She was not rated as a good actress but she was said to have a great appearance. Her manager George Colman the Younger described her as an "Irish Venus without the Graces" and he obtained for her the role of Miss Mortimer in Harriet Lee's The Chapter of Accidents. Until 1809 she found work at the major theatres during the summer. In 1783, her "gracefully elegant form was exhibited to the utmost advantage" when she appeared in a masquerade at which the Prince of Wales was present.

In 1785 a J Thornthwaite engraving was published of her as Cressida in the Shakespeare Play. It was based on a painting by E.F. Burney although one source says that the play was never performed then. In the 1789-90 season, she was paid by Drury Lane but she appeared only once.

Cuyler had to resort to charity from the Drury Lane Actors' Fund in 1808 and when she died in Lambeth in 1814 she had so little money that it is presumed that actors who remembered her paid for her funeral.
