= James Wrighten =

English actor

James Wrighten (b. 1745 – d. 1793) was an English actor. He trained to work as a copperplate printer, but left that occupation for the stage. He moved from Birmingham to London and made his debut at Theatre Royal, Drury Lane on 21 February 1779. He afterwards acted in numerous roles at the theatre until 1793, beginning work as a prompter in 1786.

Wrighten married prominent actress and singer Mary Ann Wrighten née Matthews in Birmingham in about 1769 and the couple moved to London to work in theatre. They had two daughters, Mary and Charlotte, maintaining a stormy relationship. They divorced in a public scandal that was widely covered in the press, after which Mary Ann Wrighten took her daughters and moved to the United States to pursue a career in theatre there. Wrighten also had a daughter by another marriage. He died in London at the age of 48.
