= Sarah Booth =

English actress

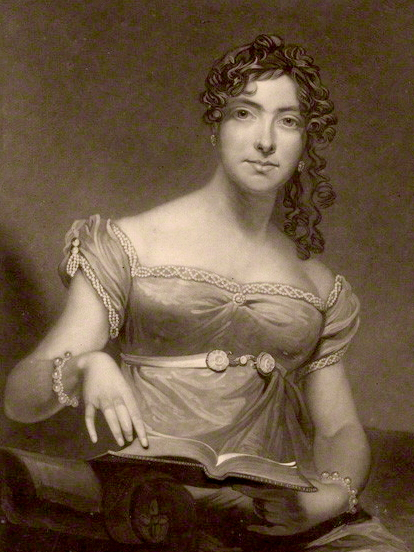
- Born: Sarah Booth; 1793; Birmingham, England, Great Britain
- Died: 30 December 1867 (aged 73–74)
- Occupation: Stage acting

Sarah Booth (1793 – 30 December 1867) was an English actress.

== Personal life ==
Sarah Booth was born in Birmingham, England in 1793. She was related to Barton Booth. She was discovered in Manchester, England as a dancer, alongside her sister, around 1804. She died in 1867 after a long retirement from performing.

== Work ==
She was managed by a promoter named Macready who worked for the Manchester Theatre. She performed as a prince in the play King John. She moved to Doncaster, where she performed in the play Deserts of Siberia (also called The Exile) as Alexina. She was heard of by the manager of the Surrey Theatre, Robert William Elliston. She performed in London, England for the first time in 1810, in a burletta alongside Elliston. That same year, on 23 November, she debuted at the Royal Opera House, playing Amanthis in a play titled Child of Nature. She performed at Covent Garden many times, performing in Miller and his Men, The Dog of Montarges, and Little Pickle, among others. She retired briefly and returned to perform in King Lear, alongside Junius Brutus Booth, as Cordelia. Between 1821 and 1822 she performed in plays at the Haymarket Theatre and the Adelphi Theatre. She appeared at the Georgian Wisbech Theatre (now the Angles Theatre) in May 1827 in the role of Juliet in Shakespeare's play Romeo and Juliet and also at Peterborough on Saturday 23 June, then on Monday 25th, in the parts of Rosalind in As You Like It and as the Romp in The Romp.

She was described as "small in stature, nervous, with hair inclining to red", which led her to being often cast as a young woman, such as Cordelia or Juliet. She occasionally used the stage name Sally Booth.
