= Isaac Jackman =

- Born: Dublin, Ireland
- Occupation: Playwright

Isaac Jackman (fl. 1795) was an Irish journalist and dramatist.

== Life ==
Born around the middle of the 18th century in Dublin, Jackman practised as an attorney there. He ultimately moved to London and wrote for the stage. He seems to be one of the pair young Irishmen who edited The Morning Post for a few years between 1786 and 1795, and involved the printer and proprietor in several libel cases.

== Works ==
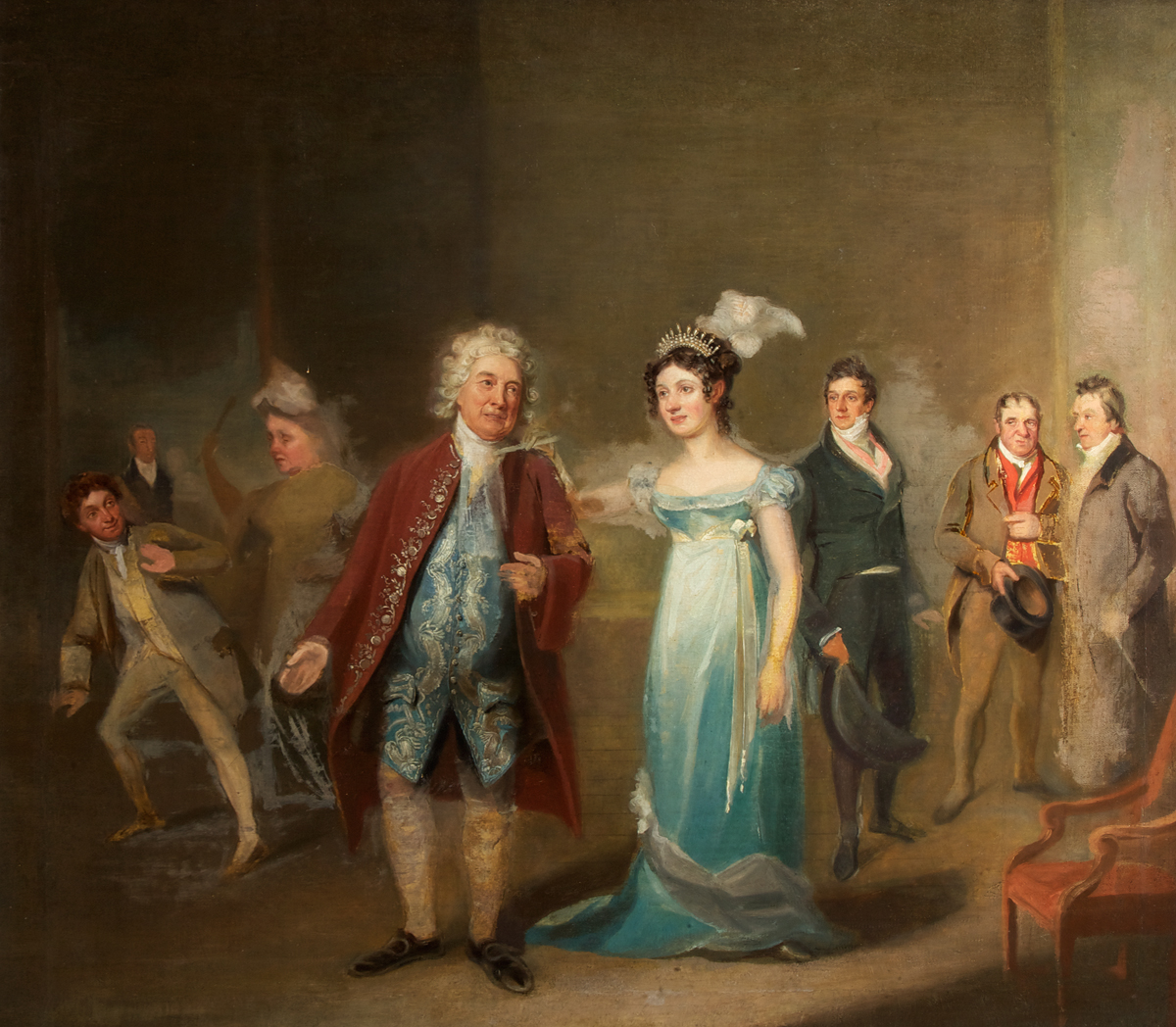
Scene from All the World's a Stage

Jackman's Milesian, a comic opera, on its production at Drury Lane on 20 March 1777, met with an indifferent reception. It was published in 1777. All the World's a Stage, a farce by Jackman in two acts, in prose, was first performed at Drury Lane, on 7 April 1777, and was frequently revived. It was printed in 1777, and reprinted in John Bell's British Theatre and other collections.

The Divorce, a farce, was produced at Drury Lane, opening on 10 November 1781. It was well received and later twice revived; it was printed in 1781. Hero and Leander, a burletta by Jackman (in two acts, prose and verse), was produced at the Royalty Theatre, Goodman's Fields, in 1787. Jackman prefixed a long dedication to Phillips Glover of Wispington, Lincolnshire, in the form of a letter on "Royal and Royalty Theatres": it purported to prove the illegality of the opposition of the existing theatres to one just opened by John Palmer in Wellclose Square, Tower Hamlets.

== Notes ==
Attribution

This article incorporates text from a publication now in the public domain: Lee, Sidney, ed. (1892). "Jackman, Isaac". Dictionary of National Biography. Vol. 29. London: Smith, Elder & Co.
