= John Abercrombie (horticulturist) =

Scottish horticulturist (1726–1806)

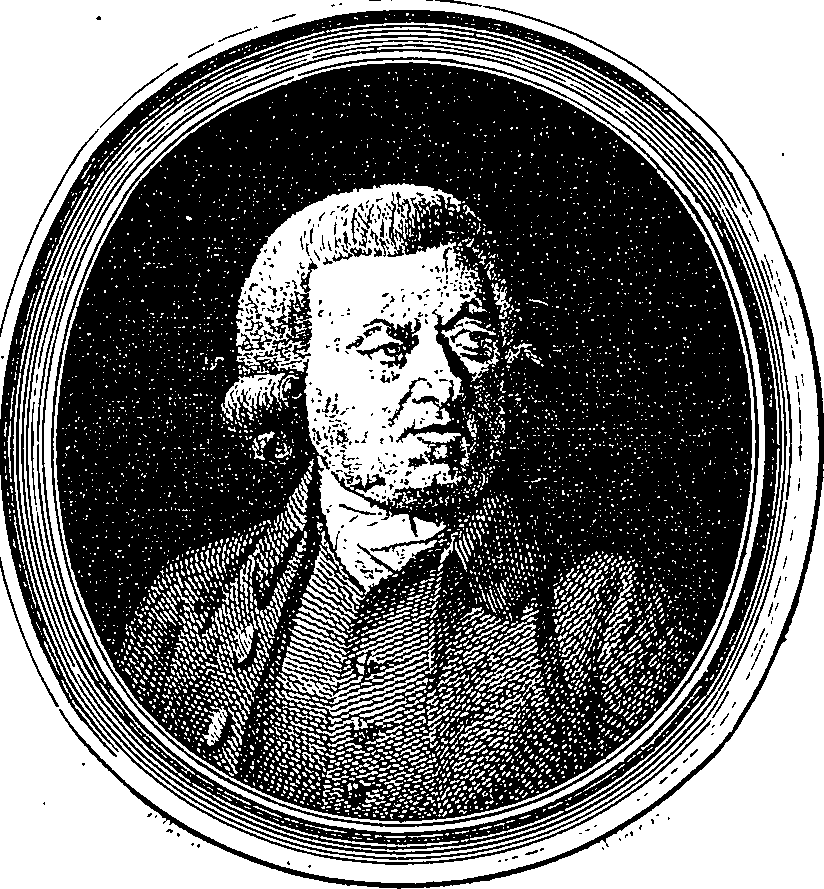
- Picture of Abercrombie from The propagation and botanical arrangements of plants and trees, 1784
- Born: 1726; Edinburgh
- Died: 2 May 1806 (aged 79–80)
- Occupation: Horticulturist
- Notable work: Every Man His Own Gardener

John Abercrombie (1726 – 2 May 1806) was a Scottish horticulturist important to renovating garden techniques. He is noted for the book Every Man His Own Gardener (1767), which he co-wrote with Thomas Mawe.

== Biography ==
Abercrombie was born in Edinburgh. As a young man Abercrombie was employed at the Royal Gardens at Kew, and at Leicester House; and later set up a successful market gardening business in Hackney and later at Tottenham. He wrote a number of works on gardening.

For the last 20 years of his life, Abercrombie was a heavy consumer of tea and a vegetarian. He smoked his pipe for six hours a day and stated that tea and tobacco were promoters of his health. He died from injuries obtained from an accident.

== Selected writings ==
- The Universal Gardener and Botanist; or, a General Dictionary of Gardening and Botany (1778)
- The Garden Mushroom (1779)
- The British Fruit Gardener; and Art of Pruning (1779)
- A General System of Trees and Shrubs (ca. 1780)
- Every Man His Own Gardener, 9th edition (1782)
