= George Bland (actor) =

Irish stage actor

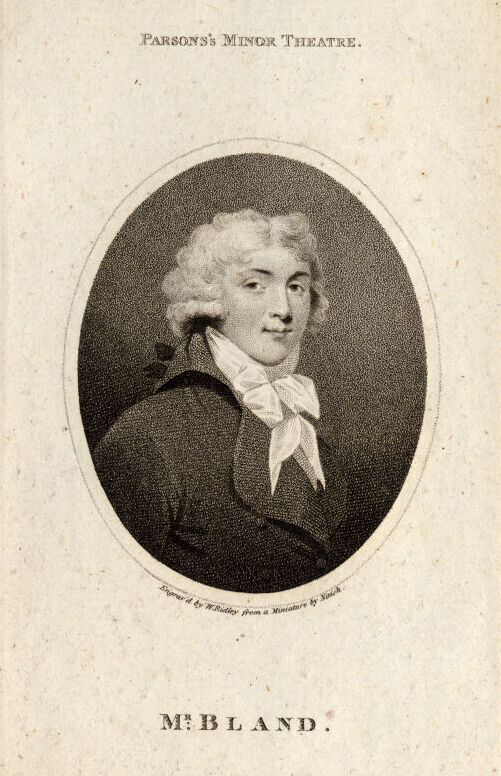
1794 portrait of Bland.

George Bland (c. 1758 – 1807) was an Irish stage actor and singer. He was the son of the actor Francis Bland and the actress Grace Phillips and he was the brother of Dorothea Jordan. Abandoning planned studies at Oxford University he appeared as an actor in the provinces, and was on the payroll at Theatre Royal, Drury Lane in London in 1786 but appeared in no known roles. While his sister lobbied the Drury Lane management to give him permanent employment he continued to act in the North of England in Leeds and Liverpool. He was finally hired in 1790 and became a member of the Drury Lane company until 1795, also appearing at the Haymarket in the summer.

In 1790 he married the actress Maria Bland. By 1796, however, she was having an open affair with fellow actor Thomas Caulfield, which led to George Bland leaving the London stage. He appeared at the Richmond Theatre and received financial assistance from his sister towards his growing debts. He then accepted an offer to travel to America to act, making his debut at the Park Theatre in New York City in 1802. Although he now acted under the name Wilson this attempt to conceal his identity failed and a lengthy article in the New York Evening Post identified him as the brother of Dorothea Jordan. In America, he received much better reviews than he had in London. During those years Bland also appeared at the Federal Street Theatre in Boston, where he died in 1807.

== Bibliography ==
- Highfill, Philip H, Burnim, Kalman A. & Langhans, Edward A. A Biographical Dictionary of Actors, Actresses, Musicians, Dancers, Managers and Other Stage Personnel in London, 1660–1800, Volumes 1–2. SIU Press, 1973.
