= Albina, Countess Raimond =

1779 play

- Original language: English
- Written by: Hannah Cowley
- Genre: Tragedy

Premiere
- Date: 31 July 1779
- Place: Theatre Royal, Haymarket, London

Albina, Countess Raimond is a 1779 verse drama tragedy by the British playwright Hannah Cowley. It premiered at the Theatre Royal, Haymarket in London 31 July 1779. The original cast included Howard Usher as King Henry, West Digges as Westmoreland, William Wyatt Dimond as Edward, James Aickin as Egbert, Robert Palmer as Oswald, John Gardner as Steward and Katherine Sherry as Albina. She dedicated the play to the politician Lord Harrowby.

== Bibliography ==
- Escott, Angela. The Celebrated Hannah Cowley: Experiments in Dramatic Genre, 1776–1794. Routledge, 2015.
- Greene, John C. Theatre in Dublin, 1745-1820: A Calendar of Performances, Volume 6. Lexington Books, 2011.
- Nicoll, Allardyce. A History of English Drama 1660–1900: Volume III. Cambridge University Press, 2009.
- Hogan, C.B (ed.) The London Stage, 1660–1800: Volume V. Southern Illinois University Press, 1968.
