= John Palmer (actor) =

English actor (c. 1742–1798)

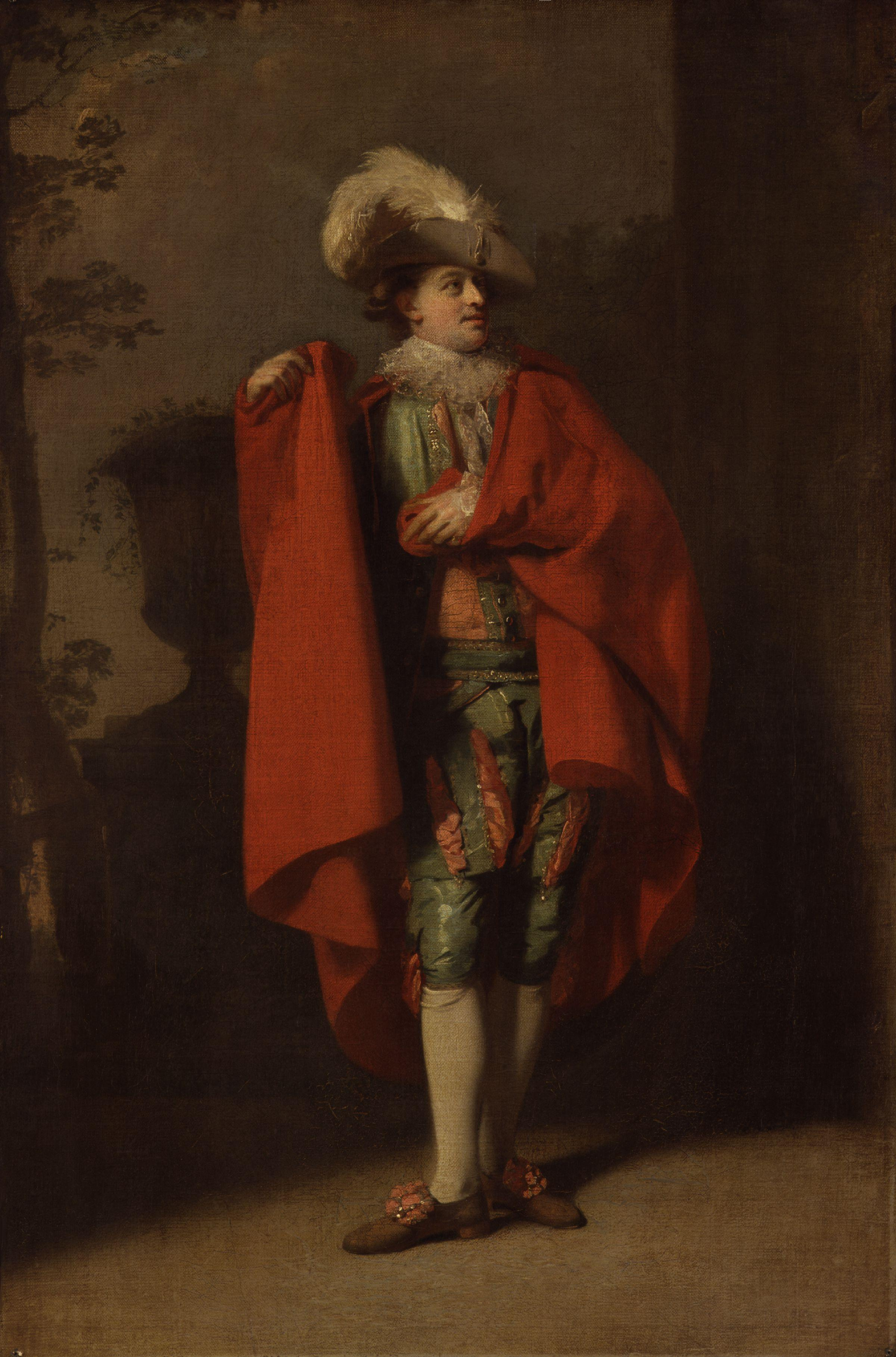
- John Palmer as Count Almaviva in The Spanish Barber, portrait by Henry Walton, 1779
- Born: c. 1742; London
- Died: 1798 (aged 55–56); Drury Lane, London, England
- Occupation: actor
- Years active: c.1762-1798

John Palmer (c. 1742–1798) was an actor on the English stage in the eighteenth century. There was also another John Palmer (1728–1768) who was known as Gentleman Palmer. Richard Brinsley Sheridan nicknamed him Plausible Jack.

== Birth and youth ==
He was born in the parish of St Luke's, Old Street, London, about 1742, was son of a private soldier. In 1759 the father served under the Marquis of Granby, and subsequently, on the marquis's recommendation, became a bill-sticker and doorkeeper at Drury Lane Theatre in London.

When about eighteen John recited the parts of George Barnwell and Mercutio to David Garrick, but Garrick found no promise in him, and joined his father in urging him to enter the army. Garrick even got a small military appointment for him; but Palmer refused to follow his counsel, and entered the shop of a print-seller on Ludgate Hill.

On 20 May 1762, for the benefit of his father and three others, he made his first appearance on any stage, playing Buck in the Englishman in Paris. This performance he repeated for benefits on the 21st, 24th, and 25th. Palmer was then engaged by Samuel Foote, who said that his "tragedy was damned bad", but "his comedy might do" for the "little theatre in the Haymarket", now known as the Haymarket Theatre, where, in the summer of 1762, he was the original Harry Scamper, an Oxford student, in Foote's Oracle. Being refused an engagement by Garrick, whom he still failed to please, he joined a country company under Herbert, and played, at Sheffield, Richmond in Richard III. Returning to London, he played, for the benefit of his father and others, George Barnwell in the London Merchant. He then re-engaged with Foote, but was dismissed in the middle of the season. After acting at Portsmouth he was engaged by Garrick, at a salary of 20 shillings. a week, for Drury Lane, but did not get higher than the Officer in 'Richard III' (act ii. sc. i.) For his father's benefit Palmer appeared as Dick in the Apprentice. At the Haymarket, in the summer of 1764, he was the original Sir Roger Dowlas in Foote's Patron. Being refused at Drury Lane an increase of salary, he went to Colchester, under Hurst, and was so lightly esteemed that, but for the intercession of Mrs Webb, an actress of influence, he would have been discharged. The following year she was working in Colchester when she is said to have interceded to save Palmer's job.

In Norwich he married a Miss Berroughs, who had taken a box for his benefit. He then gave, at Hampstead and Highgate, and in various country towns, George Alexander Stevens's Lecture on Heads, and, after playing with a strolling company, returned to London. In 1766, after refusing offers for Dublin and Convent Garden, he engaged with Garrick for Drury Lane, at a salary of 25 shillings a week, raised in answer to his remonstrance to 30 shillings. He appeared on 7 Oct. 1766 as Sir Harry Beagle in the Jealous Wife. He appears in the bills as "J. Palmer", being thus distinguished from his namesake, the elder John Palmer, known as 'Gentleman' Palmer (see below), who took leading business in the company.

== Acting career ==
Returning in the summer to the Haymarket, Palmer was on 2 July 1767 the original Isaacos in the mock tragedy of the Tailors, and acted Ben Budge in the Beggar's Opera, Morton in Hartson's Countess of Salisbury, imported from Crow Street Theatre, Dublin, to the Lord William of Miss Palmer from Dublin, apparently no relation, and Young Rakish in the School-boy. Back at Drury Lane, he was on 23 Oct. 1767 the original Wilson in Garrick's Peep behind the Curtain, or the New Rehearsal; Furnival, a worthless barrister, in Kenrick's Widow'd Wife; on 23 Jan. 1768 Sir Harry Newburgh in Kelly's False Delicacy, and, 21 March, Captain Slang in Bickerstaffe's Absent Man, and played also Young Wilding in the Liar, and Colonel Tamper in The Deuce is in him.

The death of "Gentleman Palmer" in 1768 was followed by the engagement of John Palmer for four years, at a salary rising from forty to fifty shillings a week. The parts assigned him increased in number and importance. The death of Charles Holland and the secession of other actors also contributed to his advancement. It was, indeed, while replacing "Gentleman Palmer" as Harcourt in the Country Girl, in about 1767, that Jack Plausible, as the second Palmer was generally called, established himself in Garrick's favour. He offered to play the part, with which he was quite unfamiliar, the following day. 'Read it, you mean,' said Garrick, who held impossible the mastery of such a character within the time accorded. When at rehearsal Palmer read the part, Garrick exclaimed: "I said so! I knew he would not study it." At night Palmer spoke it with more accuracy than was often observable when better opportunities had been afforded him. Garrick also engaged Mrs. Palmer, who had never been upon the stage, and who, having through her marriage with an actor, forfeited the wealth she expected to inherit, was glad to accept the twenty shillings a week which, together with friendship never forfeited, Garrick proffered. Mrs. Palmer's appearances on the stage appear to have been few, and are not easily traced. The initial J. was dropped in 1769-70 from the announcements of Palmer's name in the playbills. The omission gave rise to Foote's joke, that Jack Palmer had lost an I. Palmer was disabled for some months in consequence of an accident when acting Dionysius in The Grecian Daughter, to the Euphrasia of Ann Street Barry. The spring in her dagger refused to work, and she inflicted on him in her simulated fury a serious wound. In 1772 Palmer relinquished his summer engagement at the Haymarket in order to succeed Thomas King at Liverpool, where he became a great favourite, and established himself as a tragedian. One circumstance alone militated against his popularity. He was said to ill-treat his wife. Alarmed at this report, he sent for that long-suffering lady, who came, and hiding, it is said, the bruises on her face inflicted by her husband, who was both false and cruel, walked about Liverpool with him and re-established him in public estimation. Not until 1776 did he reappear at the Haymarket, which, however, from that time remained his ordinary place of summer resort. The retirement of Smith gave Palmer control all but undisputed over the highest comedy. Tribute to his special gifts is involved in his selection for Joseph Surface on the first performance of The School for Scandal, 8 May 1777, a character in which he was by general consent unapproachable. Himself addicted to pleasure, for which he occasionally neglected his theatrical duties, he had a pharisaical way of appealing to the audience, which exactly suited the character, and invariably won him forgiveness. This it was, accompanied by his "nice conduct" of the pocket-handkerchief, that secured him the name of Plausible Jack, and established the fact that he was the only man who could induce the public to believe that his wife brought him offspring every two months. She brought him, in fact, eight children. After a quarrel with Sheridan, Palmer, approaching the dramatist with a head bent forward, his hand on his heart, and his most plausible Joseph Surface manner, and saying, "If you could see my heart, Mr. Sheridan", received the reply, "Why, Jack, you forget I wrote it." On 30 Aug. of the same year, at the Haymarket, he further heightened his reputation by his performance of Almaviva.

== Royalty Theatre and debtors' prison ==
In 1785 Palmer, yielding to his own ambition and the counsel of friends, began to build the Royalty Theatre in Wellclose Square. Deaf to remonstrances, he persisted in his task, though the only licenses, wholly ineffectual, which he could obtain were those of the governor of the Tower and the magistrates of the adjoining district. This building he opened, 20 June 1787, with a performance of As you like it, in which he was Jaques to the Rosalind of Mrs. Belfille, and Miss in her Teens, in which he was Flash to the Miss Biddy of Maria Gibbs. The contest for places was violent. Apprehensive of an interference on the part of the authorities, he gave the representation for the benefit of the London Hospital. At the close Palmer read an address by Arthur Murphy, and said that performances would be suspended for the present. On 3 July the theatre was reopened for the performance of pantomimes and irregular pieces. Though backed up by friends, some of them of influence and wealth, Palmer was never able to conquer the opposition of the managers of the patent houses. A pamphlet warfare began with A Review of the present Contest between the Managers of the Winter Theatres, the Little Theatre in the Haymarket, and the Royalty Theatre in Wellclose Square, &c., 8vo, 1787. This, written in favour of Palmer, was answered anonymously by George Colman in A very plain State of the Case, or the Royalty Theatre versus the Theatres Royal, &c., 8vo, 1787. In the same year appeared Royal and Royalty Theatres (by Isaac Jackman), Letter to the Author of the Burletta called "Hero and Leander," The Trial of John Palmer for opening the Royalty Theatre, tried in the Olympian Shades, and The Trial of Mr. John Palmer, Comedian and Manager of the Royalty Theatre, &c. In 1788 appeared The Eastern Theatre Erected, an heroic "comic poem", the hero of which is called Palmerio, and Case of the Renters of the Royalty Theatre. The polemic was continued after the death of Palmer, a list of the various pamphlets to which it gave rise being supplied in Mr. Robert Lowe's Bibliographical Account of Theatrical Literature. Improvident and practically penniless through life, Palmer ascribed to the treatment he received in connection with this speculation, in which nothing of his own was embarked, his subsequent imprisonment for debt and the general collapse of his fortunes.

In such difficulties was he plunged that he resided for some period in his dressing-room in Drury Lane Theatre, and when he was needed elsewhere he was conveyed in a cart behind theatrical scenery. On 15 June 1789 he gave at the Lyceum an entertainment called As you like it, which began with a personal prologue written by Thomas Bellamy. He also played at Worcester and elsewhere, took the part of Henri du Bois, the hero in a spectacle founded on the just-concluded taking of the Bastille, and, while a prisoner in the Rules of the King's Bench, delivered three times a week, at a salary of twelve guineas a week, Stevens's Lecture on Heads. On 9 Nov. 1789 Drury Lane Theatre was closed, and Palmer, as a rogue and vagabond, was committed to the Surrey gaol. The public demanded him, however, and 1789-90 is the only season in which he was not seen at Drury Lane.

== Last performance and death ==
On 18 June 1798, the last night of the season at Drury Lane, Palmer played Father Philip in the Castle Spectre of "Monk" Lewis, and Comus, the former an original part, in which he had been first seen on the 14th of the previous December. He then went to Liverpool, but was in low spirits, grieving over the death of his wife and of his favourite son. He was announced to play the eponymous stranger in August von Kotzebue's The Stranger, but the performance was deferred.

On 2 Aug. 1798 he attempted this part. No support of his friends could cheer him. He went through two acts with great effect. In the third act he was much agitated, and in the fourth, at the question of Baron Steinfort relative to his children, he endeavoured to proceed, fell back, heaved a convulsive sigh, and died, the audience supposing, until the body was removed and the performance arrested, that he was merely playing his part. An attempt to reap a lesson from the incident was made by saying that his last words were, There is another and a better world. It was said, too, that this phrase, which occurs in the third act, was to be placed on his tomb. However, Whitfield (who played Baron Steinfort) told Frederick Reynolds that Palmer fell in Whitfield's presence, meaning it was later than these lines in the play. A benefit for his children was held in Liverpool, an address by William Roscoe being spoken, this realised a considerable sum. A benefit at the Haymarket Theatre on 18 Aug. brought nearly £700; a third was given on 15 September, the opening night at Drury Lane, when the Stranger was repeated.

Palmer is buried in the parish churchyard of Walton near Liverpool.

== Roles ==
One of the most versatile as well as the most competent and popular of actors, Palmer played an enormous number of characters, principally at Drury Lane. John Genest's list, which is far from complete, and does not even include all Palmer's original characters, amounts to over three hundred separate parts. Except singing characters and old men, there was nothing in which he was not safe, and there were many things in which he was foremost. An idea of his versatility may be obtained from a few of the characters with which he was entrusted.

These include:

- Welborn in A New Way to Pay Old Debts
- Face in The Alchemist
- Pierre
- Mercutio
- Iachimo in Cymbeline
- Iago
- Bastard in King John
- Slender
- Teague
- Trappanti
- Young Marlow
- Jaques
- Buckingham in Henry VIII
- Ford
- Ghost in Hamlet
- Hamlet
- Colonel Feignwell in A Bold Stroke for a Wife
- Bobadill
- Valentine and Ben in Love for Love
- Comus, Petruchio, Lofty in The Good-Natur'd Man
- Puff in the Critic
- Lord Foppington in The Relapse
- Lord Townly
- Falstaff in the Merry Wives of Windsor and Henry IV, Part 1
- Touchstone
- Henry VIII
- Inkle
- Macduff
- Macbeth
- Octavian in the Mountaineers
- Shylock
- Prospero
- Doricourt in The Belle's Stratagem

and innumerable others. Not less numerous are his original characters. Of these three stand prominently forth, the most conspicuous of all being Joseph Surface, which seems never to have been so well played since; Almaviva in Spanish Barber, and Dick Dowlas.

Other original characters include:

- Colonel Evans in The School for Rakes
- Captain Dormer in A Word to the Wise
- Dionysius in Arthur Murphy's Grecian Daughter
- Leeson in the School for Wives
- Siward in Matilda
- Sir Petronel Flash in Old City Manners
- Solyman in the Sultan
- Jack Rubrick in the Spleen
- Earl Edwin in The Battle of Hastings
- Granger in Who's the Dupe?
- Sneer in the Critic
- Woodville in The Chapter of Accidents
- Contrast in the Lord of the Manor
- Sir Harry Trifle in the Divorce
- Almoran in The Fair Circassian
- Prince of Arragon in the piece so named
- Lord Gayville in the Heiress
- Don Octavio in The School for Guardians
- Sir Frederick Fashion in Seduction
- Marcellus in Julia, or the Italian Lover
- Random in Ways and Means
- Demetrius in the Greek Slave
- Young Manly in the Fugitive
- Sydenham in the Wheel of Fortune
- Schedoni in the Italian Monk
- Tonnage in the Ugly Club

In tragedy Palmer was successful in those parts alone in which, as in Stukely, lago, &c., dissimulation is required.

In comedy, thanks partly to his fine figure, there are very many parts in which he was held perfect. Some of his best parts are:

- Young Wilding in the Liar (perhaps his greatest character)
- Captain Flash
- Face
- Dick in the Confederacy
- Stukely
- Sir Toby Belch
- Captain Absolute
- Young Fashion
- Prince of Wales in the First Part of King Henry IV
- Sneer
- Don John
- Volpone
- Sir Frederick Fashion
- Henry VIII
- Father Philip in Castle Spectre
- Villeroy
- Brush

James Boaden declares him "the most unrivalled actor of modern times!" and says "he could approach a lady, bow to her and seat himself gracefully in her presence. We have had dancing-masters in great profusion since his time, but such deportment they have either not known or never taught." His biographer says that his want of a "classical education" was responsible for his defects, which consisted of a want of taste and discrimination, and the resort to physical powers when judgment was at fault. His delivery of William Collins's Ode to the Passions was condemned as the one undertaking beyond his strength, and he is charged with unmeaning and ill-placed accents.

Dibdin says that he was vulgar, and Charles Lamb says that "for sock or buskin there was an air of swaggering gentility about Jack Palmer. He was a gentleman with a slight infusion of the footman." In Captain Absolute, Lamb held, "you thought you could trace his promotion to some lady of quality who fancied the handsome fellow in a top-knot, and had bought him a commission." In Dick Amlet he describes Jack as unsurpassable. John Taylor condemns his Falstaff as heavy throughout. Among innumerable stories circulated concerning Palmer is one that his ghost appeared after his death. He was accused of forgetting his origin and giving himself airs. He claimed to have frequently induced the sheriff's officer by whom he was arrested to bail him out of prison. In his late years Palmer's unreadiness on first nights was scandalous.

The authorship is ascribed to him of Like Master, Like Man, 8vo, 1811, a novel in two volumes, with a preface by George Colman the younger.

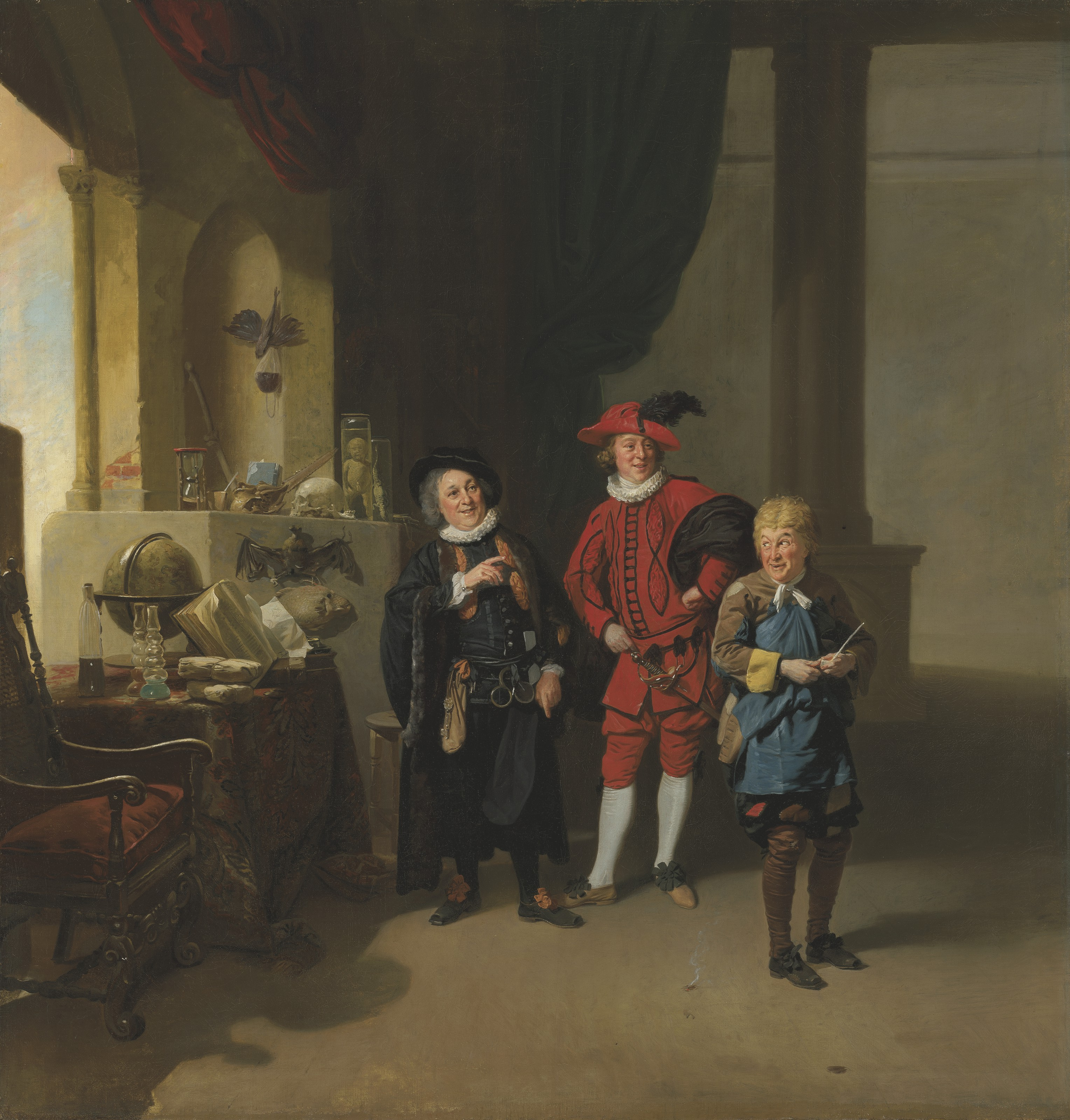
"David Garrick as Abel Drugger in Jonson's The Alchemist" by Johann Zoffany.

Portraits of Palmer in the Garrick Club include one by Russell, which was engraved by J. Collyer in 1787, a second by Arrowsmith as Cohenberg in the Siege of Belgrade, a third by Parkinson as lachimo, and a fourth, anonymous, as Joseph Surface in the screen scene from the School for Scandal, with King as Sir Peter, Smith as Charles Surface, and Mrs. Abington as Lady Teazle. A fifth, painted by Zoffany, representing Palmer as Face in the Alchemist, with Garrick as Abel Drugger and Burton as Subtle, is in the possession of the Earl of Carlisle.

== Related people ==
=== Brothers ===
Robert Palmer (1757–1805?), the actor's brother, played with success impudent footmen and other parts belonging to Palmer's repertory, and was good in the presentation of rustic characters and of drunkenness. He was born in Banbury Court, Long Acre, September 1757, was educated at Brook Green, articled to Giuseppe Grimaldi the dancer, appeared as Mustard Seed in Midsummer Night's Dream at Drury Lane when six years old, played in the country, and acted both at the Haymarket and Drury Lane. He survived his brother, and succeeded him in Joseph Surface and other parts, for which he was incompetent. Lamb compares the two Palmers together, and says something in praise of the younger. Portraits of "Bob" Palmer by Dewilde, as Tag in the Spoiled Child, and as Tom in the Conscious Lovers, are in the Mathews collection in the Garrick Club.

Another brother, William, who died about 1797, played in opera in Dublin, and was seen at Drury Lane.

=== "Gentleman" Palmer ===
There was another actor named John Palmer (1728–1768). He was known as "Gentleman Palmer", but does not seem to have been related to the other John Palmer. He was celebrated as Captain Plume, as Osric, and as the Duke's servant in High Life Below Stairs; he was also a favourite in Orlando and Claudio, but especially in such jaunty parts as Mercutio. His wife, a Miss Pritchard, played from 1756 to 1768, and was accepted as Juliet and Lady Betty Modish, but was better in lighter parts, such as Fanny in the Clandestine Marriage. "Gentleman Palmer", who has been frequently confused with his namesake, died on 23 May 1768, aged 40, his death being due to taking in mistake a wrong medicine. He had two children, William Vaughan Palmer who was born in 1762 and a daughter, Alicia Tindal Palmer who was born in 1763 and became a novelist.
