= Hannah Cowley (writer) =

English playwright and poet (1743–1809)

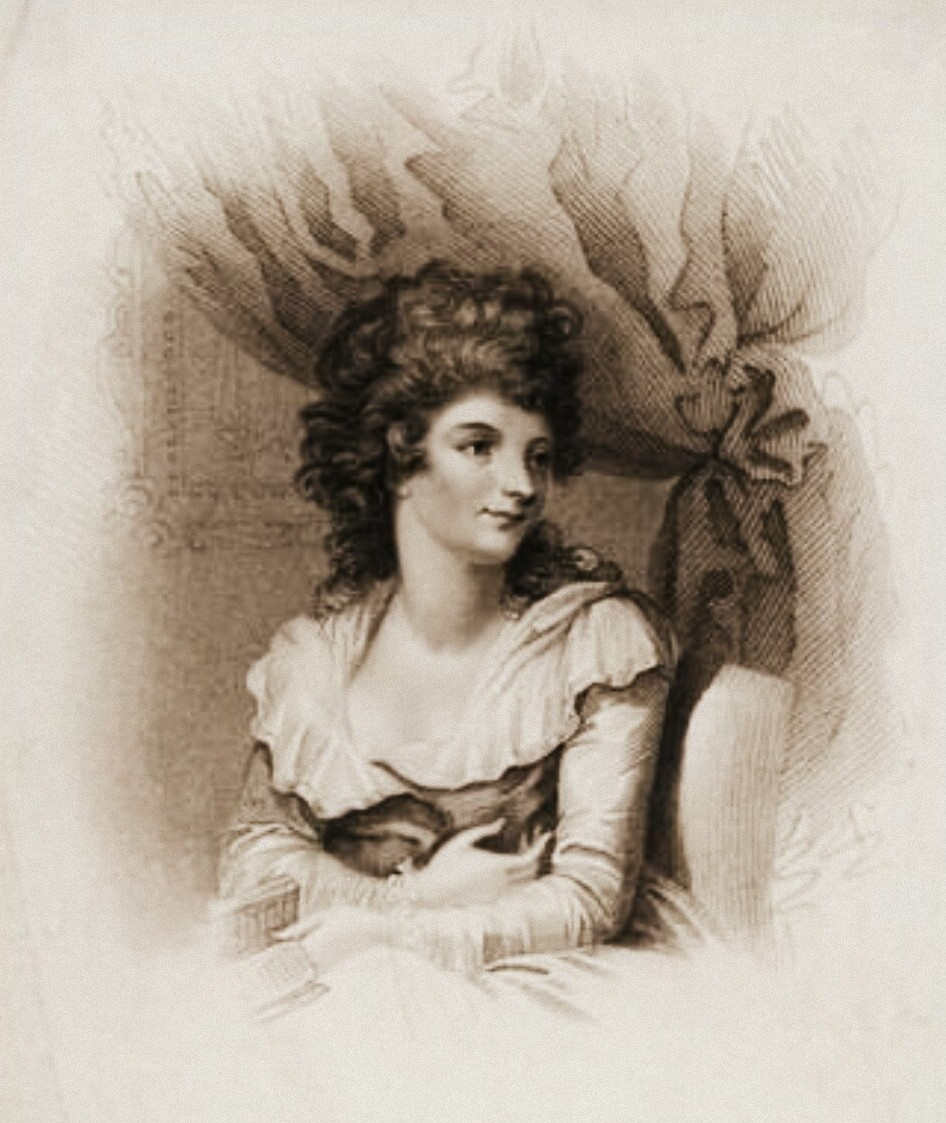
- Born: 14 March 1743; Tiverton, Devon, England
- Died: 11 March 1809 (aged 65); Tiverton, Devon, England
- Spouse: Thomas Cowley

Hannah Cowley (née Parkhouse; 14 March 1743 – 11 March 1809) was an English playwright and poet. Although Cowley's plays and poetry did not enjoy wide popularity after the 19th century, critic Melinda Finberg rates her as "one of the foremost playwrights of the late eighteenth century" whose "skill in writing fluid, sparkling dialogue and creating sprightly, memorable comic characters compares favourably with her better-known contemporaries, Goldsmith and Sheridan." Cowley's plays were produced frequently in her lifetime. The major themes of her plays – including her first, The Runaway (1776), and her major success, which is being revived, The Belle's Stratagem (1780) – revolve around marriage and how women strive to overcome the injustices imposed by family life and social custom.

== Early success ==
Born Hannah Parkhouse, she was the daughter of Hannah (née Richards) and Philip Parkhouse, a bookseller in Tiverton, Devon. Sources disagree about some details of her married life, citing her marriage date as either 1768 or 1772 and claiming she had either three or four children. Shortly after her marriage to Thomas Cowley, the couple moved to London, where Thomas worked as an official in the Stamp Office and as a part-time journalist.

The introduction to her 1813 collected works gives an account of how Cowley was struck by a sudden desire to write while attending a play with her husband. "So delighted with this?" she boasted to him. "Why I could write as well myself!" Thomas teased her, but by the middle of the next day Cowley showed him the first act of her comedy The Runaway. If the substance of the story is true, this visit to the theatre could have occurred no later than 1775, for the rest of The Runaway was written, sent to the actor-manager David Garrick and produced at Drury Lane theatre by 15 February 1776.

The Runaway enjoyed 17 performances in its first season at Drury Lane and 39 in London by 1800, a success that encouraged Cowley to write more, though her mentor Garrick retired after the 1776 season. She wrote her next two plays, the farce Who's the Dupe? and the tragedy Albina, before the year was out.

== Controversy with Hannah More ==
Who's the Dupe? and Albina encountered difficulties in production. The new manager of Drury Lane, Richard Brinsley Sheridan, shelved The Runaway for most of the 1777 season. Miffed, Cowley sent Albina to Drury Lane's rival theatre in London, Covent Garden, but it met with no better reception there and the script alternated between the theatres for the next two years. Meanwhile, Sheridan agreed to produce Who's the Dupe?, but delayed its 1779 première until late spring, an unprofitable time for a new play to open.

The production of Albina generated public controversy for Cowley. While this play was bouncing between Drury Lane and Covent Garden, writer Hannah More's plays Percy (1777) and The Fatal Falsehood (1779) opened at Covent Garden. Watching Percy aroused Cowley's suspicions: Fatal Falsehood confirmed Cowley's belief that More had plagiarised from Albina.

As Cowley later wrote in her preface to the printed edition of Albina, hers and More's plays do indeed have "wonderful resemblances". Fatal Falsehood's opening on 6 May 1779, was followed by press charges (perhaps written by Thomas Cowley) that More stole her ideas from Cowley. On 10 August, More wrote to the St. James Chronicle to protest that she "never saw, heard, or read, a single line of Mrs. Cowley's Tragedy." In her preface to Albina, Cowley allows that the theatre managers, who in those days doubled as script editors, may have inadvertently given More her ideas: "Amidst the croud of Plots, and Stage Contrivances, in which a Manager is involv'd, recollection is too frequently mistaken for the suggestions of imagination" [emphasis in original].

Although she continued to enjoy a brilliant literary career, More wrote no more for the stage after her paper war with Cowley. Albina finally opened on 31 July 1779 at the Haymarket, a summer theatre more practised in staging comedies. It was neither a financial nor a critical success.

== Later career ==
With the Hannah More controversy behind her, Cowley wrote her most popular and enduring comedy, The Belle's Stratagem, which was produced at Covent Garden in 1780. It was performed 28 nights in its first season and 118 times in London before 1800, a respectable success that consolidated her family's financial position.

Her next play, The World as it Goes; or, a Party at Montpelier (later entitled Second Thoughts Are Best) was a flop, but she continued to write until 1794, seeing seven more plays into production: Which is the Man?, A Bold Stroke for a Husband, More Ways Than One, A School for Greybeards, or, The Mourning Bride, The Fate of Sparta, or, The Rival Kings, A Day in Turkey, or, The Russian Slaves, and The Town Before You. None of these matched the success of her earlier plays.

In 1783, Thomas Cowley accepted a job with the British East India Company. He moved to India and left Hannah in London to raise their children; Thomas died there in 1797, never having returned to England.

== Cowley's poetry ==
Hannah Cowley had a less distinguished career as a poet, writing The Scottish Village, or Pitcairne Green in 1786, and The Siege of Acre: an Epic Poem in 1801. In the summer of 1787, under the pseudonym "Anna Matilda," she and the poet Robert Merry (writing as Della Crusca) began a poetic correspondence in the pages of the journal The World. Their poems were sentimental and flirtatious. At first each did not even know the other's identity; later they met and became part of a poetic movement called the Della Cruscans. Literary history has not been kind to Della Cruscan poetry, which was criticised as sloppy and emotional. Merry was the subject of a satirical poem, "The Baviad", written by a contemporary, William Gifford. Cowley's poetry was published as The Poetry of Anna Matilda [pseud.] Containing A Tale for Jealousy, The Funeral, Her Correspondence with Della Crusca [pseud.] and Several Other Poetical Pieces. To Which Are Added Recollections, Printed from an Original Manuscript, Written by General Sir William Waller (London: J. Bell, 1788).

Cowley's last play, The Town Before You, was produced in 1795. In 1801, Cowley retired to Tiverton, Devon, where she spent her remaining years away from the public spotlight, quietly revising her plays. She died of liver failure in 1809.

== Major plays ==
=== The Runaway (1776) ===
George Hargrave, who is home from college, is overjoyed to learn that Emily, the mysterious runaway whom his godfather, Mr. Drummond, has taken in, is the same young lady he fell in love with at a recent masquerade. Meanwhile, George's spirited cousin, Bella, helps George's sister, Harriet, and George's friend Sir Charles fall in love. George's designs are threatened when he learns that his father wants George to marry Lady Dinah, a pretentious older lady who is also very rich. When Emily's father arrives to take Emily back to London, George gives chase and snatches Emily back. Mr. Drummond saves the day by offering the young lovers some of his land so that they can have a fortune of their own.

=== Who's the Dupe? (1779) ===
Granger, a captain, arrives in town to see his lover, Elizabeth. Her uneducated father, Abraham Doiley, has promised her hand to the most educated man he can find, an unappealing but intelligent scholar named Gradus. Elizabeth's friend Charlotte, who fancies Gradus for herself, persuades Gradus to act more fashionable and less bookish so that he can win Elizabeth's heart. Doiley is not impressed by the new Gradus; meanwhile, Granger presents himself to Doiley as a scholar so that he can win Elizabeth's hand. Granger and Gradus square off against each other to see who is the more educated, and Granger wins by using phony Greek that nonetheless impresses Doiley. Gradus is consoled by winning Charlotte.

=== Albina (1779) ===
The powerful Duke of Westmorland learns that the gallant young soldier Edward is in love with his daughter, Albina, who is a young widow to Count Raimond. Despite her love for Edward, Albina's virtue impedes her from agreeing to marry him. Westmorland and Edward persuade her to remarry because Edward is soon destined to go off to war; she agrees. Editha, who is jealous of Albina, seeks help from Lord Gondibert, Raimond's brother, who secretly loves Albina. On the eve of the wedding, Gondibert tells Edward that Albina has been unfaithful, and to prove it he disguises himself and allows Edward to spy on him sneaking into Albina's chamber at night. Edward then calls off the wedding, and the furious Westmorland challenges him to a duel to protect Albina's honour. Before the duel begins, Gondibert's elderly servant, Egbert, exposes his master's lie, and the king banishes Gondibert. Before he leaves, Gondibert vows to kill Albina and then commit suicide. He sneaks into Albina's chamber and stabs a woman he thinks is Albina, and then he stabs himself. But the woman turns out to be a disguised Editha, who had also stolen into the room. Edward is relieved when the real Albina rushes into the room, and the dying Gondibert asks for and receives her pardon.

=== The Belle's Stratagem (1780) ===
Having returned from his trip to Europe, the handsome Doricourt meets his betrothed, Letitia. He finds her acceptable but by no means as elegant as European women. Determined that she will not marry without love, Letitia enlists the help of her father, Mr. Hardy, and Mrs. Racket, a widow, to turn Doricourt off the wedding by pretending that she, Letitia, is an unmannerly hoyden. Meanwhile, Doricourt's friend Sir George is being overprotective of his new wife, Lady Frances, who rebels and agrees to accompany Mrs. Racket for a day in the town and a masquerade ball that night. While out at an auction, Lady Frances meets the rake, Courtall, who brags to his friend Saville that he will seduce her. Meanwhile, Letitia's brazen acting succeeds in dissuading Doricourt from wanting to marry her. All characters converge at that night's masquerade. The disguised Letitia shows off her charms, bewitches Doricourt and then leaves before he can find out who she is. Courtall, disguised the same way as Sir George, lures the lady he thinks is Lady Frances back to his house. However, Saville has replaced the real Lady Frances with a prostitute who wears the same disguise as Lady Frances. Shamed, Courtall leaves town. The next day, Doricourt, who has been told that Mr. Hardy is on his deathbed, visits him and reluctantly agrees to marry Letitia after all. Then the disguised Letitia enters and reveals her true identity to the overjoyed Doricourt, who also learns that Hardy was not ill after all.

=== A Bold Stroke for a Husband (1783) ===
Set in Madrid, the play tells of Don Carlo, who has fled his wife, Victoria, for the courtesan Laura. Laura breaks off with Don Carlo, but she holds on to the documents that entitle her to his land, a gift he foolishly gave her. We learn that Laura is in love with Florio, who is really Victoria disguised as a young man. Meanwhile, Victoria's friend Olivia is resisting efforts by her father, Don Caesar, to marry her off to a series of suitors. In desperation, Don Caesar pretends that he will marry and young girl and then send Olivia off to a convent unless she marries right away. Victoria persuades Olivia's servant to disguise himself as her rich uncle, the original owner of the land that Laura now holds. He convinces Laura that the titles are worthless, so in a rage she rips them up. Victoria reveals herself to Don Carlos, who repents and pledges himself to her again. Meanwhile, Olivia marries Julio, the man she wanted all along.
