= Mary Ann Wrighten =

English singer, actress and composer

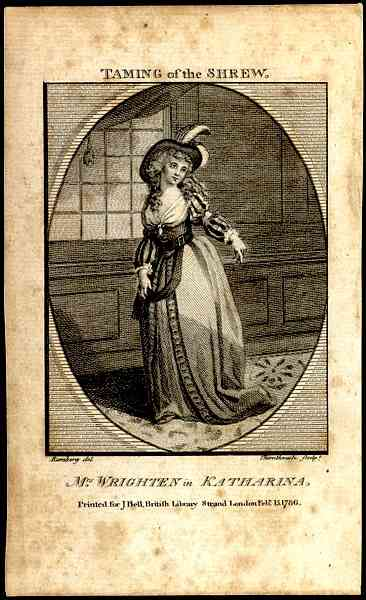
The Taming of the Shrew, 1780 : Mrs. Wrighten as Katharina in Burgoyne's comic-opera version: Katharina and Petruchio.

Mary Ann Wrighten Pownall, née Mary Matthews, (b. 1751, d. 12 August 1796) was an English singer, actress and composer.

== Life ==
Mary Ann Matthews was born in England of a jeweler father and shop-keeper mother. She was apprenticed to organist Charley Griffith where she learned music, and made her debut on the stage at about age 15. She married actor James Wrighten in about 1769 in Birmingham, and the couple came to London to work in Drury Lane, where she quickly became successful as a singer and actress with Garrick and Sheridan at Drury Lane and Covent Garden.

The couple had two daughters, Mary and Charlotte. They divorced in 1786 in a public scandal, and Mary Ann Wrighten emigrated to the United States to work for theater manager John Henry. Her first American appearance was at the Southwark Theater in Philadelphia in 1792, billed as Mrs. (Hugh) Pownall. She also appeared in New York City, and settled in Charleston, where she died during a yellow fever epidemic in 1796.

Mary Ann Powell was scheduled to sing a concert on August 6th, 1796, and after she and her family were expected to return to England. However, on August 2nd Mary Ann discovered her daughter Charlotte had married theater manager Alexander Placide, who had lived for some time with a woman whom many believed was his wife. The marriage was sudden, unexpected, and unwelcome. Mary Ann posted a notice on August 2nd in The South Caroline State Gazette and Timothy and Mason's Daily Advertiser that she would be unable to perform in the August 6th concert because of "an unnatural change in her family."

Yellow Fever suddenly struck the family. Felix, aged four, was buried on August 10th, 1796, Mary Ann was buried on August 12th, and Mary Wrighten (her daughter), died twelve days later.

She wrote an autobiography entitled An Apology for the Life and Conduct of Mrs Mary Wrighten, Late a Favourite Actress and Singer, of Drury Lane Theatre, and Vauxhall Gardens.

== Works ==
In 1784 Wrighten published Four Ballads:

- I Could Not Help Laughing at That
- Kiss Me Now or Never
- Twas Yes, Kind Sir and Thank You, Too
- Young Willy

She is also credited with:

- Jemmy of the Glen (ca. 1790)
