= Busick Harwood =

English physician (1750–1814)

Sir Busick Harwood (27 November 1750 – 10 November 1814) was an English physician who became Professor of Anatomy at Cambridge, and one of the first Fellows of Downing College, Cambridge.

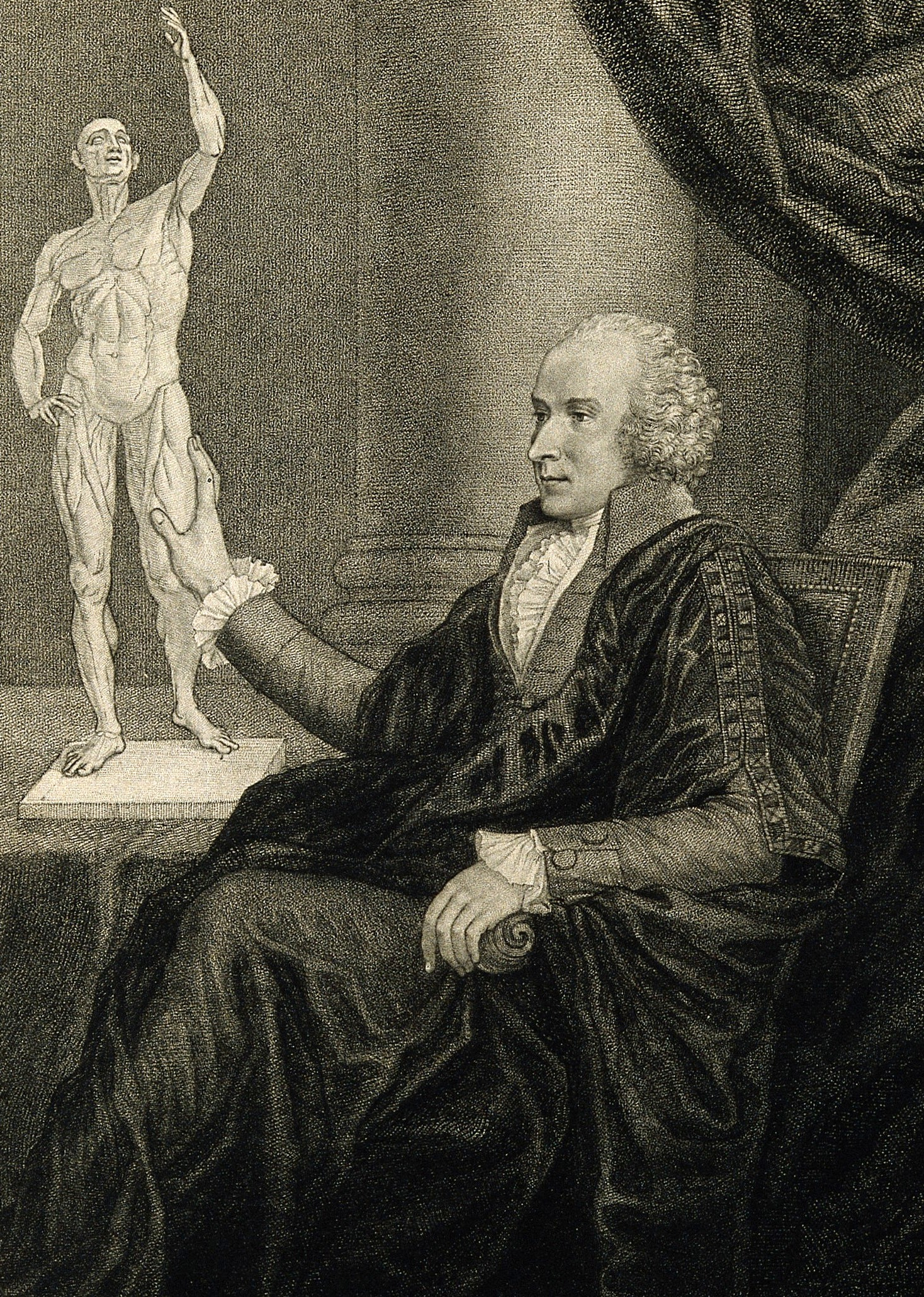
Busick Harwood, 1790 engraving by William Nelson Gardiner, after Silvester Harding

== Life ==
The fourth son of John and Mary Harwood of Newmarket, he was born there on 27 November 1750. After apprenticeship to an apothecary and to Uppingham surgeon William Forfitt, he trained at the London Hospital where he would later help to set up the London Hospital Medical College. He qualified as a surgeon, and in 1773 joined the Indian Medical Service. In India he received considerable sums for medical attendance on princes, but his health suffered, and he returned to England after five years in 1778.

Harwood became a fellow‑commoner at Christ's College, Cambridge the following year. He received his MD by examination from the University of St Andrews School of Medicine in 1790, and was elected Fellow of the Society of Antiquaries of London in 1783, and Fellow of the Royal Society in 1784.

For his MB degree at Cambridge in 1785, Harwood read a thesis on the transfusion of blood. He gave an account of experiments he had made on transfusion from sheep to dogs which had lost a considerable quantity of blood. An account of these experiments is given in a note in Charles Hutton, George Shaw, and Richard Pearson's Abridgment of the Philosophical Transactions, 1809, i. 185, 186. Harwood was dissatisfied with the reasons for the discontinuance of transfusion in cases of loss of blood in his time. He intended to experiment on the communication of diseases and medicines by transfusion, but appears to have published nothing on the subject.

In 1785, on the death of Charles Collignon, Harwood was elected Professor of Anatomy at Cambridge. He became a physician at Addenbrooke's Hospital in 1786, and the same year moved to Emmanuel College where he graduated as MD in 1790. While at Emmanuel he covered his walls with small water-colour portraits, six or eight in a frame, done by Silvester Harding, for whom he asked all his university acquaintances to sit. One who refused was his friend Smithson Tennant. 134 of these portraits can be viewed online through Cambridge Digital Library. A quarrel arose between Harwood and William Lort Mansel about these portraits. Harwood also sent a challenge to Sir Isaac Pennington, the Regius Professor of Physic, which the latter disdained to notice; but the messenger, an undergraduate, published the affair in the London papers.

Harwood was appointed Downing Professor of Medicine in 1800 at the newly formed Downing College, Cambridge, while retaining his anatomical chair. He was knighted in 1806, and became Vice-Master of Downing in 1812.

In 1798 he married Elizabeth Maria, the only daughter of the Rev. Sir John Peschell of Horsley, but they had no children. The couple had moved to Bartlow by 1803, but moved to East Lodge at Downing College in 1811 becoming the first residents of the college. Harwood died at Downing on 10 November 1814, and was buried in a vault designed by William Wilkins. This was intended to be under the future college chapel, but that was eventually built on the opposite side of the college. The vault is now under the Paddock between the Master's Lodge and the Dining Hall, and is marked by a memorial stone placed in 1987.

== Works ==
Harwood published the first volume of a System of Comparative Anatomy and Physiology, Cambridge 1796, and some synopses of his courses of lectures.
