= Henry Dewar (physician) =

Scottish minister and writer

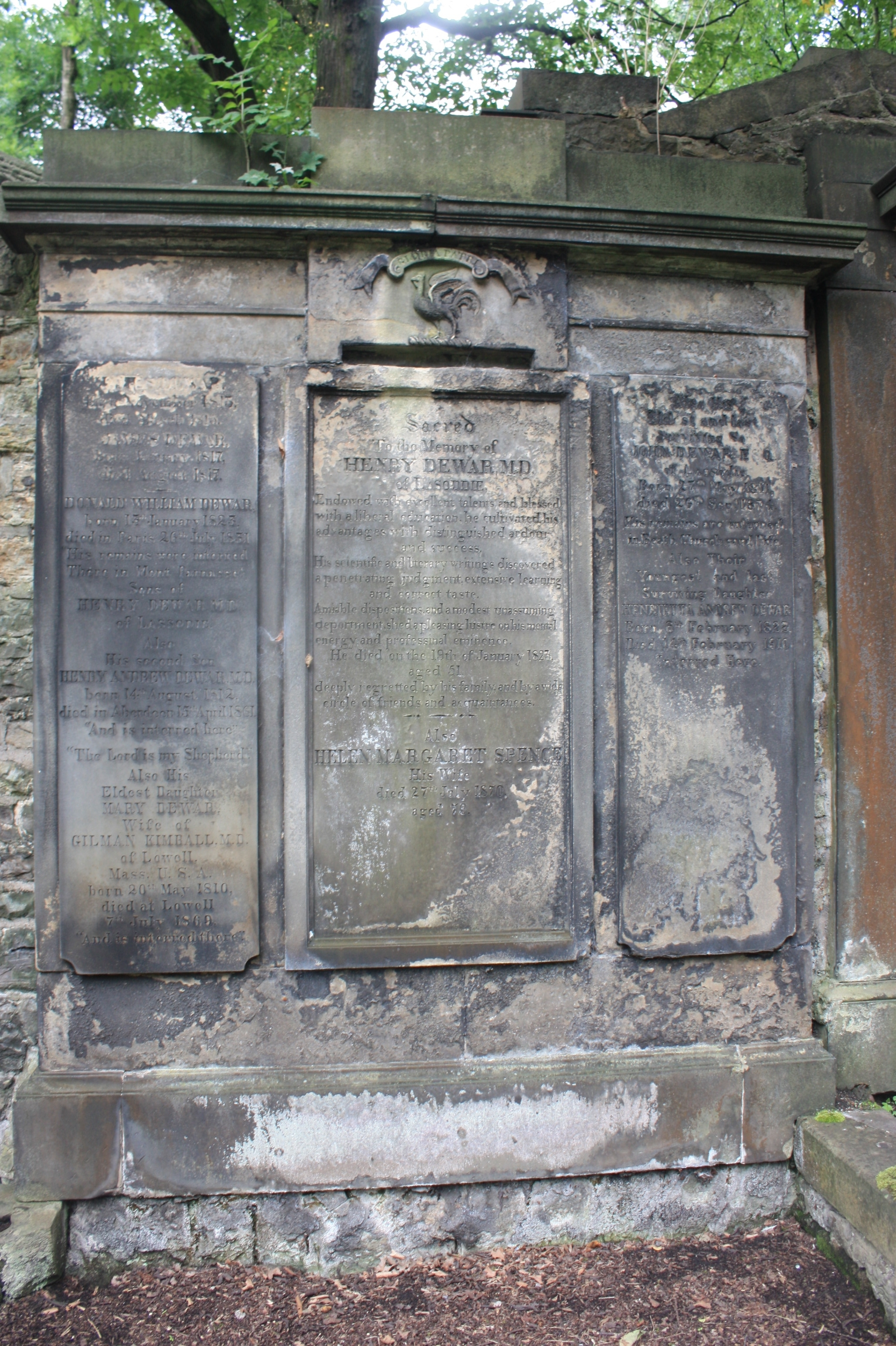
Grave of Dr Henry Dewar, St Cuthberts, Edinburgh

Henry Dewar of Lassodie FRSE (1771–1823), originally Henry Frazer or Fraser, was a Scottish minister turned medical doctor, known as a writer.

== Life ==
His father was John Frazer, minister of the Associate Church at Auchtermuchty, in Fife, Scotland; his mother was Margaret Erskine. He became minister of the Associate Church at Saltcoats in Ayrshire, in 1796, but within months inherited an estate through his mother, at Lassodie, Beath, in the Fife coalfield. The inheritance required that he changed his name to Dewar: it originated with his great-grandfather Ralph Erskine and his first wife Margaret Dewar. At this point Dewar left the ministry.

Dewar retrained as a doctor at Edinburgh University gaining an MD in 1804. He then began a new life as an army surgeon, with the 30th Regiment of Foot. In Egypt under Ralph Abercromby, he underwent some formative experiences, writing later on dysentery and ophthalmia. He also came under the influence of French physicians (Savaresi, Larrey, and Desgenettes).

Dewar graduated M.D. at Edinburgh in 1804, with a dissertation De ophthalmia Aegypti. He was a Manchester Infirmary staff physician, from 1804 to 1808, a common step for Edinburgh medical graduates because of the breadth of professional experience there. He became a member of the Manchester Literary and Philosophical Society in 1806. He then returned to Edinburgh, becoming a member of the Royal College of Physicians there and lecturer at the Medical Institution. He may have dropped medical practice, and become a writer. He was elected a Fellow of the Royal Society of Edinburgh in 1816. His proposers were Sir David Brewster, Andrew Coventry, and John Barclay. In 1816 he was also elected a member of the Aesculapian Club. and of the Harveian Society of Edinburgh.

In 1819 he was elected a member of the Wernerian Natural History Society alongside the botanist James Robinson Scott and Robert Kaye Greville.

In his later life he lived at 37 Nicolson Street in Edinburgh's South Side. The house stood immediately opposite Surgeons' Hall but was demolished in the late 19th century to make way for a small department store.

He died on 18 January 1823 and was buried in St Cuthbert's Churchyard on the following day. The grave lies in the north extension facing St John's church.

== Works ==
Dewar engaged in an embittered controversy with Thomas Trotter on the chemistry of choke damp and fire damp. Trotter had proposed "oxygenated muriatic gas" (i.e. hydrochloric acid) as a fumigant. As far as chemistry went, both their theories were inaccurate. Dewar was a friend of the Newcastle physician John Clark, and Trotter's criticism of Clark has been given as one possible reason for the personal attacks included with the scientific and practical arguments Dewar gave. A scale or chemical slide rule mentioned by Thomas Charles Hope as "Dr. Dewar's" has been considered to be unpublished work of Henry Dewar.

An inquiry into the principles by which the importance of foreign commerce ought to be estimated (1808) was an economic pamphlet. It was taken to be a comment on the Continental System, and a reply to William Spence. Spence's Britain Independent of Commerce (1807) had come under heavy criticism. Dewar was somewhat sympathetic to Spence's positive views of autarky.

Dewar wrote an early paper on what was then called "double consciousness", now diagnostically identified with dissociative identity disorder. It is considered that Dewar was alluding to the celebrated case of Mary Reynolds of Pennsylvania, which was published in 1816 by Mitchill. He wrote in 1817 on a smallpox outbreak at Cupar, giving statistics showing the effectiveness of vaccination.

Dewar wrote a Treatise on Universal Grammar (1816), and on other topics, for the Edinburgh Encyclopædia. He began a translation, Universal Geography, of work by Conrad Malte-Brun. He wrote also for the Encyclopædia Britannica, and the Transactions of the Royal Society of Edinburgh.

== Family ==
He married Helen Margaret Spence (1800-1870), an American from Philadelphia, in May 1809. They had six children.
