= Charles Collignon =

Charles Collignon may refer to:

- Charles Collignon (fencer), French fencer
- Charles Collignon (surgeon), British surgeon
