= Francis Waldron =

Francis Waldron may refer to:

- Eugene Dennis, pseudonym of Francis Xavier Waldron (1905–1961), American communist politician and union organizer
- Francis Godolphin Waldron (1744–1818), English writer and actor
