= John Clark (physician) =

Scottish physician and philanthropist

John Clark FRCPE
- Born: 10 May 1744; Roxburgh, Roxburghshire, Scotland
- Died: 15 April 1805 (aged 60); Bath, Somerset, England
- Education: University of St Andrews
- Occupations: Physician, philanthropist
- Known for: Founding the Newcastle Dispensary
- Spouse: Susannah Heath (m. 1783–1805)
- Relatives: William Clark (son)
- Medical career
- Field: Clinical medicine
- Sub-specialties: Epidemiology
- Research: Infectious diseases

John Clark (10 May 1744 – 15 April 1805) was a Scottish physician and philanthropist.

== Life ==
Born at Roxburgh, Clark studied divinity at the University of Edinburgh, before turning to medicine. In 1768 he obtained the appointment of surgeon's mate in the East India Company's service. He retired from it about 1775, and settled in medical practice near Newcastle, having graduated M.D. at the University of St Andrews.

Clark became well known for his interest in medical schemes for the benefit of the poor. He was the founder of the Newcastle Dispensary; he recommended reforms in the management of Newcastle Infirmary, and he called attention to the need of hospitals for infectious diseases. At the end of his life, he was attacked by Thomas Trotter, in the Medical and Physical Journal, over his treatment of a pregnant patient in 1804.

Clark died at Bath, Somerset on 15 April 1805. A memoir was published by the physician John Ralph Fenwick in 1806.

== Works ==
Clark commented, in its first annual report of 1777, that the founding of the Newcastle Dispensary "has as its object the cure of Fevers".

He published:

- Observations on fevers, especially those of the continued type; and on the scarlet fever attended with ulcerated sore-throat in 1778, London 1780.
- Letter to Dr Leslie, F.R.S. on the Influenza; as it Appeared at Newcastle upon Tyne (1783), addressed to Patrick Duguid Leslie.
- Observations on the Diseases in Long Voyages to Hot Countries, particularly the East Indies, 2 vols. London 1792.

He wrote also an Account of a Plan for Newcastle Infirmary, and papers on institutions for infectious diseases in populous towns.

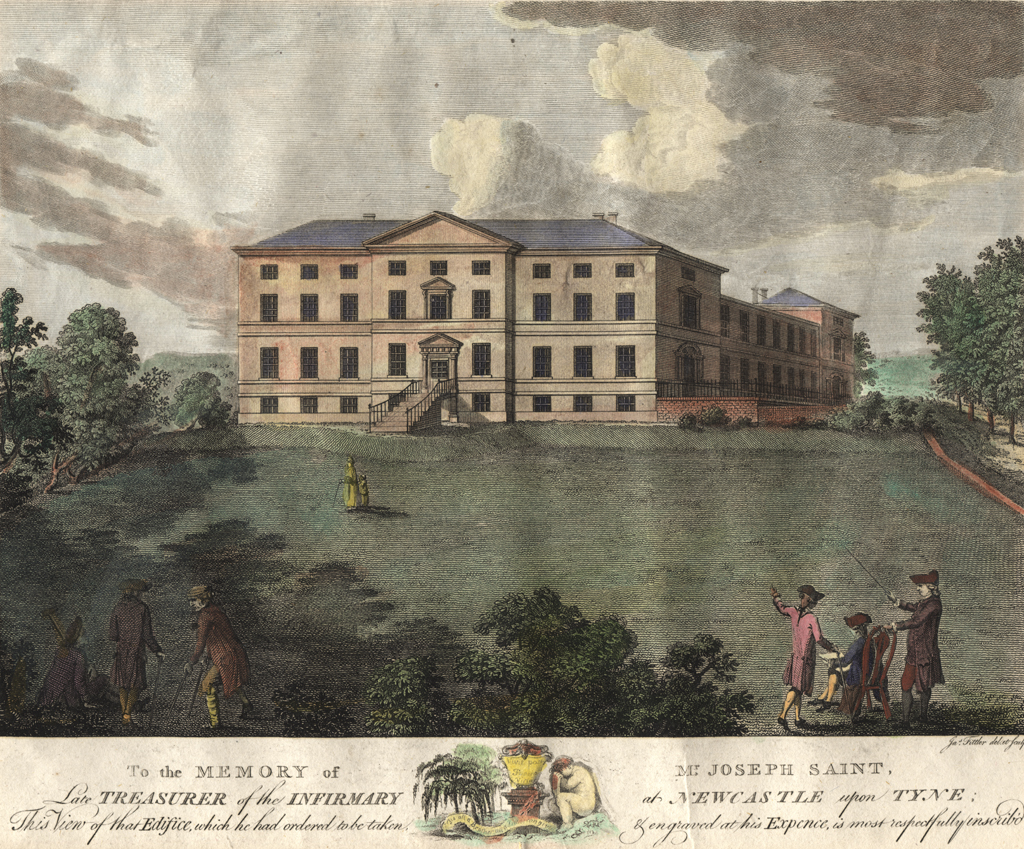
Newcastle upon Tyne Infirmary at Forth Banks, 1786 engraving

== Family ==
Clark's first wife, Mary, died in 1781. In 1783, he married again, to Susannah Heath of Newcastle. They had a family of nine children, including William Clark (1788–1869) who became Professor of Anatomy at Cambridge. They were Unitarians.
