= John Ralph Fenwick =

English physician

- Born: 14 November 1761
- Died: 11 January 1855 (aged 93); North Bailey, Durham
- Resting place: Durham Cathedral
- Education: M.D. University of Edinburgh (1782)
- Occupation: Doctor
- Years active: 1786–1812
- Known for: Abolitionism
- Spouse: Dorothy Spearman (m. 1812; died 1838)
- Medical career
- Institutions: Newcastle Infirmary
- Notable works: De Plethora

John Ralph Fenwick (14 November 1761 – 11 January 1855) was an English medical doctor in Newcastle upon Tyne and Durham City. He was a radical of the 1790s, and an abolitionist. Well-connected, he was a militia officer and magistrate, on close terms with the Whig aristocratic leaders and politicians of the north-east of England.

== Early life ==
He was born on 14 November 1761, the younger son of the physician John Fenwick of Morpeth. The family was Catholic, and Fenwick went to the College of St Omer for education. He then studied medicine at the University of Leyden. His Catholic faith did not last into adulthood. His background was brought up much later, in a by-election campaign of 1826 when the matter was topical, by George Silvertop speaking for Lord Howick.

Fenwick received the M.D. degree from the University of Edinburgh in 1782 for his dissertation De Plethora. He was physician to the Newcastle Infirmary from 1786 to 1791. He then went into private practice in Durham city, from 1790.

== Local affairs, to 1815 ==
Fenwick was one of a group of significant correspondents on political reform, centred on the moderate reformed Christopher Wyvill. In early 1794 he wrote to Wyvill, expressing confidence that universal suffrage had wide popular appeal, and optimistic about the troubles the administration had with disaffection. By 1797 he was much more downbeat about democratic reforms gaining traction, given the need to avoid fomenting revolution. An invasion scare in 1798 similarly damped down hopes of reformers.

In 1798 Fenwick organised the Durham Volunteer Association. It raised an infantry body. The Peace of Amiens saw it broken up, but 1804, with the Napoleonic Wars resumed, saw the Durham Volunteers take its place. He was lieutenant-colonel of the Volunteers, resigning in 1806, in poor health. He became a Justice of the Peace and Deputy Lieutenant for County Durham.

In 1807 at a Durham County Meeting, Fenwick opposed an address to the King, after the fall of the Ministry of All the Talents. The address was proposed by the Earl of Strathmore, and seconded by Matthew Russell. In return, Fenwick defended the bill (on Catholic emancipation) that by failing had ended the ministry. Supported by Ralph John Lambton and Sir Ralph Milbanke, two Members of Parliament, he waved a rival address that said as much, and Milbanke seconded him. He had also the support of Sir Thomas Liddell, 6th Baronet. The original address, however, was carried.

Fenwick was a long-standing friend and political correspondent of Charles Grey, who as Prime Minister pushed through the Reform Bill 1832. The wait was a long one, and the Newcastle group of Fenwick, Charles William Bigge, Thomas Headlam and James Losh tired of Grey's tentative approach, by the 1810s.

== Local affairs, 1815–1830 ==
After the Peterloo Massacre, Fenwick was one of a County Durham group calling for investigation, by asking the High Sheriff of Durham, William Keppel Barrington, to convene a meeting. John Davison, rector of Washington, addressed an open letter to Fenwick on the matter, the same year. It argued that public opinion was already revising its view of the event. On the other hand the Peterloo issue and polarisation around it played an important part in the 1820 general election in County Durham, particularly in the hands of John George Lambton—"Radical Jack"—who became the Earl of Durham; Fenwick was his good friend.

In 1822 the campaign of Thomas Joplin, from Newcastle, against the monopoly of the Bank of England, gained support in County Durham. Fenwick was one of the local group calling for Joplin's banking theories to be given attention. It included also George Barrington who was rector of Sedgefield, and the landowner Edward Shipperdson.

Fenwick was a Vice-President of the Newcastle Society for Promoting the gradual Abolition of Slavery throughout the British Dominions. The national Anti-Slavery Society ran campaigns to end British slavery in 1823 and 1826, in which James Losh and Fenwick spoke at local meetings. Fenwick spoke at an emancipation meeting in 1826, in the Durham Town Hall, with others, including Shipperdson.

== Later life ==
In 1834, Fenwick chaired the meeting at which the Surtees Society was formed. Shipperdson, Fenwick and William Nicholas Darnell, rector of Stanhope, made up the Society's initial committee.

Fenwick died at home, on 11 January 1855, in the North Bailey, Durham, aged 93. He was buried in Durham Cathedral, on 17 January.

== Works ==
- Dissertatio Medica Inauguralis, De Plethora (1782)
- Calcareous Manures: Electric Fluids in Vegetation (1798), two essays. These were papers read to the Literary and Philosophical Society of Newcastle upon Tyne.
- Sketch of the Professional life and character of John Clark, M.D. (1806), memoir of John Clark.
- On the Use of Oil of Turpentine in taenia (1811), letter communicated by Matthew Baillie, in Medical-Churgical Transactions vol. II.

Fenwick has been identified as the person behind the pseudonym "Ralph Bigod" in an essay by Charles Lamb. But this applied to another radical, John Fenwick (died 1823).

== Family ==
Fenwick married in 1812 Dorothy Spearman (died 1838), daughter of Robert Spearman of Old Acres. Shortly after the marriage, he retired from medical practice. His heir was his nephew Thomas James Fenwick M.D. (died 1868).
