= James Stow =

English engraver

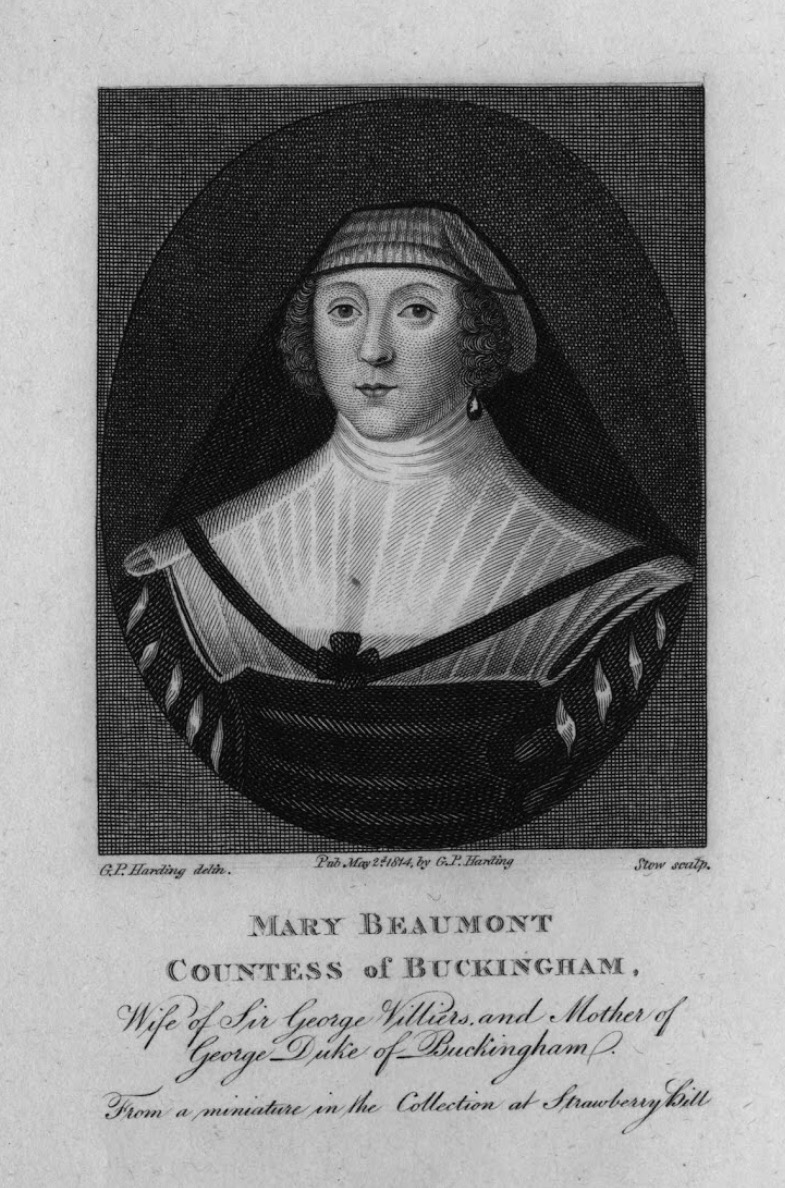
Mary Villiers, Countess of Buckingham, engraved by Stow after George Perfect Harding, 1814

James Stow (born. c. 1770, died in or after 1823), was an English engraver.

== Life ==
Born near Maidstone about 1770, the son of a labourer. At the age of thirteen he is said to have engraved a plate from Bartolomé Esteban Murillo's St. John and the Lamb, which showed such precocious talent that a group of local gentry provided funds for him to move to London and study for William Woollett, one of the leading engravers of the time. After Woollett's death in 1785, he completed his apprenticeship with William Sharp.

Stow is said to have fallen into dissipated habits; he died in obscurity and poverty.

== Works ==
Stow worked entirely as a line engraver. He engraved many of the plates for the Boydell Shakespeare Gallery, after paintings by British artists. He also produced engravings as illustrations for other publications, among them Robert Bowyer's edition of David Hume's History of England(1806), Thomas Macklin's Illustrated Bible (1791–1800), F. J. du Roveray's edition of Alexander Pope's translation of The Odyssey of Homer, and George Perfect Harding's series of portraits of the deans of Westminster (1822), as well as other publications.

Stow's most important single plates were The Three Women at the Sepulchre, after Benjamin West, which he issued himself; and a portrait of Lord Frederick Campbell, after Henry Edridge. His latest employment was upon the illustrations to Robert Wilkinson's Londina Illustrata (1811–1823).
