= Durham Town Hall =

Municipal building in Durham, County Durham, England

- Durham Town Hall

- Shown in County Durham
- 54.7773°N 1.5757°W
- Location: Market Place, Durham

History
- Built: 1665; extended 1851

Site notes
- Architect: Philip Charles Hardwick
- Architectural style: Perpendicular style

Listed Building – Grade II*
- Designated: 19 February 1970
- Reference no.: 1160184

Durham Town Hall is a municipal building in the Market Place, Durham, England. It is a Grade II* listed building.

== History ==
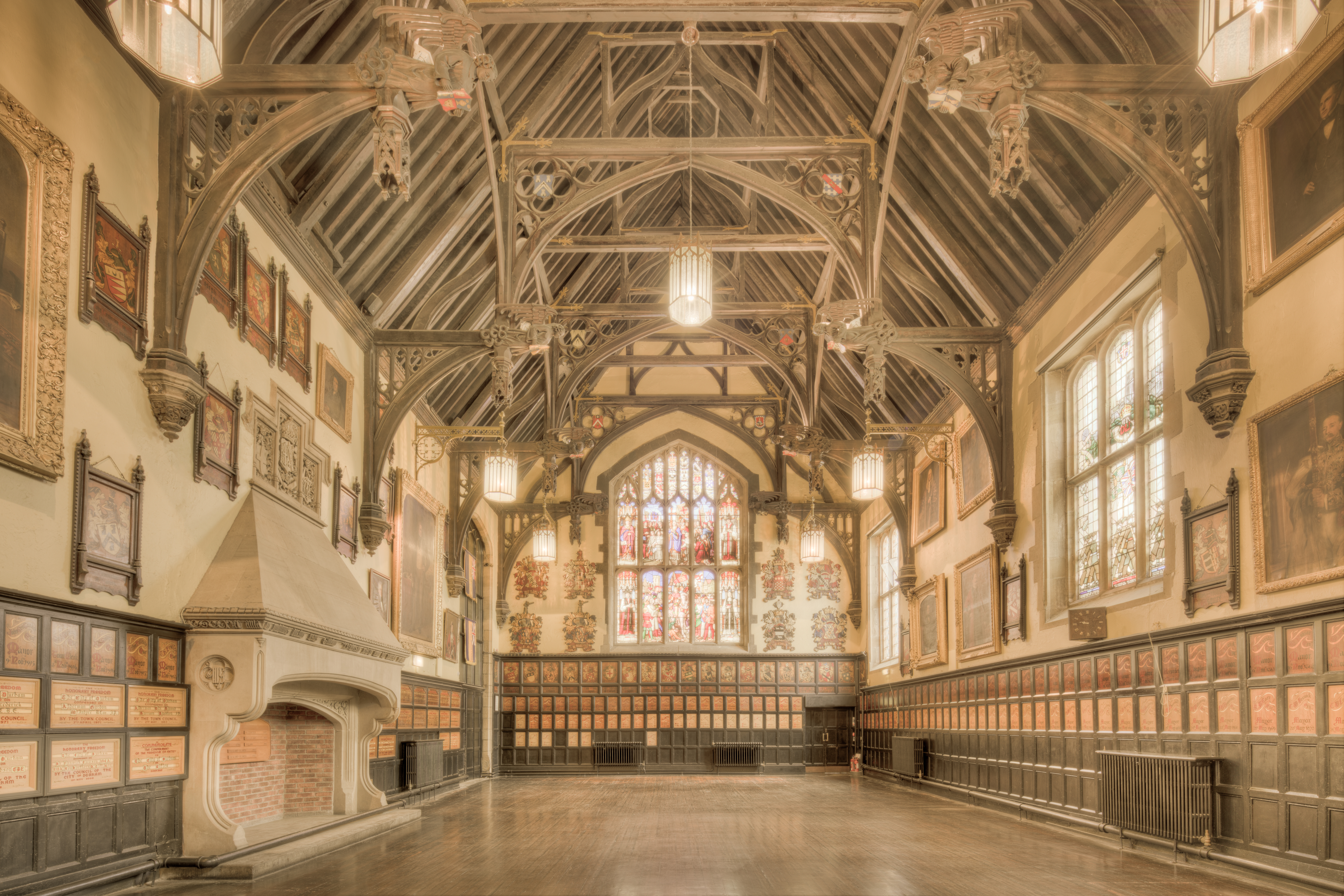
The Great Hall

The current complex replaced an earlier timber guildhall on the site which was built in 1356 and replaced by a stone structure commissioned by Bishop Cuthbert Tunstall in 1535. The earliest part of the current facility is the guildhall which was commissioned by Bishop John Cosin and dates back to 1665. The town hall was extended in 1752, when George Bowes, the mayor, commissioned extensive alterations to the mayor's parlor. The facade of the town hall was completely refaced in 1754. John Fenwick, a leading abolitionist, spoke at an emancipation meeting held in the hall in 1826.

The complex was extended to the west, i.e. the rear of the guildhall, to create a town hall, which was designed by Philip Charles Hardwick in the Perpendicular style, in 1851. The Great Hall inside the complex is 72 feet (22 m) long, is richly panelled and has a hammerbeam roof which is 56 feet (17 m) high. The walls of the Great Hall are lined with wooden plaques commemorating some of freemen of the City of Durham including the footballer Sir Bobby Robson, the writer Bill Bryson and the cleric Archbishop Desmond Tutu.

The complex also includes the council chamber which was the meeting place of the municipal borough of Durham and Framwelgate until 1974 and then of Durham District until it was dissolved in 2009; it remains the meeting place of the mayor and aldermen of Durham, who are now appointed by charter trustees. The adjoining indoor markets, which were built around and underneath the town hall complex, opened on 18 December 1852. Further alterations were made in 2008 including a new public entrance, disabled access and fire protection throughout the complex installed at a cost of £0.8 million.

The facility, which was opened to public viewing in November 2018, includes a case displaying some of the belongings of Józef Boruwłaski, a court dwarf known as "the Little Count" who wrote the "Memoirs of Count Boruwlask", an autobiography of his life. It also contains the original city charter, the city's civic sword and the pikes of the mayor's personal bodyguard. The scabbard of the civic sword is described as being "of purple velvet, the colour of the old palatine of Durham".

== Gallery ==
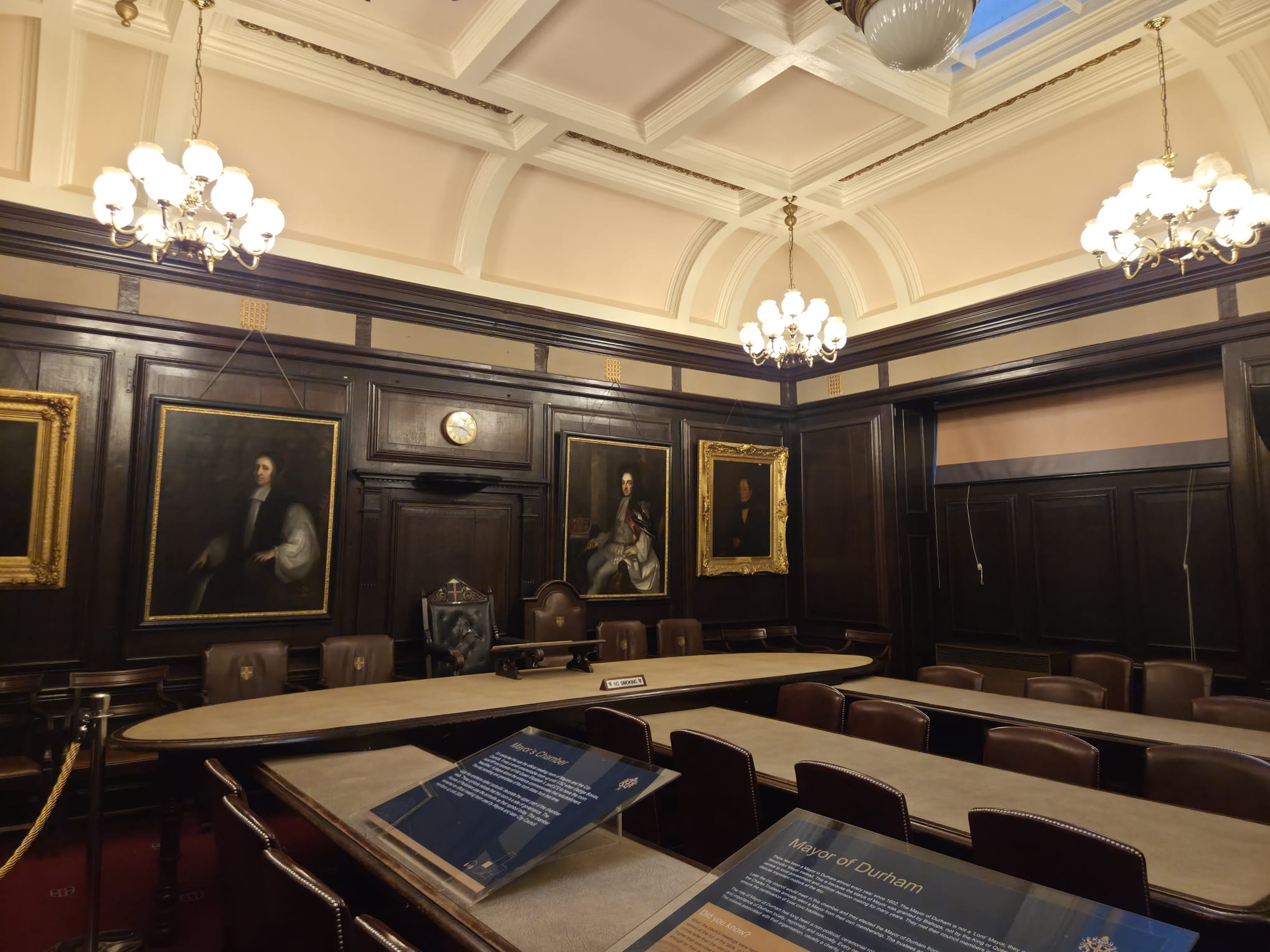
Durham Town Hall Mayor's Chamber, showing the mayor's chair

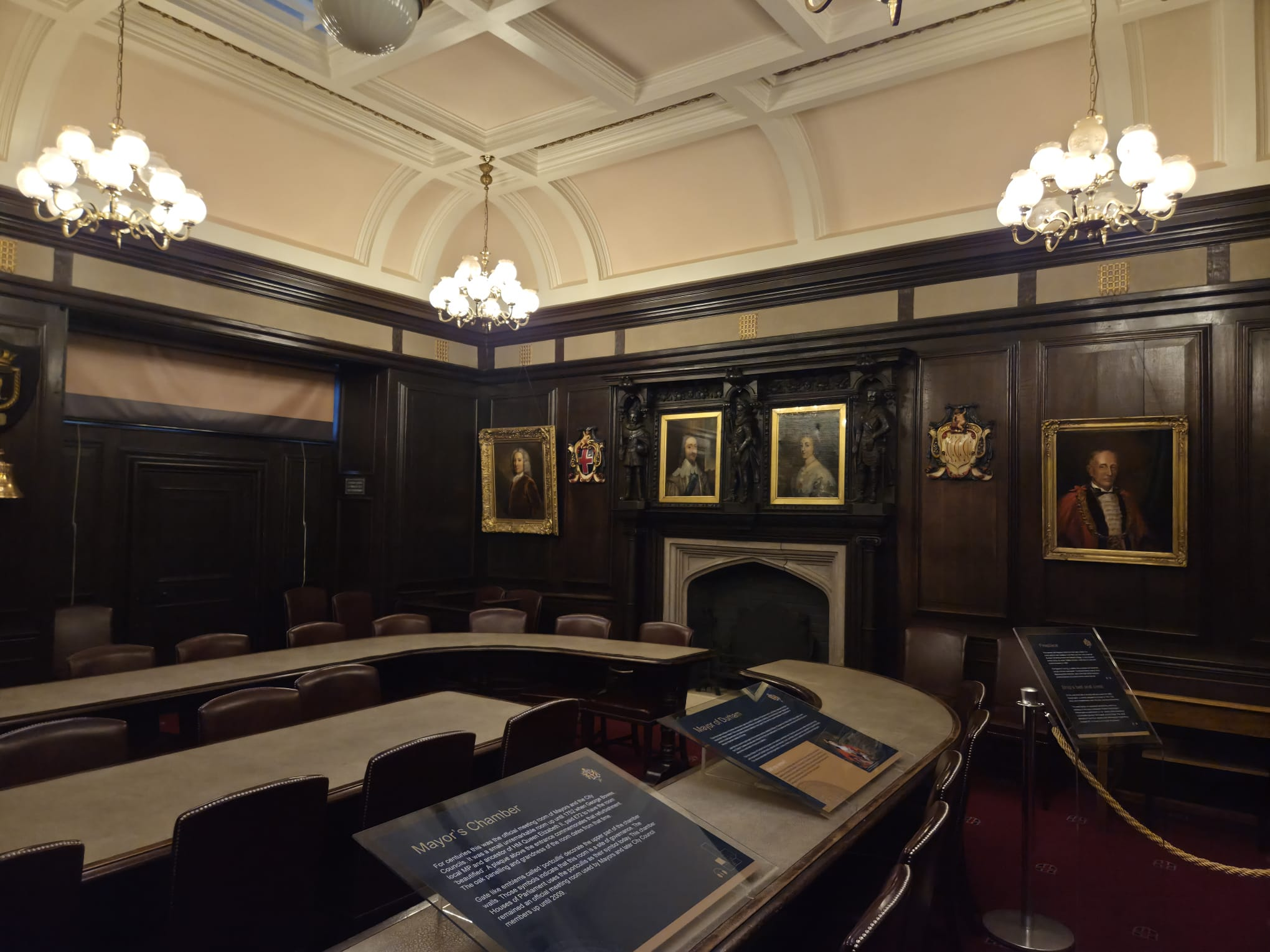
Durham Town Hall Mayor's Chamber, showing one side of the room

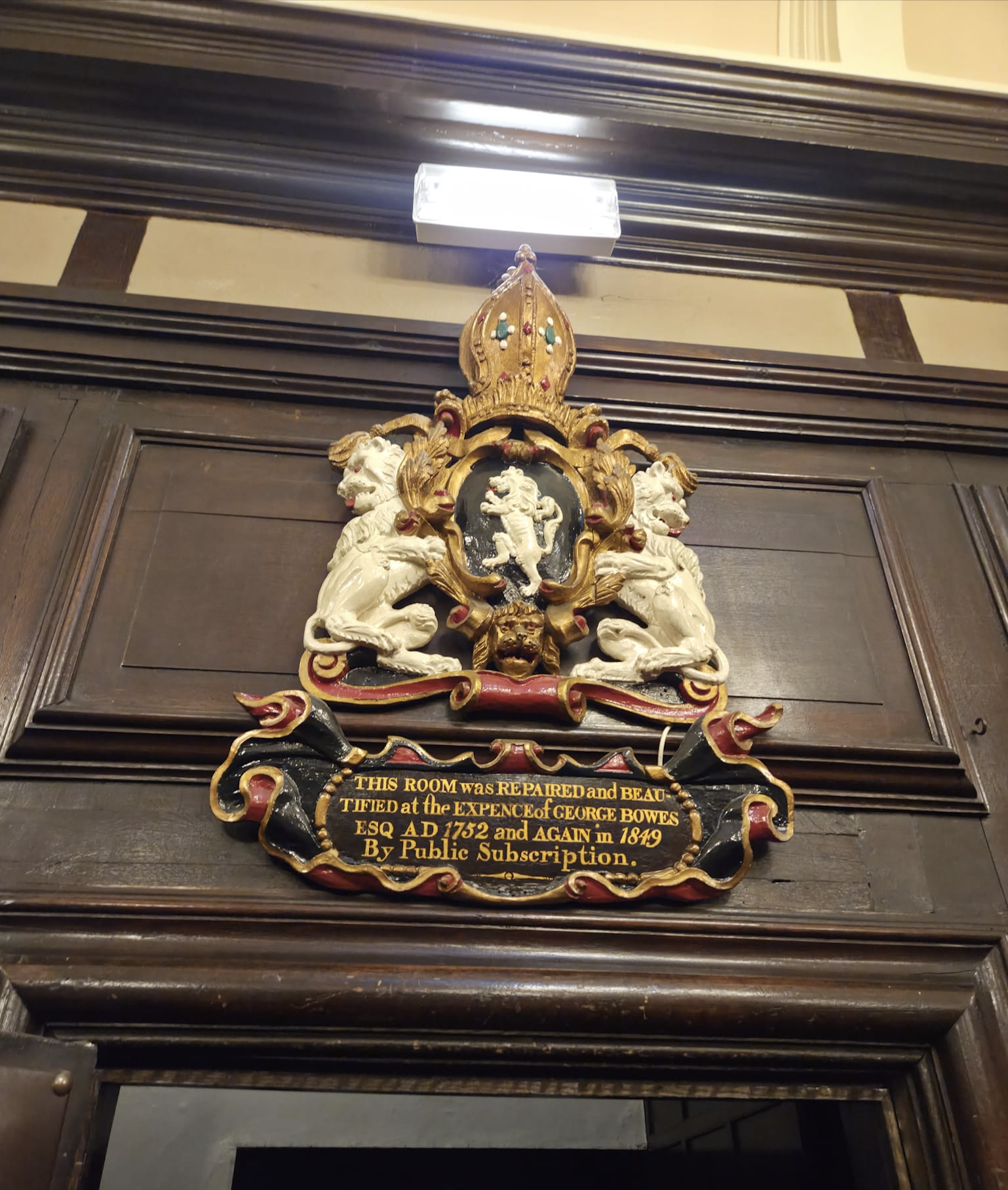
Commemoration plaque in Durham Town hall's Mayor's chamber, commemorating the room's 'beautification'

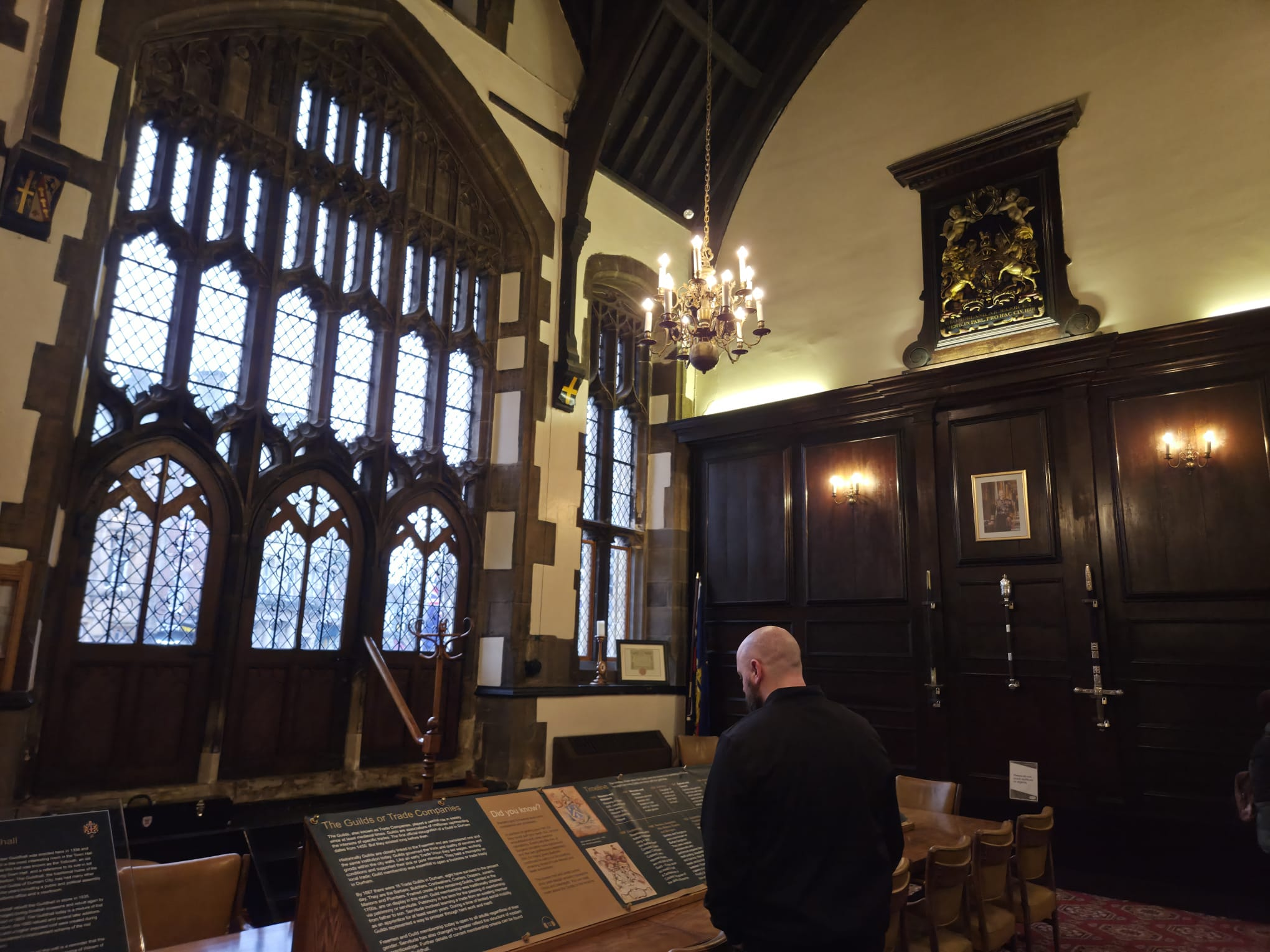
Durham Town Hall Guild Hall, showing portrait of the king and scepter.

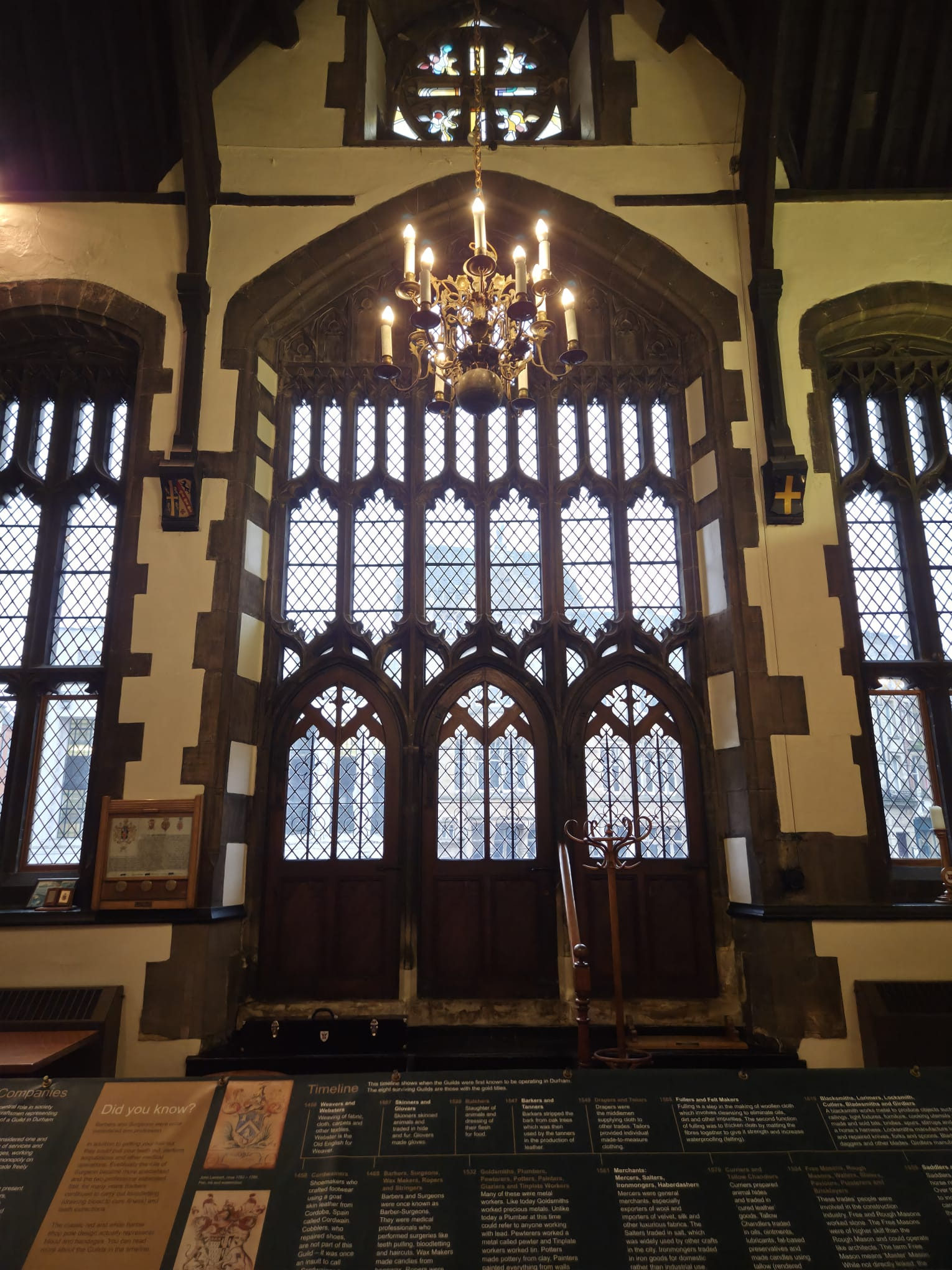
Durham Town Hall Guildhall Main window.

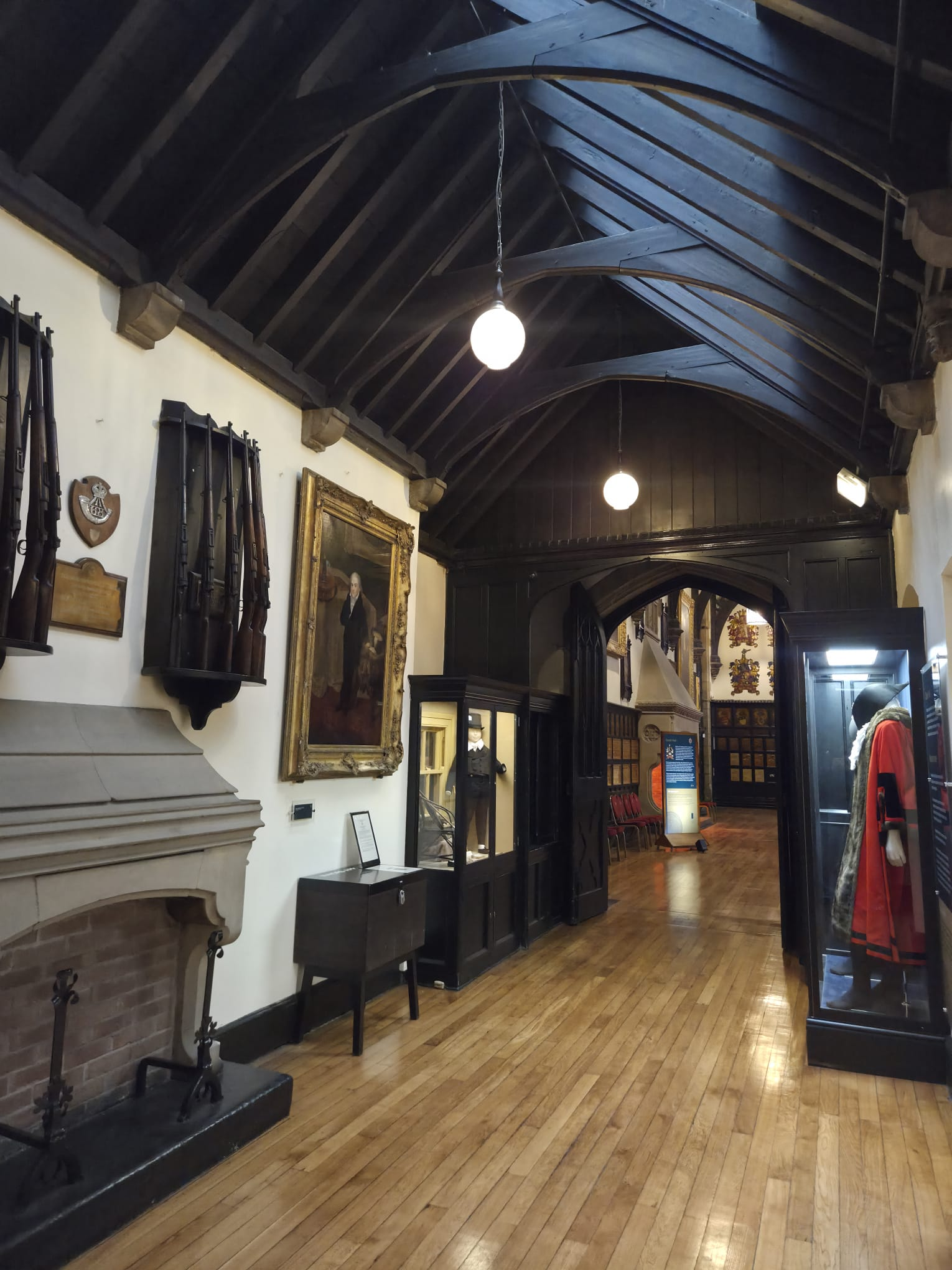
The Crush Hall.

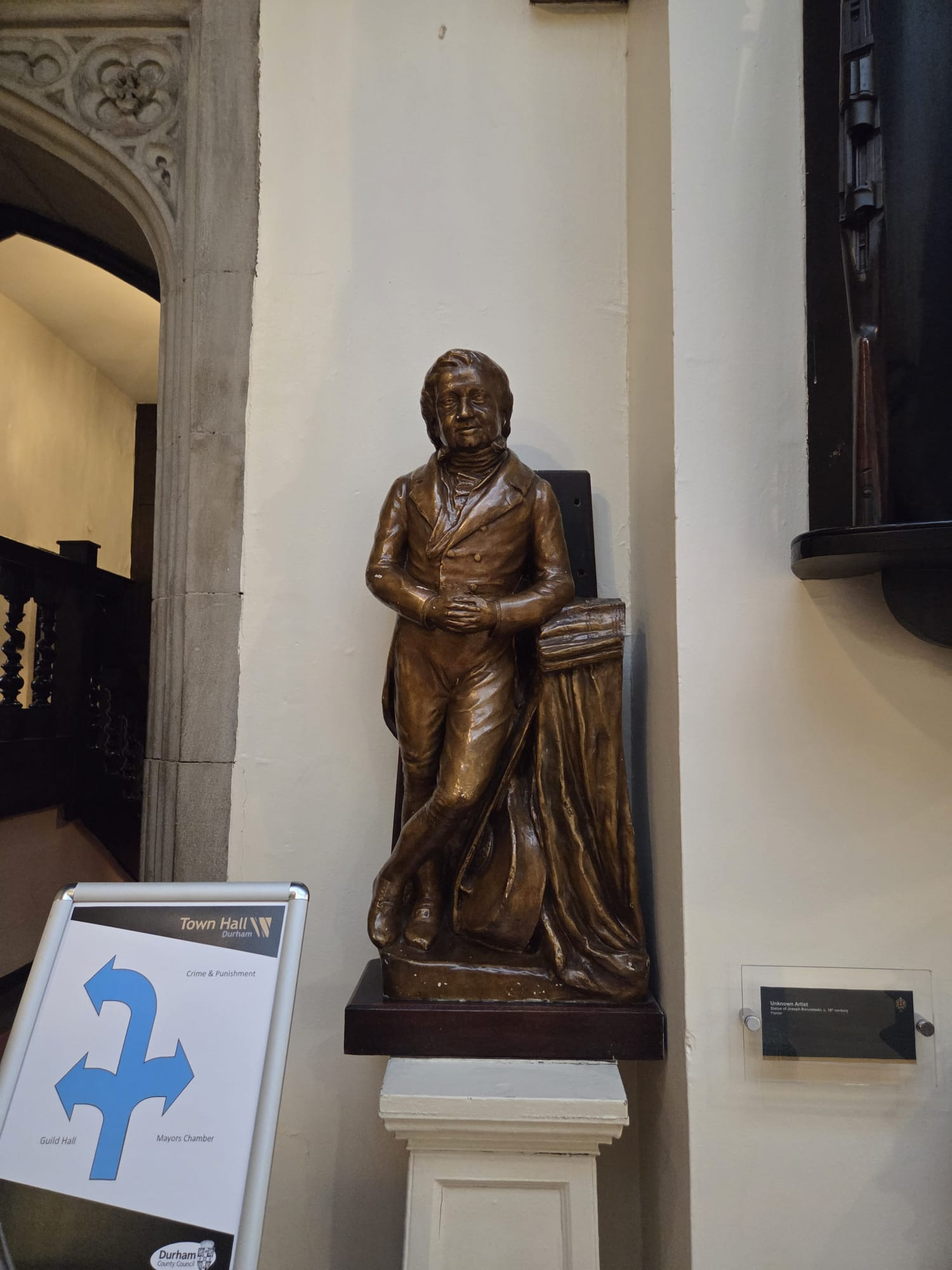
The Statue of Jozef Boruwlaski

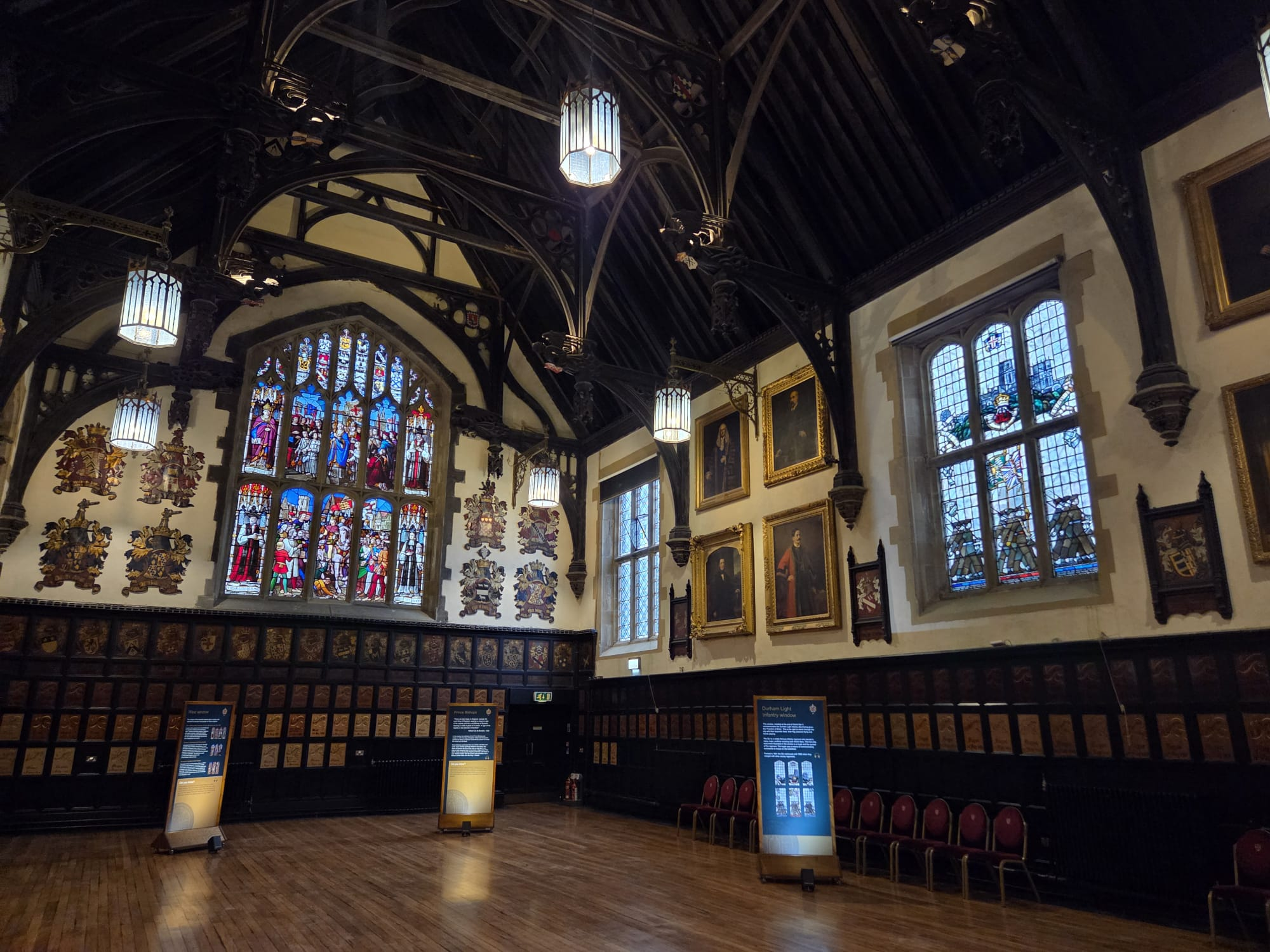
The Great Hall showing the DLI and West Window

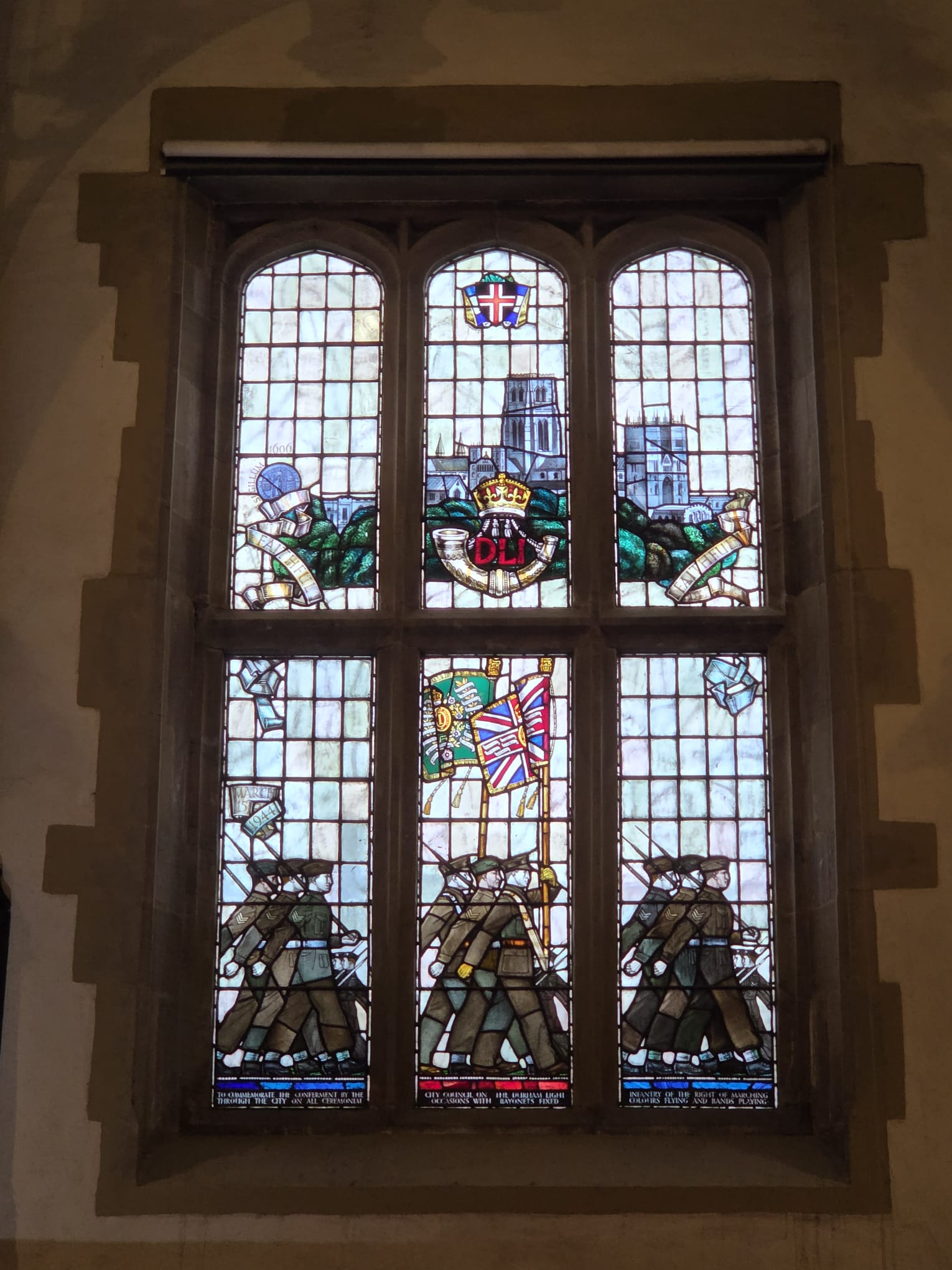
The DLI Window.

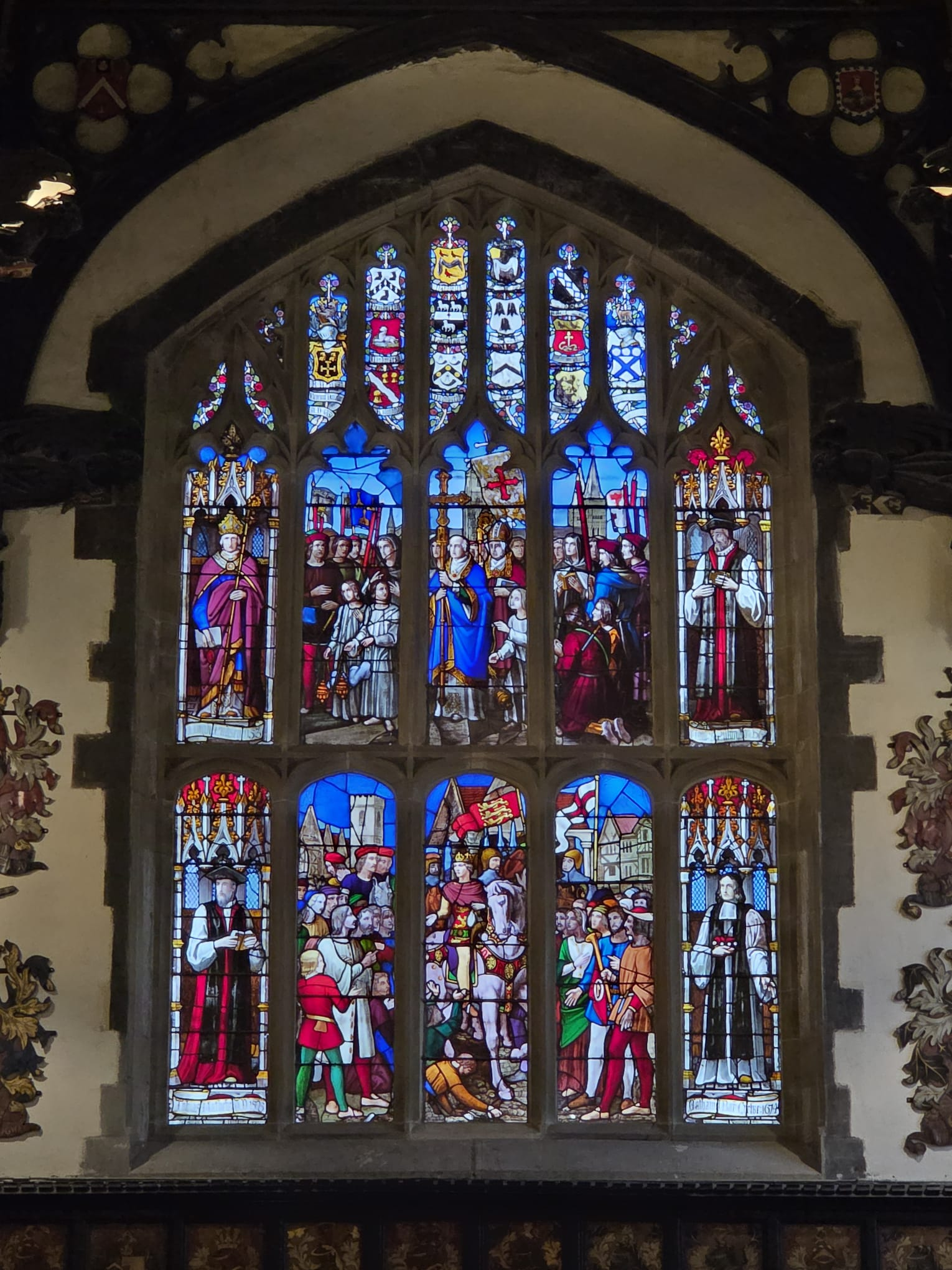
The West Window.

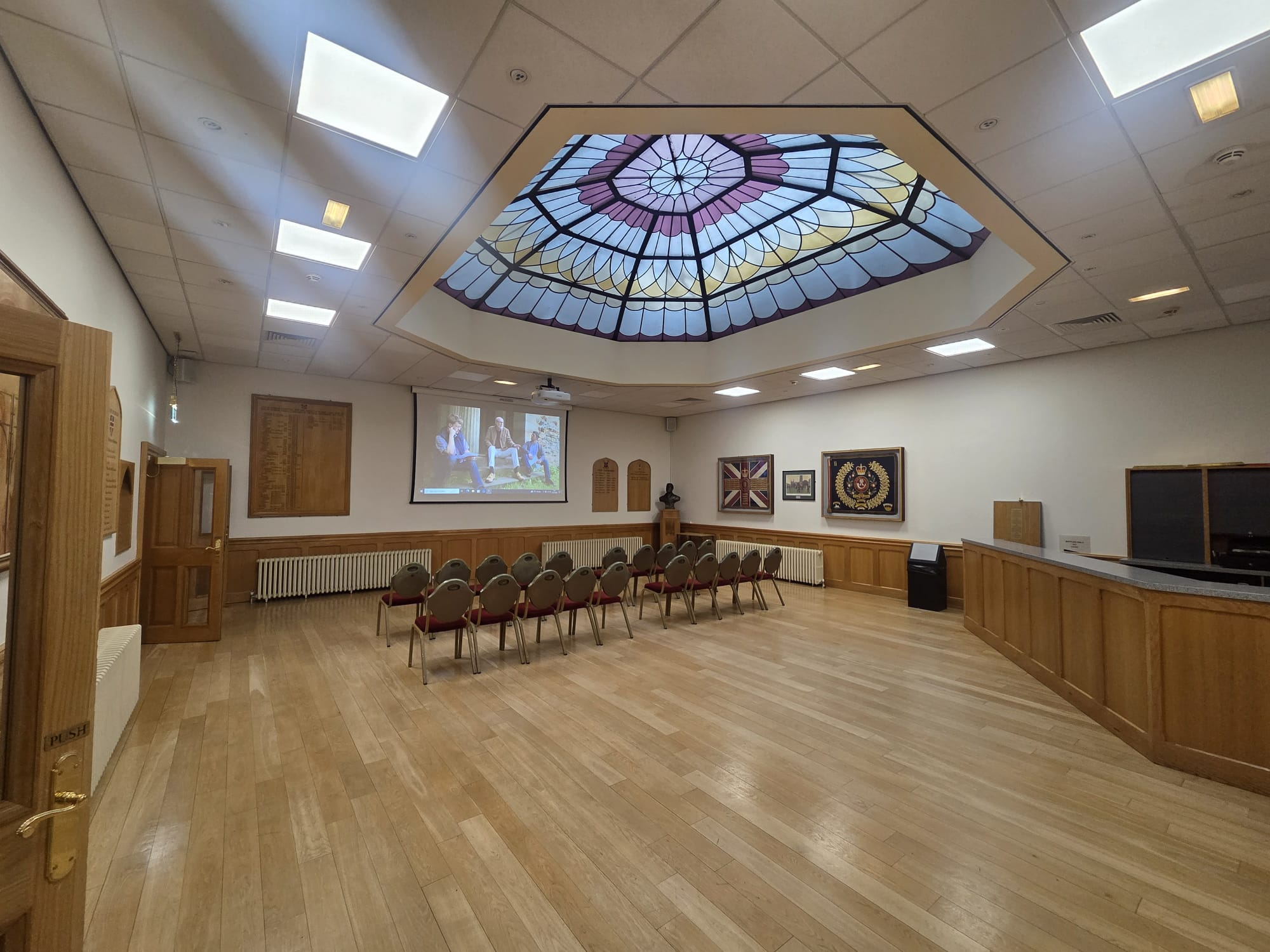
The Lantern Room.

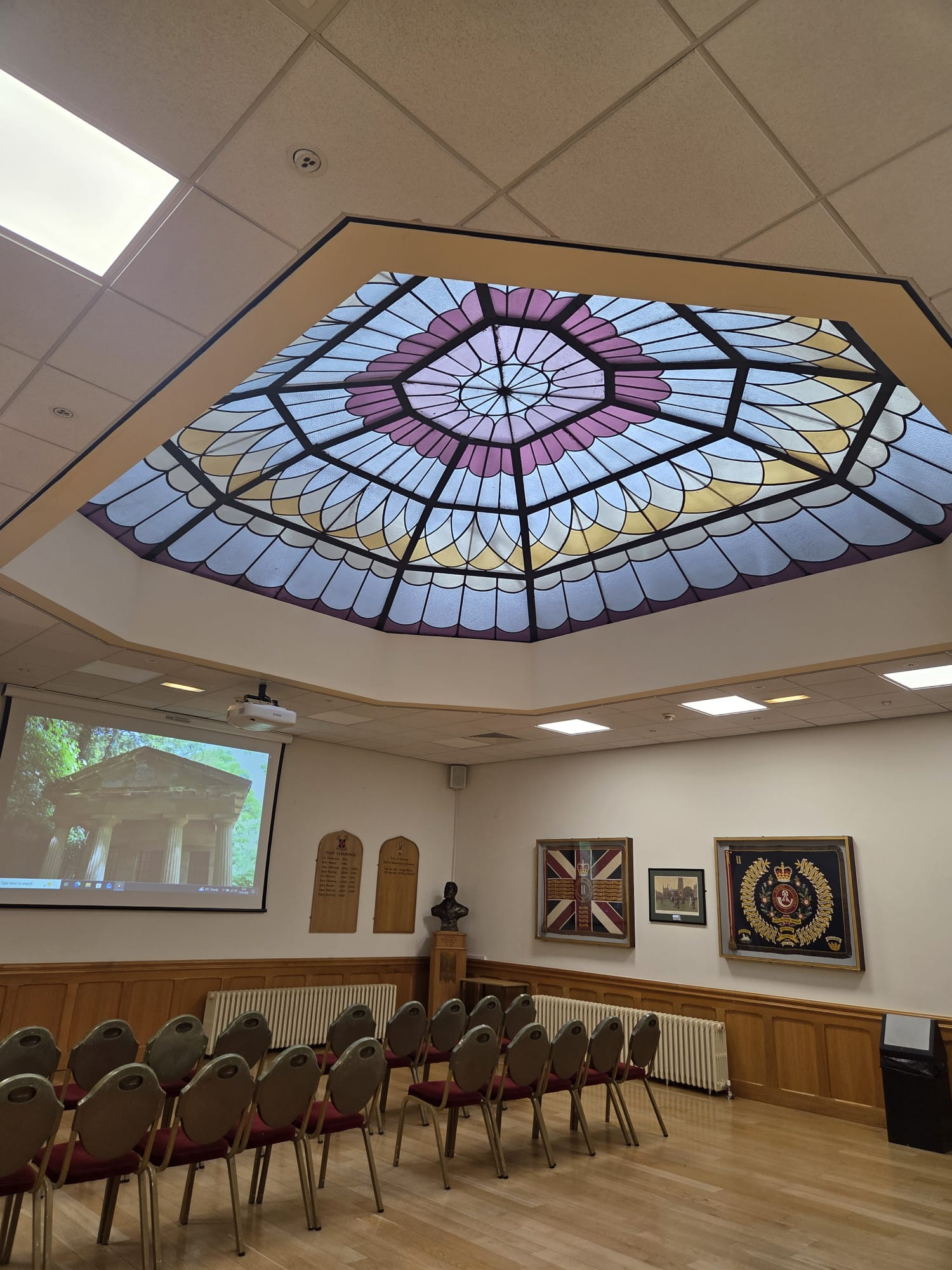
The roof of the Lantern Room.

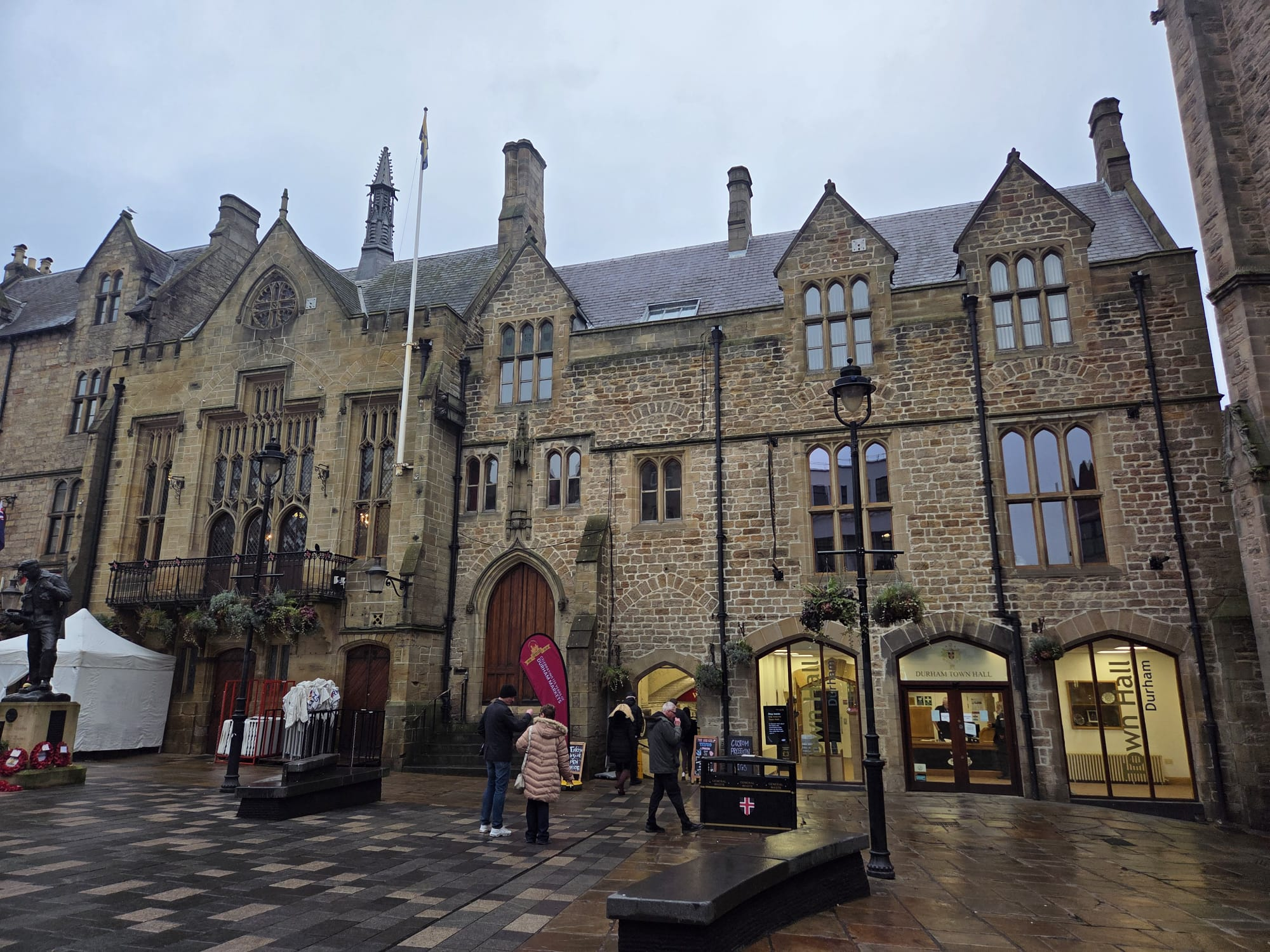
A view of the Town Hall from the outside, showing the current entrance.
