= James Robinson Scott =

Scottish naval surgeon and amateur botanist

James Robinson Scott FRSE FLS PRMS (died 1821) was an 18th/19th century Scottish naval surgeon and amateur botanist. He served as Senior President of the Royal Medical Society 1818/19.

== Life ==
He was born in Edinburgh around 1763.

He studied medicine at the University of Edinburgh and later lectured in botany there. He became a full surgeon in the Royal Navy, serving throughout the Napoleonic Wars.

He reappears in Edinburgh in 1818 living at 18 St Patrick Square.

In 1819 he joined the Wernerian Natural History Society in Edinburgh alongside his colleague Dr Walter Oudney and Henry Dewar, Robert Kaye Greville and George Dunbar.

In 1820 he was elected a Fellow of the Royal Society of Edinburgh. His proposers were Prof George Dunbar, Robert Jameson and Patrick Neill. He lived his final years at 24 Clerk Street in Edinburgh's South Side. He died in London on 29/30 August 1821.

== Family ==
His wife Margaret died in Hertford in 1857, aged 87.

== Publications ==
- Observations on the Character and Writings of the Late William Royston FLS (1817)
- Herbarium Edinense: Dried Specimens of Plants Growing Chiefly in the Edinburgh Area (1819) co-written with Dr William Jameson
