= James Dixon Boyd =

Professor of anatomy at Cambridge University

James Dixon Boyd (29 September 1907 – 7 February 1968) was Professor of Anatomy at Cambridge University and a Fellow of Clare College. Born in New York, USA in 1907 to James Dickson Boyd and Grace Smythe, he would move with his father to his homeplace in County Antrim, United Kingdom in 1917.

In 1933 he married Amélie Loewenthal; Sir Robert Boyd is their son.
