= Walter Oudney =

Scottish physician, naturalist and African explorer

Walter Oudney (1790 – 12 January 1824) was a Scottish medical doctor, naturalist and briefly African explorer.

== Biography ==
He received a medical doctorate at Edinburgh in 1817. In 1819 he became a member of the Wernerian Natural History Society alongside his friend and colleague James Robinson Scott.

Oudney has been described as quiet, self-effacing, and a short man with a weak constitution particularly unsuited to the rigors of African exploration. He was also brave and resolute.

== Bornu Mission ==
After the failure of Joseph Ritchie's expedition, John Barrow heard about Oudney though a botanist friend, and asked Oudney if he would mount a "Mission" from Tripoli southward to the Kingdom of Bornu near Lake Chad. With the intention of discovering if the Niger River flowed into Lake Chad or continued further east possibly merging with the Nile. In early 1822, he departed from Tripoli with explorers Dixon Denham (1786–1828) and Hugh Clapperton (1788–1827), reaching Bornu in February 1823, and thus becoming the first Europeans to accomplish a north–south crossing of the Sahara Desert.

Stricken by illness, Oudney died on 12 January 1824 in the village of Murmur, located near the town of Katagum. On the journey he collected regional plants, and after his death Scottish botanist Robert Brown (1773–1858) named the botanical genus Oudneya from the family Brassicaceae in his honor.

In 1826 the two-volume "Narrative of Travels and Discoveries in Northern and Central Africa in the years 1822, 1823, and 1824" was published, describing the African exploits of Oudney, Denham and Clapperton.
