= Robert Boyd (paediatrician) =

British paediatrician

Sir Robert Boyd FRCP, FFPH, FRCPCH, FMedSci
- Born: Robert David Hugh Boyd; 14 May 1938 (age 87)
- Occupation: Paediatrician
- Parent: James Dixon Boyd

Sir Robert David Hugh Boyd (born 14 May 1938) is a British paediatrician and head of research and Development for Greater Manchester NHS. From 1989 to 1993 he was Dean of the Medical School and Professor of Paediatrics at the University of Manchester. From 1993 to 1996 he was Chair of the Manchester Health authority. He was Principal of St George's Hospital Medical School, University of London, 1996–2003, and Pro-Vice-Chancellor of the University of London from 2000 to 2003. He was made a Knight Bachelor in 2004. He is the son of James Dixon Boyd.

== Publications ==
- Placental Transfer-Methods and Interpretations (co-ed., 1981),
- Perinatal Medicine (co-ed., 1983),
- Paediatric Problems in General Practice (jtly, 1989, 3rd ed. 1997),
- Placenta (ed., 1989–95)
