= Professor of Anatomy (Cambridge) =

Chair at the University of Cambridge

The chair of the Professor of Anatomy at the University of Cambridge was founded by the university in 1707. In 1924, the scope of the professorship was extended from purely human anatomy to cover the anatomy of all vertebrates, as well as embryology.

== Professors of Anatomy ==
1. George Rolfe (1707)
2. John Morgan (1728)
3. George Cuthbert (1734)
4. Robert Bankes (1735)
5. William Gibson (1746)
6. Charles Collignon (1753)
7. Sir Busick Harwood (1785)
8. John Haviland (1814)
9. William Clark (1817–1866)
10. George Humphry (1866)
11. Alexander MacAlister (1883–1919)
12. James Thomas Wilson (1920)
13. Henry Harris (1934)
14. James Dixon Boyd (1951)
15. Richard John Harrison (1968)
16. Hans Kuypers (1984–1989)
17. Raymond Lund (1992–1995)
18. Bill Harris (1997)
19. Ewa Paluch (2018)
