= Francis Godolphin Waldron =

English writer and actor (1744–1818)

Francis Godolphin Waldron (1744–1818) was an English writer and actor, known also as an editor and bookseller.

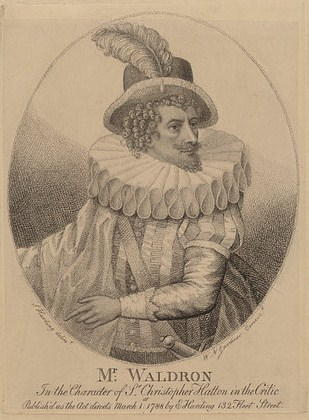
Francis Godolphin Waldron, 1788 engraving as Sir Christopher Hatton in The Critic, engraved by William Nelson Gardiner after Silvester Harding

== Life ==
Waldron became a member of David Garrick's company at Drury Lane, and is heard of on 21 October 1769, when he played a part in A New Way to Pay Old Debts. On 12 March 1771 he was Dicky in The Constant Couple by George Farquhar. He made little progress as an actor, but Garrick gave him charge of the theatrical fund which he established in 1766, and he was at various times manager of the Windsor, Richmond, and other country theatres. Waldron sold the Windsor theatre, which amounted to a shed, to the manager Henry Thornton in 1791.

On 25 April 1772 Waldron was the original Sir Samuel Mortgage in George Downing's Humours of the Turf. On 17 May 1773 he took a benefit, as the original Metre, a parish clerk, in his own The Maid of Kent (published 1778), a comedy based on a story in The Spectator (No. 123). On 12 May 1775, for his benefit and that of a Mrs. Greville, he produced his Contrast, or the Jew and Married Courtezan, played once only and not printed. Tribulation in The Alchemist followed, and on 22 or 23 March 1776 he was the original Sir Veritas Vision in William Heard's Valentine's Day. His Richmond Heiress, a comedy altered from Thomas D'Urfey, unprinted, was acted at Richmond in 1777, probably during his management of the theatre. On 19 February 1778 he was, at Drury Lane, the first Cacafatadri in Abraham Portal's Cady of Bagdad. He also played Shallow in the Merry Wives of Windsor. His Imitation, a comedy that remained unprinted, was brought out at Drury Lane for his benefit on 12 May 1783 and coldly received: it was a reversal of The Beaux' Stratagem with women substituted for men and men for women. Waldron played Justice Clack in the Ladies' Frolic (an adaptation of the Jovial Crew of Richard Brome).

Waldron was a friend of Peter Whalley, and concealed him at a time when he had money troubles. He began to part-publish a revised edition of Whalley's Ben Jonson edition, but it was cut short after two numbers.

At the Haymarket Waldron was the first Sir Matthew Medley in Prince Hoare and Stephen Storace's My Grandmother on 16 December 1793. He was still occasionally seen at Drury Lane, where he played Elbow in Measure for Measure, and the Smuggler in The Constant Couple. On 9 June 1795 he was, at the Haymarket, the first Prompter in George Colman's New Hay at the Old Market. For his benefit on 21 September were produced Love and Madness, adapted by him from Fletcher's Two Noble Kinsmen, and Tis a wise Child knows its own Father, a three-act comedy also by him. Neither piece was printed.

Until near the end of his life Waldron made an occasional appearance at the Haymarket, at which, as young Waldron, his son also appeared, his name being found to Malevole, a servant, in George Moultrie's False and True, Haymarket, 11 August 1798.

Waldron died in March 1818, probably at his house in Drury Lane.

== Works ==
In 1783 Waldron published An Attempt to continue and complete the justly admired Pastoral of the Sad Shepherd of Ben Jonson. The King in the Country, a two-act piece, 1789, is an alteration of the underplot of Thomas Heywood's King Edward the Fourth. It was played at Richmond and Windsor in 1788, after the return of George III from Cheltenham, and is included by Waldron in his Literary Museum. Heigho for a Husband, 1794, was a rearrangement of the Imitation; it was more successful than the previous piece, was played at the Haymarket on 14 July 1794, and was revived at Drury Lane in 1802. Its appearance had been preceded on 2 December 1793 at the Haymarket by the Prodigal, 1794, an alteration of The Fatal Extravagance of Aaron Hill, with a happy ending. In its preface Waldron says he made the alteration for George Colman the Younger.

The Virgin Queen in five acts, a sequel to The Tempest, was printed in 1797, but not acted. The Man with two Wives, or Wigs for Ever, 1798, was acted probably in the provinces. The Miller's Maid, a comic opera in two acts, songs only printed with the cast, was performed at the Haymarket on 25 August 1804, with music by John Davy. Based on a Rural Tale by Robert Bloomfield, it was played for Sarah Harlowe's benefit, and was a success.

In 1789 Waldron brought out an edition of John Downes's Roscius Anglicanus with notes. From 54 Drury Lane he issued in 1792 The Literary Museum, or Ancient and Modern Repository, also published with another title-page as The Literary Museum, or a Selection of Scarce Old Tracts, an antiquarian work. He followed this up with the Shakspearean Miscellany (London, 1802, four parts), a second collection of scarce tracts, mainly from manuscripts in his possession, with notes by himself and portraits of actors, poems (then unpublished) by John Donne and Richard Corbet, and other works. Waldron also wrote or compiled:

- the lives in the Biographical Mirrour (3 vols. 1795–8),
- Free Reflections on Miscellaneous Papers and Legal Instruments under the hand and seal of W. Shakespeare in the possession of S. Ireland (1796) on the Ireland Shakespeare forgeries,
- A Compendious History of the English Stage (1800) compiled from other writers,
- A Collection of Miscellaneous Poetry (1802),
- The Celebrated Romance intituled Rosalynde. Euphues Golden Legacie (1802), with notes forming a supplement to the Shakspearean Miscellany, and
- a notice of Thomas Davies in John Nichols's Literary Anecdotes.

Eight numbers of a newspaper How Do You Do appeared in 1796, the joint work of Waldron and Charles Dibdin.

== Family ==
Waldron lived with Sarah Harlowe from about 1796. They had four children.
