= Raymond Lund =

British anatomist (born 1940)

Raymond Douglas Lund (born 10 February 1940) is a British anatomist. He was a professor of ophthalmology at the John Moran Eye Center (University of Utah).

He was previously professor of anatomy at the University of Cambridge. He was also a professor at the University of Washington, The Medical University of South Carolina, and the University of Pittsburgh.

He has studied the fine detail of sensory pathways in the brains of mammals, and was the first person to demonstrate that transplants of neural cells can rewire into the recipient's brain, meaning that stem cell implants have the potential to treat some forms of blindness, such as age-related macular degeneration and retinitis pigmentosa. (Transplanted neural tissue develops connections with host rat brain. Lund RD, Hauschka SD. Science. 1976 Aug 13;193(4253):582-4. doi: 10.1126/science.959815). He also made important contributions to understanding the abnormal connections in the visual pathways of albino animals. (Uncrossed Visual Pathways of Hooded and Albino Rats. Lund RD. Science. 1965 Sep 24;149(3691):1506-7. doi: 10.1126/science.149.3691.1506). In 1978 he published an influential text book on developmental neuroscience: Development and Plasticity of the Brain: An Introduction, Oxford University Press, ISBN 978-0195023084

He was elected a Fellow of the Royal Society in 1992.
