= George Perfect Harding =

English painter

George Perfect Harding (1781 – 23 December 1853) was an English portrait painter and copyist.

== Life ==
He was a son of Silvester Harding of Pall Mall, London. Adopting his father's profession, he practised miniature-painting, and exhibited at the Royal Academy at intervals between 1802 and 1840; but, like his father, he mainly devoted himself to making water-colour copies of historical portraits.

Harding visited family seats of the nobility, royal palaces, and college halls. He produced highly finished copy portraits. He was elected a fellow of the Society of Antiquaries of London in 1839, but withdrew in 1847. Towards the end of his life he had money troubles, and sold his collections of drawings.

Harding died at Hercules Buildings, Lambeth, where he had resided for more than thirty years, on 23 December 1853. He left a large family by a second wife. His portrait was engraved by J. Brown, from a miniature by himself, in 1826. A collection of his works went to the print room of the British Museum.

== Works ==
In 1822–3 Harding published a series of eighteen portraits of the Deans of Westminster, engraved by James Stow, R. Grave, and others, to illustrate John Preston Neale and Edward Wedlake Brayley's History of Westminster Abbey. This was followed in 1825 by Ancient Oil Paintings and Sepulchral Brasses in the Abbey Church of St. Peter, Westminster, with descriptions by Thomas Moule. Among other historical works to which he supplied the plates was John Heneage Jesse's Memoirs of the Court of England during the Reign of the Stuarts, 1840. He gave much time to the preparation of a manuscript account of the Princes of Wales, illustrated with portraits and heraldic devices.

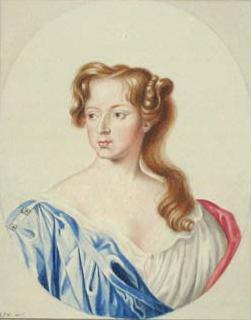
Lady Elizabeth Percy, by Harding

In 1840 Harding took a leading part in establishing the Granger Society, the object of which was the publication of previously unengraved historical portraits; through lack of support the society came to an end, after publishing a few prints, early in 1843. Harding carried on the work on his own account, and during the next five years issued a series of fifteen plates, engraved by Joseph Brown and William Greatbach, with biographical notices by Moule. The copperplates of these afterwards passed into the hands of John Russell Smith of Soho Square, who reissued the work in 1869.
