= Ewa Paluch =

French biophysicist and cell biologist

Ewa Paluch is a French-Polish biophysicist and cell biologist. She is the 17th Professor of Anatomy in the Department of Physiology, Development and Neuroscience and Fellow of Trinity College at the University of Cambridge.

== Education ==
Paluch received her Bachelor of Science degree from Ecole Normale Supérieure de Lyon, France, and her PhD degree in biophysics from Institut Curie and Paris Diderot University, France.

== Career and research ==
After completing her PhD, Paluch was appointed Group Leader at the Max Planck Institute of Molecular Cell Biology and Genetics, Dresden, Germany. Between 2013 and 2019 she worked at University College London, as Professor of Cell Biophysics, and in 2019 became Professor of Anatomy, and fellow of Trinity College, Cambridge. Paluch is the first woman to hold the chair of Professor of Anatomy in its 300-year history. Her work focuses on the cell cortex, a thin network of actin and myosin that lies under the cell membrane and determines the shape of most animal cells. The cortex enables the cell to resist externally applied forces and to exert mechanical work. As such, it plays a role in normal physiology during events involving cell deformation such as cell division and migration, and in diseases such as cancer where cell shape is often deregulated.

== Awards and honours ==
- Laureate in the Life Sciences of the Blavatnik Awards for Young Scientists in the UK, 2019.
- Elected member of the European Molecular Biology Organization (EMBO), 2018.
- Hooke Medal, British Society for Cell Biology, 2017.
- Chair, Mechanobiology Subgroup, Biophysical Society, 2017.
- Philip Leverhulme Prize in Biological Sciences, 2014.
