= Silvester Harding =

English artist and publisher

- Born: 25 July 1745; Newcastle-under-Lyme, Staffordshire, England, UK
- Died: 12 August 1809 (aged 64)
- Known for: Artist and publisher

Silvester Harding (also Sylvester) (25 July 1745 – 12 August 1809) was an English artist and publisher.

== Life ==
Harding was born at Newcastle-under-Lyme, Staffordshire, England, UK, on 25 July 1745. Placed when a child with an uncle in London, at the age of fourteen he ran away and joined a company of actors. In 1775 he returned to London and took to miniature-painting, exhibiting at the Royal Academy of Arts in 1776 and in subsequent years.

In 1786 Harding joined his brother Edward Harding in starting a book and printseller's shop in Fleet Street, London. In 1792 they moved to 102 Pall Mall, where they carried on a successful business. Before 1798, the brothers dissolved their partnership, Silvester moving to 127 and Edward to 98 Pall Mall.

Harding died on 12 August 1809.

== Works ==
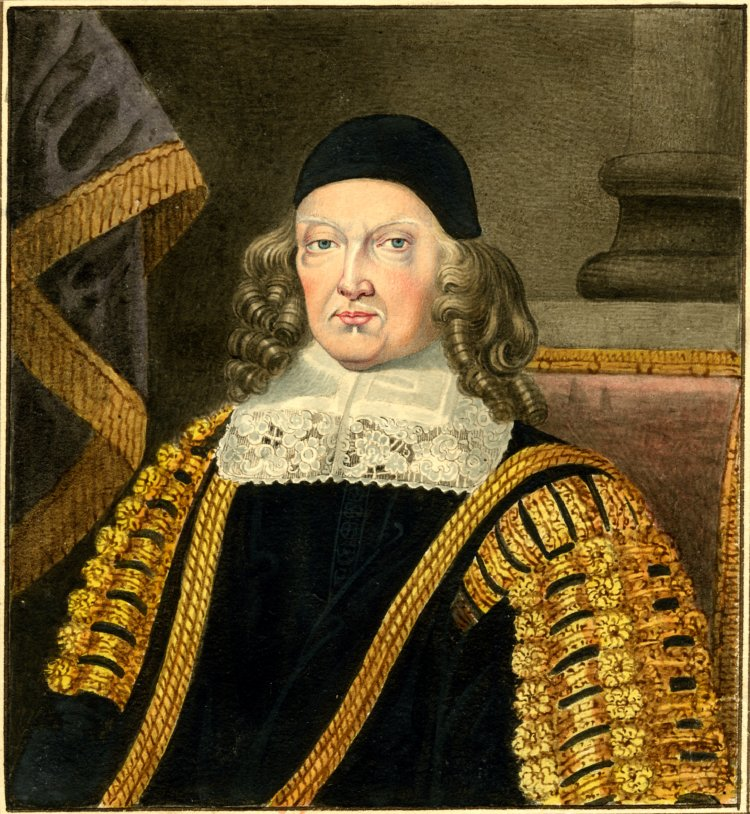
Harding's portrait of Sir Harbottle Grimston, 2nd Baronet (c. 1603–1685), an English politician

The Hardings published many prints of subjects designed by Silvester and engraved by Francesco Bartolozzi, Jean Marie Delattre, William Nelson Gardiner and others. Silvester Harding concentrated on drawing portraits of theatrical celebrities, and copying historical portraits in watercolours which were used to illustrate other works. Their first publication of this kind was Shakespeare illustrated by an Assemblage of Portraits and Views appropriated to the whole suite of our Author's Historical Dramas, consisting of 150 plates, issued in thirty numbers 1789–1793.

They produced also the Memoirs of Count Grammont (1793); The Economy of Human Life (1795) with plates by Gardiner from designs by Harding; Gottfried August Bürger's Leonora (1796) translated by William Robert Spencer; and John Dryden's Fables (1797), both illustrated with plates from drawings by Lady Diana Beauclerk. The first volume of their extensive series of historical portraits, The Biographical Mirrour, with text by Francis Godolphin Waldron, appeared in 1795. Silvester alone continued the Biographical Mirrour, of which he issued the second volume in 1798; the third was ready for publication at the time of his death.

Among other original works by Harding were a portrait of Sir Busick Harwood, M.D., engraved on a large scale in mezzotint by John Jones, and a set of six illustrations to Rosalynde, Euphues Golden Legacie (the original of Shakespeare's As You Like It), with notes by F. G. Waldron, which were engraved and published by his brother Edward in 1802. The largest of his watercolour copies, Charles II receiving the first pine-apple cultivated in England from Rose, the gardener at Dawney Court, Bucks, the seat of the Duchess of Cleveland, from a picture at Strawberry Hill, was engraved by R. Grave in 1823.

Busick Harwood also commissioned Harding to paint miniature watercolours of over 130 members of the University of Cambridge in the 1790s.

== Family ==
Harding married a daughter of Dr. William Perfect of Town Malling, Kent, by whom he had, with other children, George Perfect and Edward; the latter engraved some plates for his father's publications, but died at the age of twenty in 1796.
