= William Clark (anatomist) =

British anatomist

William Clark (5 April 1788 – 15 September 1869) was a British anatomist.

== History ==
Clark was born in Newcastle upon Tyne, a son of John Clark (died 1805). After attending a school at Welton, East Riding of Yorkshire, he matriculated at Trinity College, Cambridge in 1804, graduating B.A. in 1808. He studied medicine in London, graduating M.D. in 1827.

Clark served as Professor of Anatomy, University of Cambridge, from 1817 to 1866, during which time he was responsible for acquisition of an extensive museum of comparative anatomy and laid the foundations for the School of Biological Sciences at Cambridge University. He was elected Fellow of the Royal Society in 1836.

Clark was ordained in 1818. He was rector of Guiseley, Yorkshire, 1826–1859, the duties being carried out by a curate. After suffering a stroke in 1863, he died at home in Cambridge in 1869.

== Bibliography ==
- Analysis of a Course of Lectures on the Anatomy and Physiology of the Human Body, Cambridge (1822)
- A Case of Human Monstrosity, with a Commentary, Transactions of the Cambridge Philosophical Society, iv, pp. 219–255
- Report on Animal Physiology; comprising a Review of the Progress and Present State of Theory, and our Information respecting the Blood and the Powers that Circulate it. Report of the 4th meeting of the BAAS held at Edinburgh in 1834 (London) 1835 p. 95
- Von Baer, Valentin, Wagner, Coste, Eschricht, &c on the Early Development of the Ovum British and Foreign Medical Review. p. 1 (1840)
- Translated Handbook of Zoology 1856–1858 from the Dutch by Jan van der Hoeven into both German and English (1802–1868).
- Catalogue of the Osteological Portion of the Specimens contained in the Anatomical Museum of the University of Cambridge (1862)

== Family ==
Clark married Mary Willis, daughter of Robert Darling Willis M.D. (1760–1821). John Willis Clark was their son.
