= Thomas Trotter (physician) =

Scottish physician and author (1760–1832)

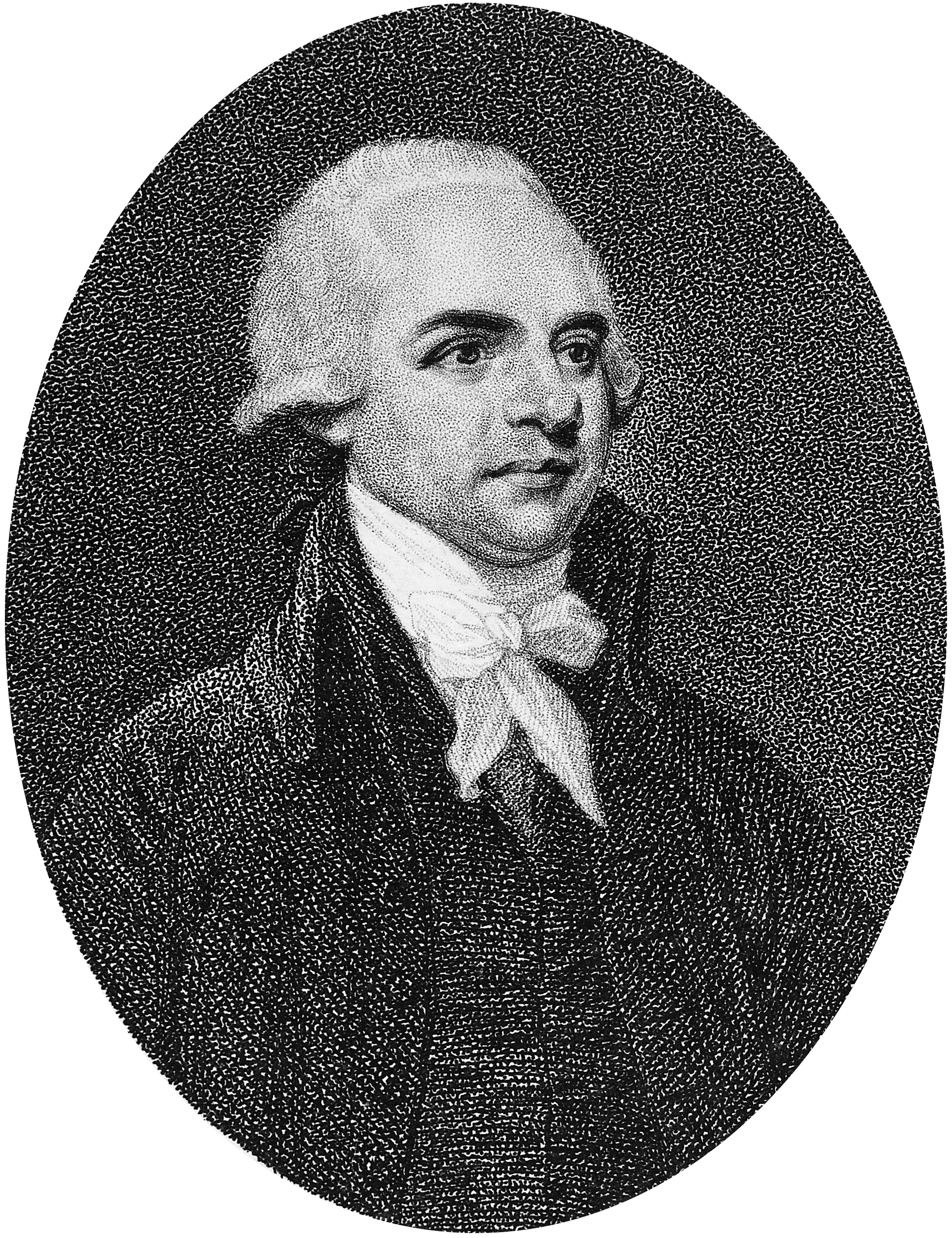
Thomas Trotter, 1796 engraving by Daniel Orme.

Thomas Trotter (1760 – 1832) was a Scottish naval physician and author who was a leading medical reformer in the Royal Navy and an ardent critic of the slave trade. Trotter was born in Melrose, Roxburghshire, and studied medicine under Alexander Monro (secundus) in Edinburgh. His major work, the Medicina Nautica, was published in 1802 and provides a detailed examination of the state of naval medicine during the French Revolutionary Wars.

Trotter was a champion of vaccinations for naval medical staff, and as the Navy's Physician of the Fleet he required that all naval surgeons and assistants be inoculated against smallpox. Influenced by his career in the Royal Navy, Trotter was also a key figure in the development of modern theories of alcohol addiction, describing habitual alcohol consumption as a 'disease of the mind'. After an extensive naval career, Trotter retired to private practice in 1802 and died in 1832.

== Life ==
Trotter was born in Roxburghshire in 1760. He enlisted in the Royal Navy at the age of nineteen and, despite a lack of medical training, was assigned the rank of surgeon's mate aboard the 74-gun ship of the line HMS Berwick. Britain was then at war against the Dutch, French and Spanish, and Trotter saw active service during the Battle of Dogger Bank in 1781, and in the lifting of the Great Siege of Gibraltar in 1782. He was discharged from the Navy in 1783, at the conclusion of the wars.

Unemployed and without family or political connections, Trotter elected to sign on as surgeon aboard a Guineaman, or slaving ship, engaged in the transportation of slaves from Africa to the Caribbean. He later considered this to be the lowest point of his life, and his exposure to the misery of the slaves converted him to the anti-slavery cause. An outbreak of scurvy on board also fixed his attention on the disease.

Trotter pursued medical studies in Edinburgh, and graduated M.D. in 1788. During the Spanish armament of 1790, he was appointed by Vice-admiral Robert Roddam, to be surgeon of his flagship HMS Royal William, and in 1793 was surgeon of HMS Vengeance for a voyage to the West Indies and back. In December he was appointed second physician to the Royal Hospital at Haslar, near Portsmouth, and in April 1794 was nominated by Lord Howe physician to the Channel fleet. In this capacity he served through the campaigns of 1794 and 1795, was present in the battle of 1 June 1794, appears to have been with Cornwallis on 16–17 June 1795, and to have joined the fleet under Lord Bridport very shortly after the action of 23 June. When going on board one of the ships to visit a wounded officer, he was accidentally ruptured, and rendered incapable of further service at sea.

He married Isabella Agnes Dixon (c1777 - 1855) on 25 September 1810 at St John's, Newcastle upon Tyne. They had three children, William Curtis Trotter (1813 - 1855 Sydney, N.S.W.), Thomas Dixon Marr Trotter (1815 - 1858), Alice Alison Trotter (1816 - 1861).

Trotter was granted a pension; he settled in private practice at Newcastle, which he gave up, but continued to write, mostly on professional subjects. He died at Newcastle upon Tyne on 5 September 1832, aged 72 and was buried at St. Mary the Virgin, Stamfordham, Northumberland.

== Publications ==
At the age of 16 Trotter wrote verses which were published in Walter Ruddiman's Edinburgh Magazine in 1777 and 1778. His M.D. dissertation was De Ebrietate ejusque effectibus in corpus humanum, published in English as An Essay, medical, philosophical, and chemical, on Drunkenness, and its Effects on the Human Body (1804; 4th edit. 1812). In England, while in private medical practice at Wooler in Northumberland, he wrote up his notes on scurvy to order, and published them as Observations on the Scurvy (1786; 2nd edit., much enlarged, 1792). Treatment for scurvy had been demonstrated by James Lind in his Treatise of 1754; Trotter corroborated Lind's thesis by extensive observations. In 1795, through Sir Gilbert Blane, the Admiralty endorsed the general use of lemon juice.

Other works were:

- A Review of the Medical Department in the British Navy, with a Method of Reform proposed, 1790.
- Medical and Chemical Essays, containing additional Observations on Scurvy ... 1795; 2nd edit. 1796.
- Medicina Nautica: an Essay on the Diseases of Seamen, vol. i. 1797; vol. ii. 1799; vol. iii. 1803.
- Suspiria Oceani: a Monody on the death of Richard, Earl Howe, 1800.
- An essay, medical, philosophical, and chemical, on drunkenness, and its effects on the human body, 1804.
- A Proposal for destroying the Fire and Choak Damps of Coal Mines ... 1805. This work brought two controversial replies, from Henry Dewar and "A Friend to Rational Schemes of Improvement".
- A Second Address to the Owners and Agents of Coal Mines on destroying the Fire and Choak Damp, 1806.
- A View of the Nervous Temperament; being a Practical Treatise on Nervous, Bilious, Stomach, and Liver Complaints 1807; 2nd edit. 1808.
- The Noble Foundling, or the Hermit of the Tweed: a Tragedy, 1812.
- A practicable Plan for Manning the Royal Navy ... without Impressment. Addressed to Admiral Lord Viscount Exmouth, 1819.
- Sea Weeds: Poems written on various occasions, chiefly during a naval life, 1829.

Trotter contributed also to the European Magazine, Medical Journal and other periodicals.
