= William Nelson Gardiner =

Irish engraver and bookseller

William Nelson Gardiner (1766–1814) was an Irish engraver and bookseller, known for eccentricity.

== Life ==
Born at Dublin on 11 June 1766, he was son of John Gardiner, servant to Judge William Scott, and Margaret Nelson, his wife, a pastrycook. He was educated at Mr. Sisson Darling's academy, and later was, with his father, attached to the suite of Sir James Nugent of Donore, Westmeath. He was supported in artistic studies and after three years at the Dublin Academy earned a silver medal.

Gardiner then went to London to try his fortune, and was at first employed by a Mr. Jones, a maker of profile shadow-portraits. Gardiner also supported himself by portrait-painting, but gave it up for the stage, both as scene-painter and actor. He eventually worked for a Mrs. Beetham, who also made profile shadow-portraits. Meeting Francis Grose the antiquary, he was placed by him with Richard Godfrey, the engraver of the Antiquarian Repertory. He acquired skill as an engraver in the chalk or stipple manner. Sylvester & Edward Harding, publishers in Fleet Street, employed him in engraving plates for their publications. He worked on their Shakespeare Illustrated, The Economy of Human Life, The Biographical Mirror, The Memoirs of Count de Grammont, Lady Diana Beauclerk's illustrations of John Dryden's Fables and other works. His style was similar to that of Francesco Bartolozzi, and Gardiner claimed some of the plates bearing Bartolozzi's name as his own work; he subsequently worked for Bartolozzi.

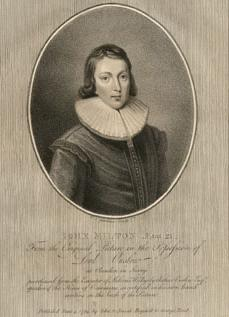
The young John Milton, 1794 engraving by Gardiner

Gardiner occasionally painted, and in 1787, 1792, and 1793 exhibited pictures at the Royal Academy. He quit his profession as an engraver, and went to Dublin.

Gardiner returned to England with the intention of entering the church, and was admitted to Emmanuel College, Cambridge in 1797. Finding that as an Irishman he had no chance there of a fellowship, he moved to Benet College, and took his degree in 1797 as sixth senior optime. He remained at Cambridge for some time in the hopes of obtaining a fellowship.

Gardiner went back to London, where he found employment in copying portraits for his former patron Edward Harding. Subsequently he set up as a bookseller and publisher in Pall Mall. From his eccentricities of dress, behaviour, and conversation, he became a well-known figure at sales, and his shop was often visited by people out of curiosity. He avowed political views as a Whig with great freedom. Thomas Frognall Dibdin introduced him in his Bibliomania under the character of "Mustapha", and an engraved portrait of him exists in that character. Gardiner resented this keenly, and retaliated with stinging sarcasm in his published catalogues. Dibdin, in his Bibliographical Decameron, refers again to this controversy.

Gardiner did not meet with success in his new profession, and became slovenly in his habits and a great snuff-taker. On 8 May 1814 he committed suicide, in consequence, as he described it, of unbearable misery. He left a brief autobiography, printed in the Gentleman's Magazine for June 1814. He married a Miss Seckerson.

== Notes ==
Attribution

This article incorporates text from a publication now in the public domain: "Gardiner, William Nelson". Dictionary of National Biography. London: Smith, Elder & Co. 1885–1900.
