= Charles Collignon (surgeon) =

British surgeon and professor of anatomy

- Born: 30 January 1725
- Died: 1 October 1785 (aged 60); Cambridge

Charles Collignon FRS (30 January 1725 – 1 October 1785) was a British surgeon and Cambridge's professor of anatomy.

== Life ==
Collignon was born in 1725 to family who had come to Britain from France. He attended Cambridge University where he became an M.D. in 1754. He is known for composing a tune called University which is traditionally used for George Herbert's hymn "The God of Love My Shepherd Is".

In 1753 Collignon became Cambridge's Professor of Anatomy. This was a role that he was peculiarly suited to: he was said to look like a skeleton because he was so thin. Another source indicates however that his body was bought from resurrectionists but his skeleton is still in Addenbrookes Hospital.

Collignon had several children but only his daughter, Catherine Collignon, lived to adulthood. She was baptised in 1754. She is known because she made what was called a literal translation of a book called An Historical and Biographical Dictionary by Abbé Ladvocat.

In 1764 Collignon published an important work that summarised his understanding of anatomy. An Enquiry Into the Structure of the Human Body, Relative to Its Supposed Influence on the Morals of Mankind ran to 67 pages and it was published by Cambridge University.

In 1766 he started his final career when he became a physician to Addenbrookes Hospital. In 1768 Collignon received a body for use in anatomy at Cambridge that turned out to be the body of the former celebrity novelist, Laurence Sterne. According to one account Collignon recognised Sterne's body and he arranged for Sterne to have a second funeral despite Sterne's body being that of a pauper. Another source indicates however that his body was bought from resurrectionists but his skeleton is still in Addenbrookes Hospital.

After he died in Cambridge in 1785, The Medical Works of Charles Collignon MD was published. Collignon's daughter Catherine made a £1000 bequest to Addenbrooke's Hospital in Cambridge where her father had worked in 1832.
