= Collingwood Monument =

Monument in Tynemouth, England

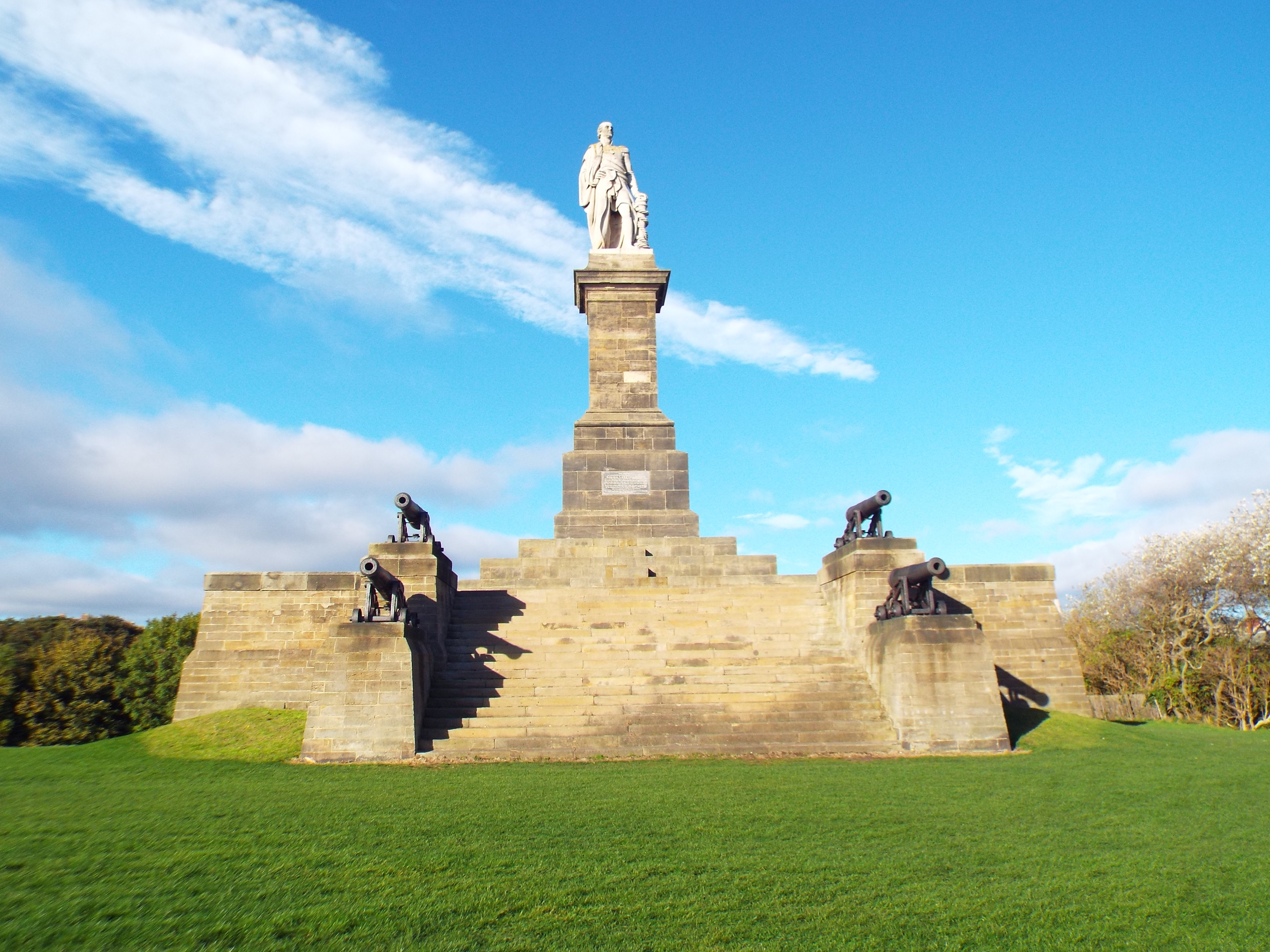
- The memorial in June 2016
- Interactive map of Collingwood Monument
- Location: Tynemouth, Tyne and Wear, England
- Coordinates: 55.0148°N 1.4201°W
- Designer: John Graham Lough and John Dobson
- Type: Statue
- Material: Marble and sandstone
- Height: 23 feet (7 m)
- Completion date: 1845
- Dedicated to: Cuthbert Collingwood, 1st Baron Collingwood

Listed Building – Grade II*
- Official name: Collingwood Monument and guns
- Designated: 19 February 1986
- Reference no.: 1355011

The Collingwood Monument is a Grade II* listed monument in Tynemouth, England, dedicated to Cuthbert Collingwood, 1st Baron Collingwood. A Royal Navy admiral noted for being second-in-command to Horatio Nelson, 1st Viscount Nelson during the Battle of Trafalgar, Collingwood is sometimes referred to as the forgotten hero of Trafalgar. The monument's base is by John Dobson and the statue is a work of the sculptor John Graham Lough. It is situated just off Front Street in Tynemouth and overlooks the mouth of the River Tyne.

== Background ==
Lord Collingwood was born in Newcastle upon Tyne, the son of a merchant. He attended the Royal Grammar School and joined the Royal Navy as a midshipman at the age of 12. From there he continued his nautical education under his cousin Captain Richard Brathwaite. After serving in the naval brigade which fought at the Battle of Bunker Hill, Collingwood was commissioned in 1775 as a lieutenant. His first command was HMS Badger, succeeding Horatio Nelson, and Collingwood's first major command was HMS Sampson. During the Battle of Trafalgar Collingwood assumed command of the British fleet after Nelson's death, transferring his flag to HMS Euryalus. Collingwood then led the fleet and completed the battle plans that he and Nelson had created together. For his role in the battle Collingwood was given the thanks of both houses of Parliament and awarded a pension of £2,000 per annum, as well as being promoted on 9 November 1805 to Vice-Admiral of the Red and raised to the peerage as Baron Collingwood, of Caldburne and Hethpool in the County of Northumberland.

In 1805 Collingwood was appointed as Commander-in-Chief, Mediterranean Fleet. After requesting to be relieved of his command the government stated that it urgently required an admiral of his calibre to lead against the dangers of the French and her allies, and that his country could therefore not dispense of him. However, in 1809, his health declined and he was granted leave. In 1810 Collingwood died of cancer on board HMS Ville de Paris as he sailed for England. He was laid to rest beside Nelson in St Paul's Cathedral. During his career he had served in the American War of Independence, French Revolutionary Wars and Napoleonic Wars, and had been awarded three Naval Gold Medals, making him one of only three people to share the distinction of earning a total of three.

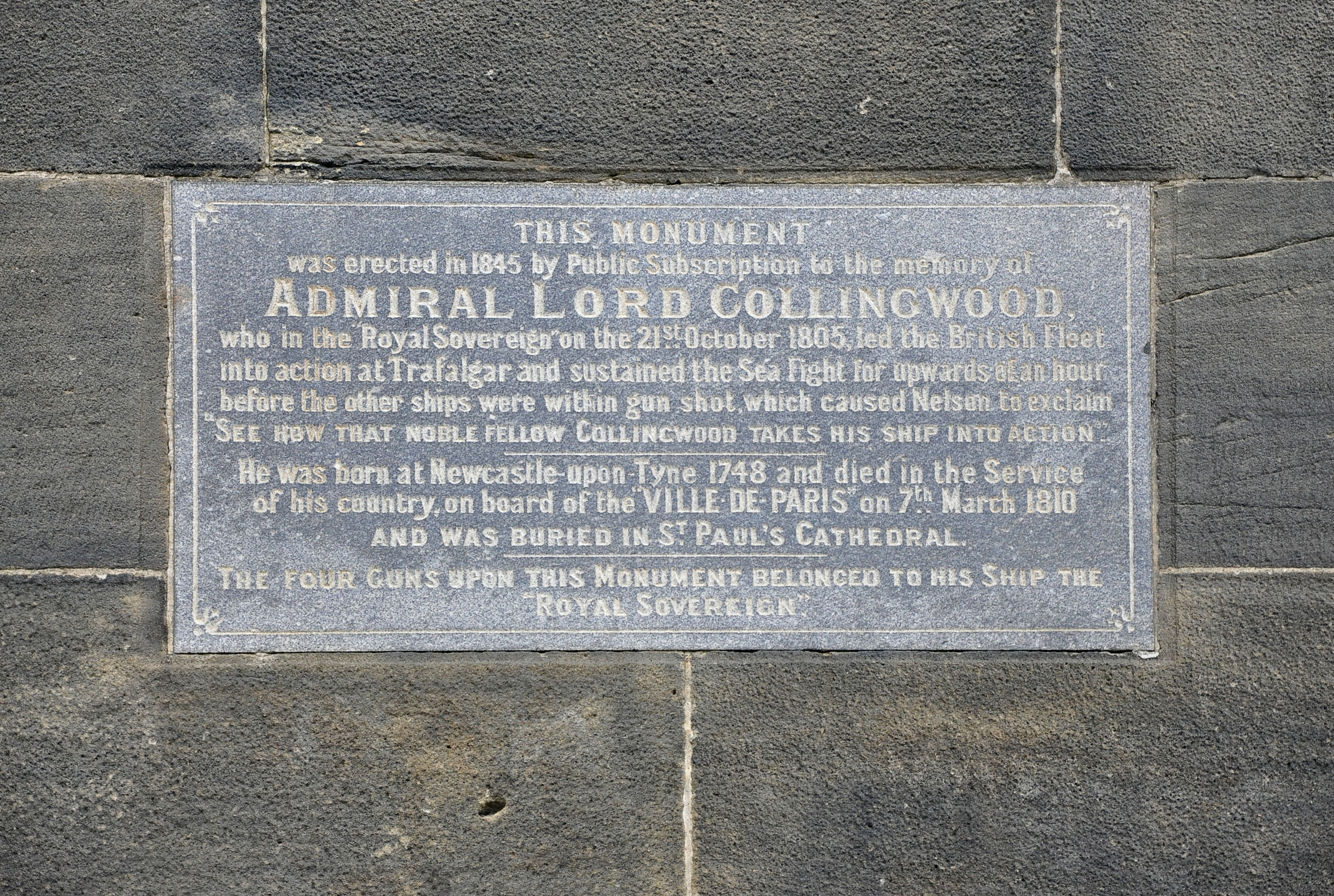
The inscription on the base of the plinth

== The monument ==
The monument was erected to commemorate Collingwood and his connection to North Shields, and was deliberately positioned so that it could be seen from the Tyne. It was paid for by public subscription. The architect was John Dobson and John Graham Lough was responsible for the sculpture. The monument features a high wide base, with slit openings and a door in the rear. A flight of steps leads to the base of the plinth and side walls flank the steps. Upon the walls are four cannon from HMS Royal Sovereign, Collingwood's flagship during the Battle of Trafalgar. The statue of Collingwood stands upon this plinth, a cloak draped over Collingwood's Royal Navy uniform. The figure's left hand rests on a bollard wrapped in rope.

The monument was completed in 1845 except for the cannons, which were added in 1849.

The inscription on the plinth reads:

THIS MONUMENT

was erected by public subscription to the memory of

ADMIRAL LORD COLLINGWOOD

who in the Royal Sovereign on the 21st October 1805 led the British fleet

into action at Trafalgar and sustained the sea fight for upwards of an hour

before the other ships were within gun shot which caused Nelson to exclaim

'SEE HOW THAT NOBLE FELLOW COLLINGWOOD TAKES HIS SHIP INTO ACTION

He was born at Newcastle upon Tyne 1748 and died in the service

of his country on board of the VILLE DE PARIS on 7 March 1810

AND WAS BURIED IN ST PAUL'S CATHEDRAL

THE FOUR GUNS UPON THIS MONUMENT BELONGED TO HIS SHIP THE

"ROYAL SOVEREIGN"

== Gallery ==
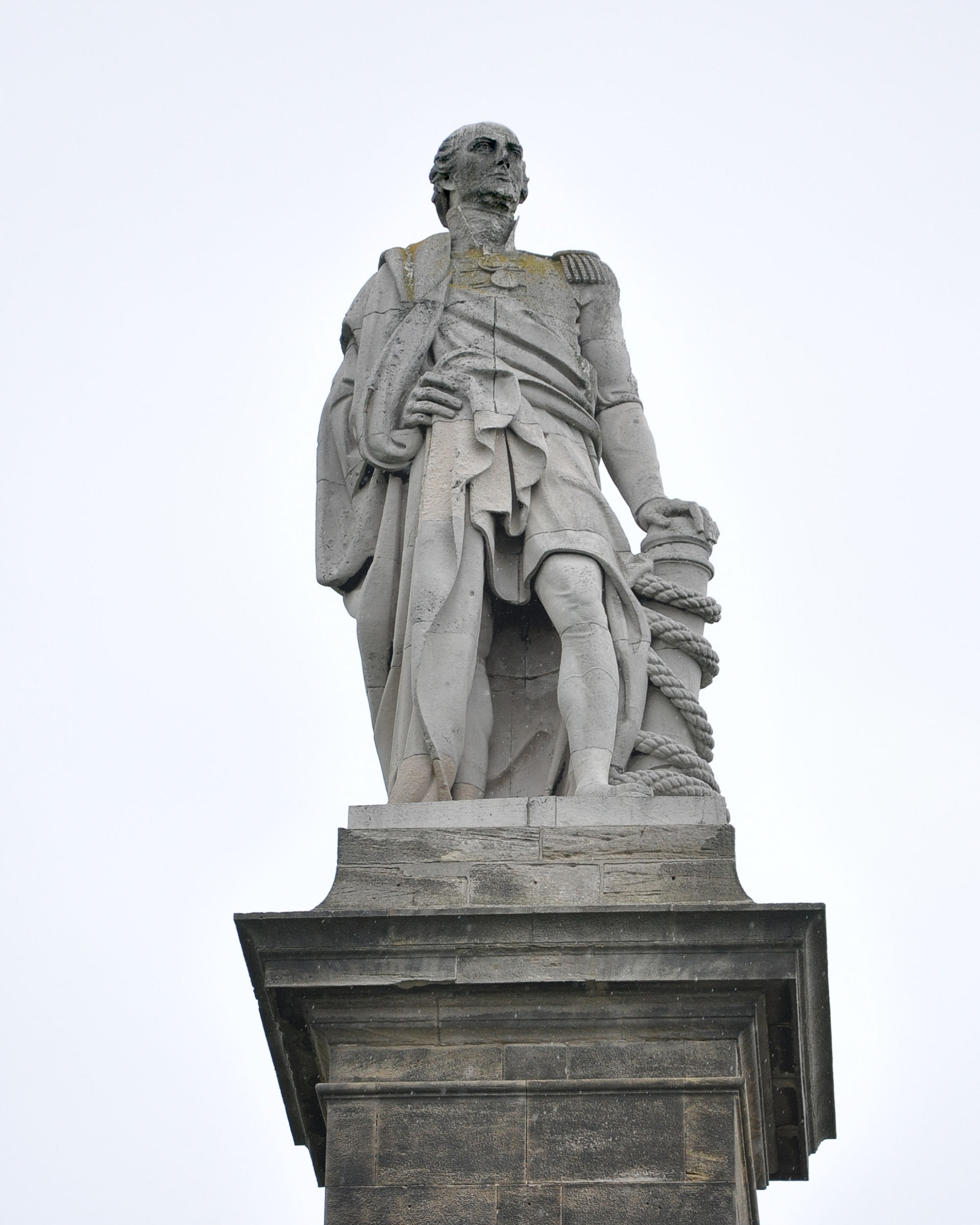

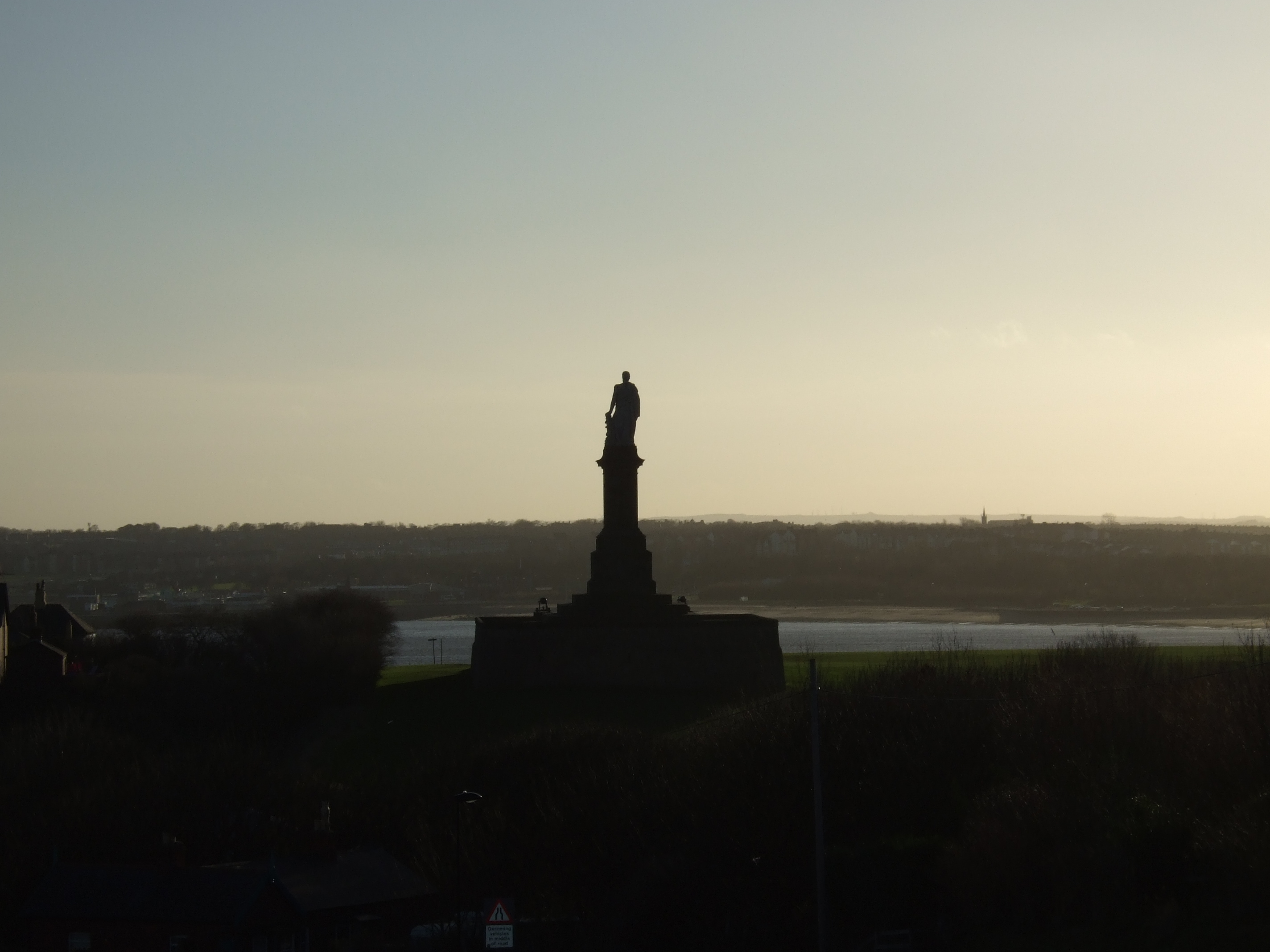

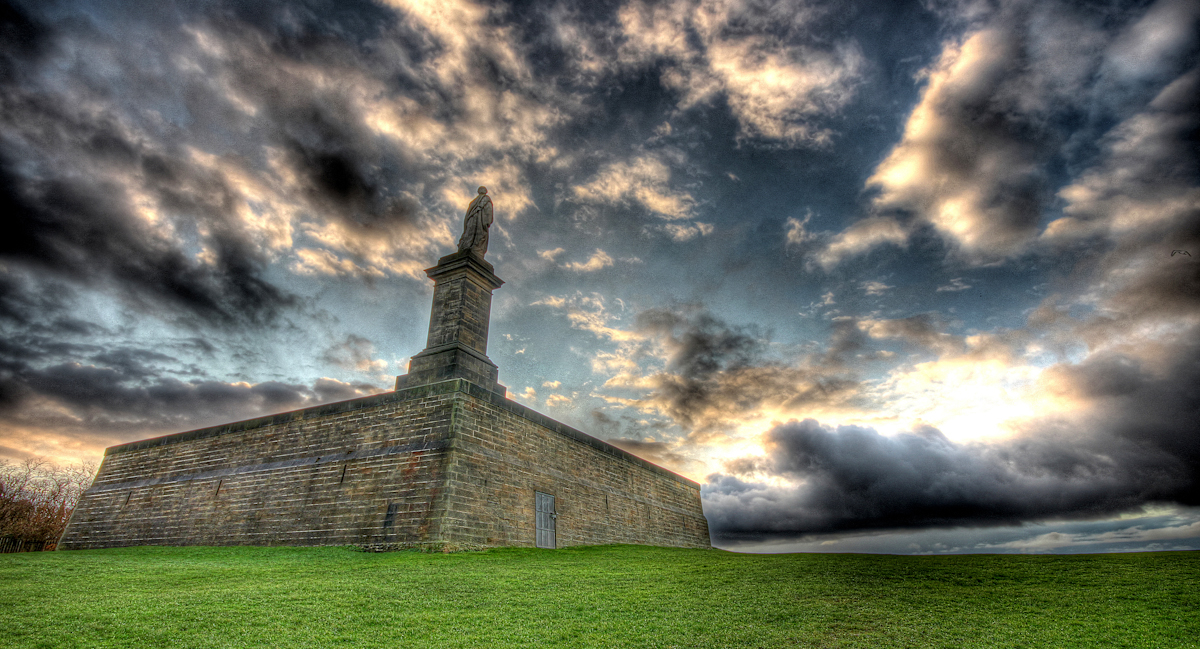

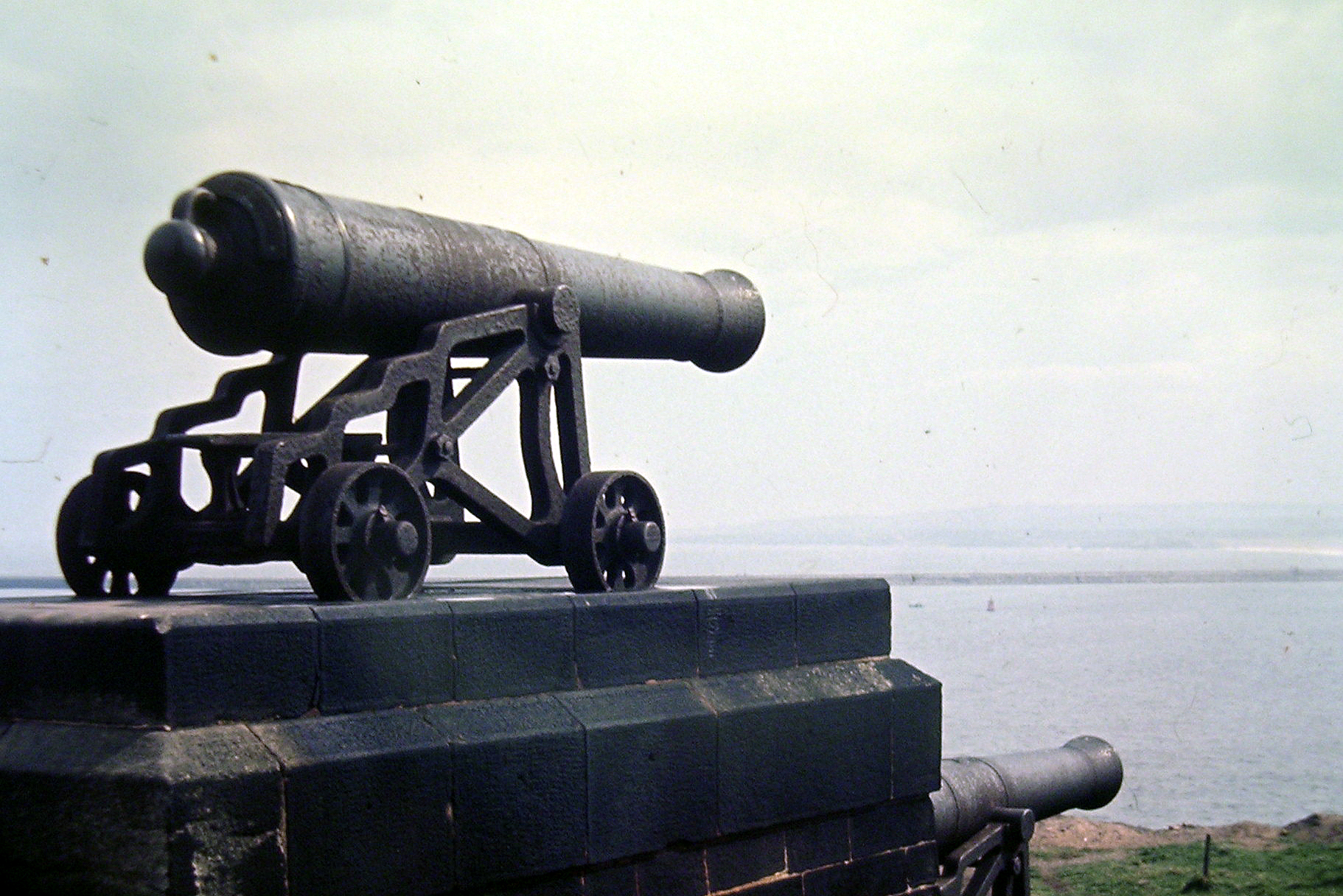

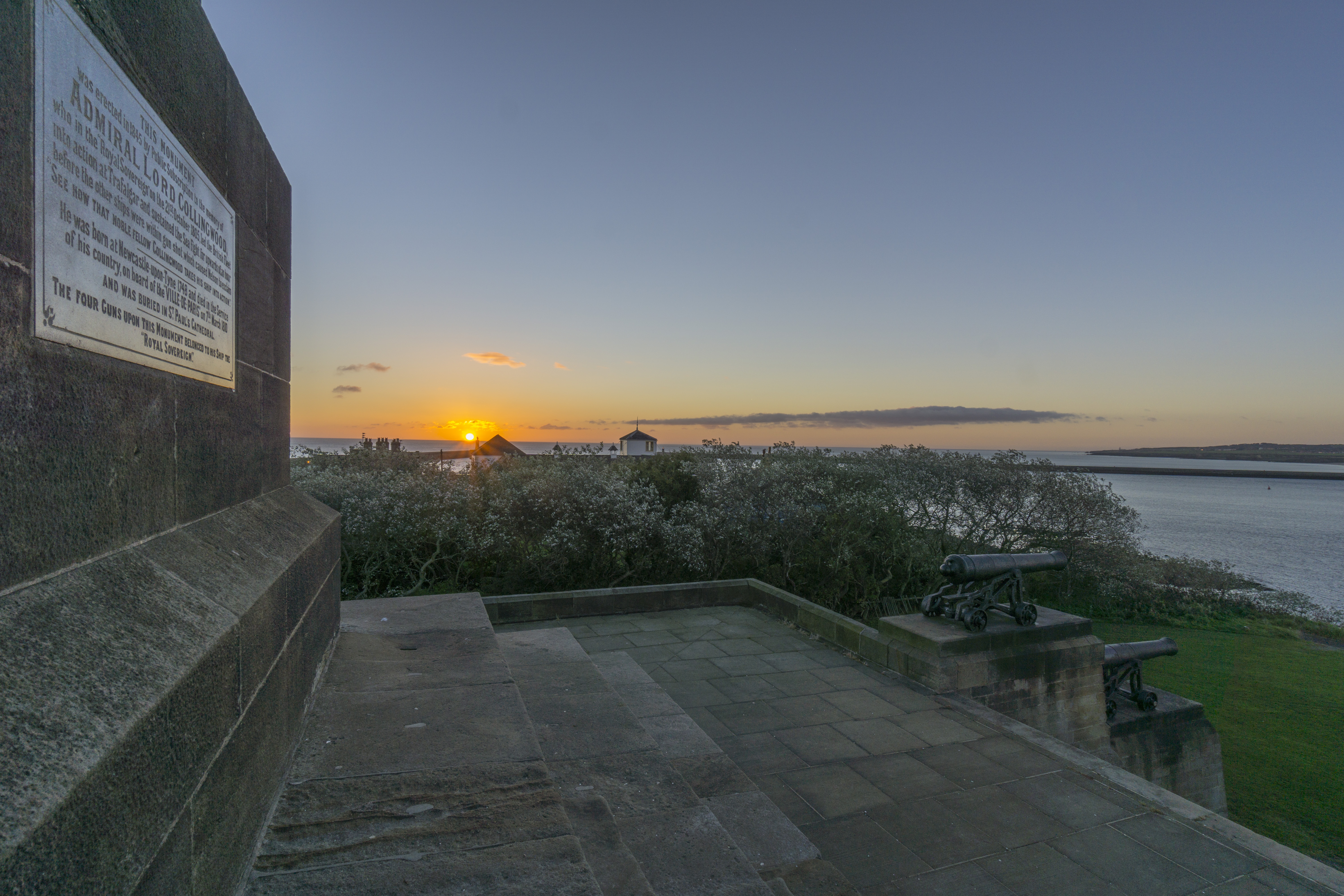

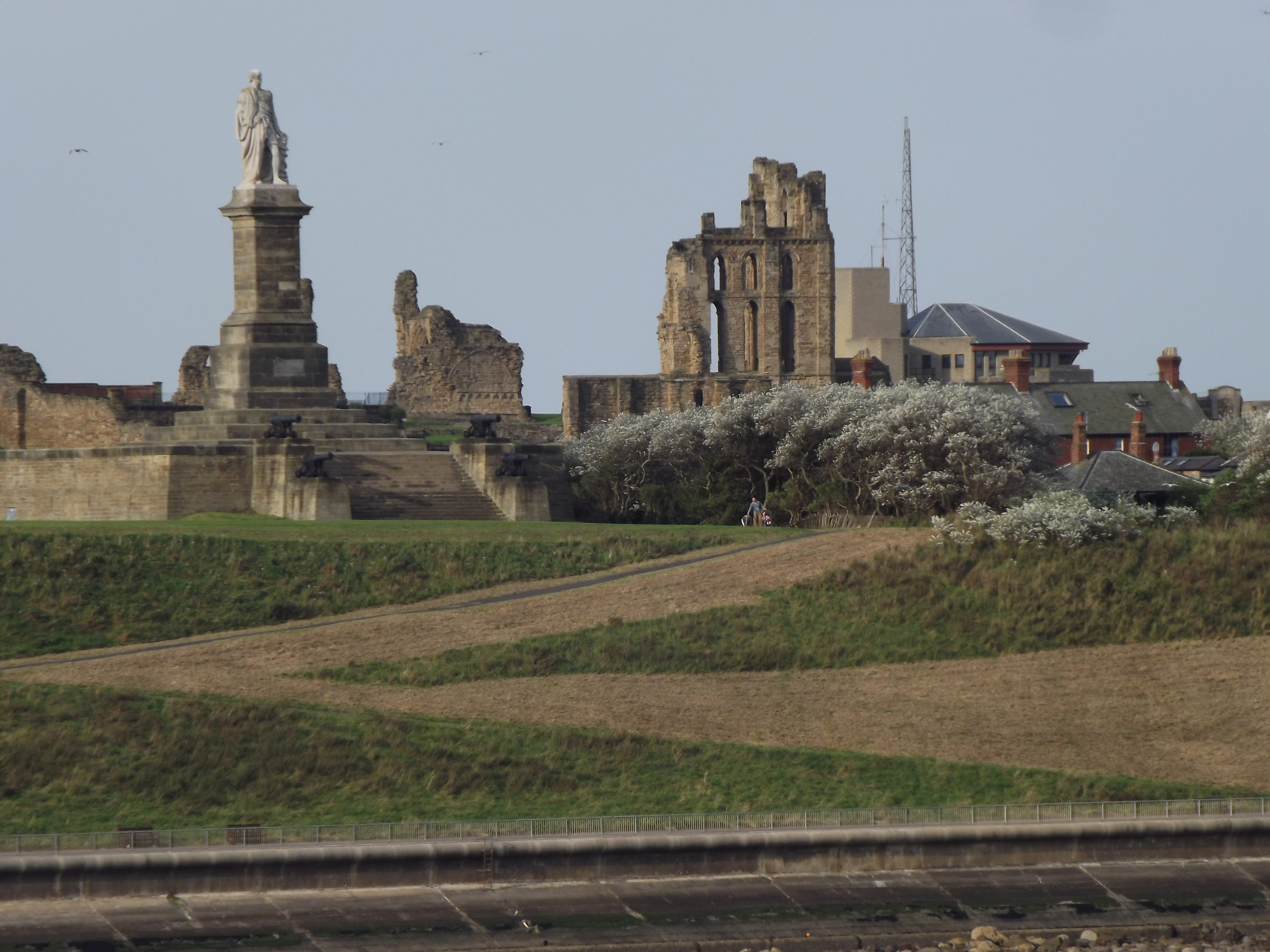

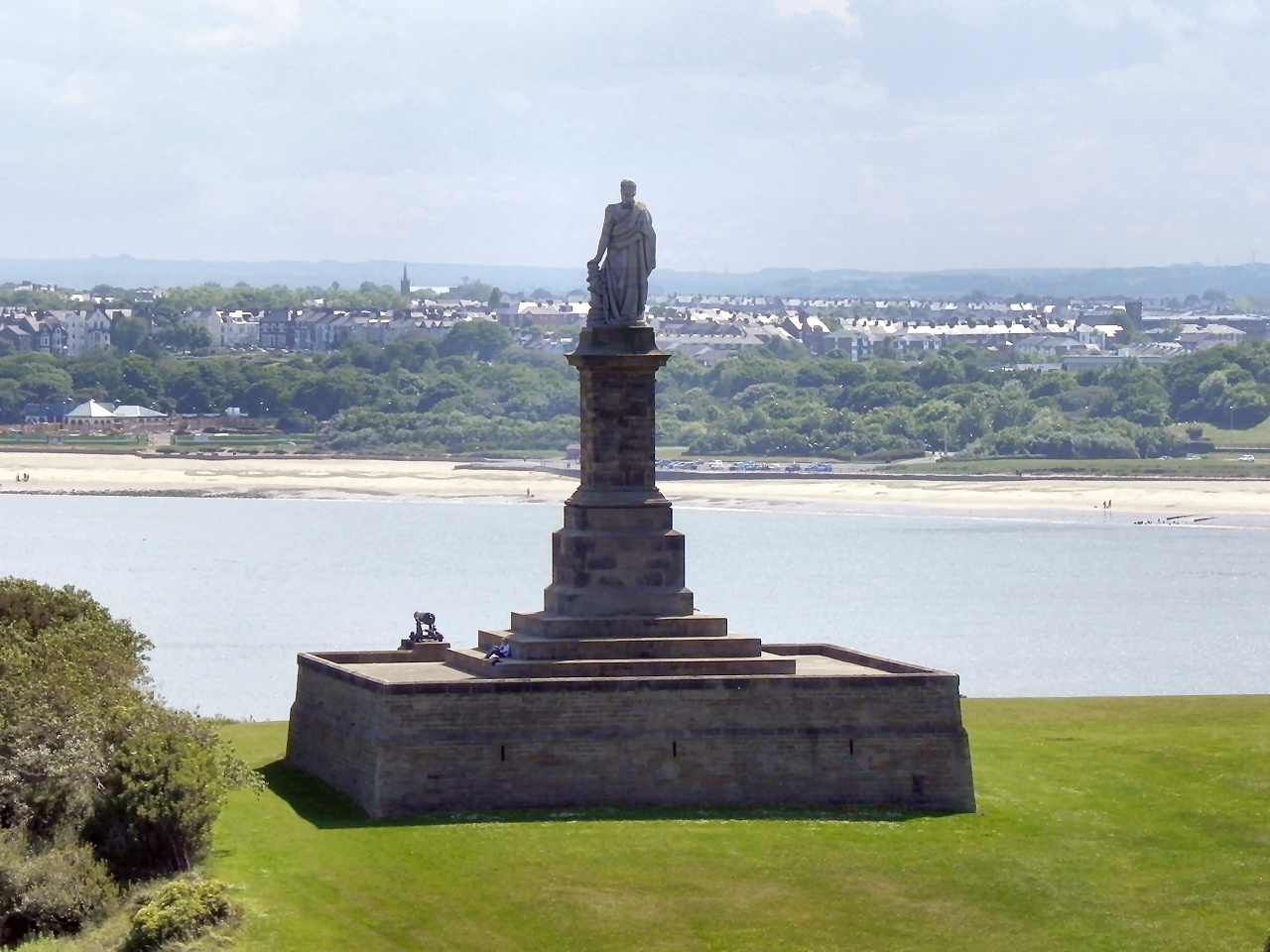

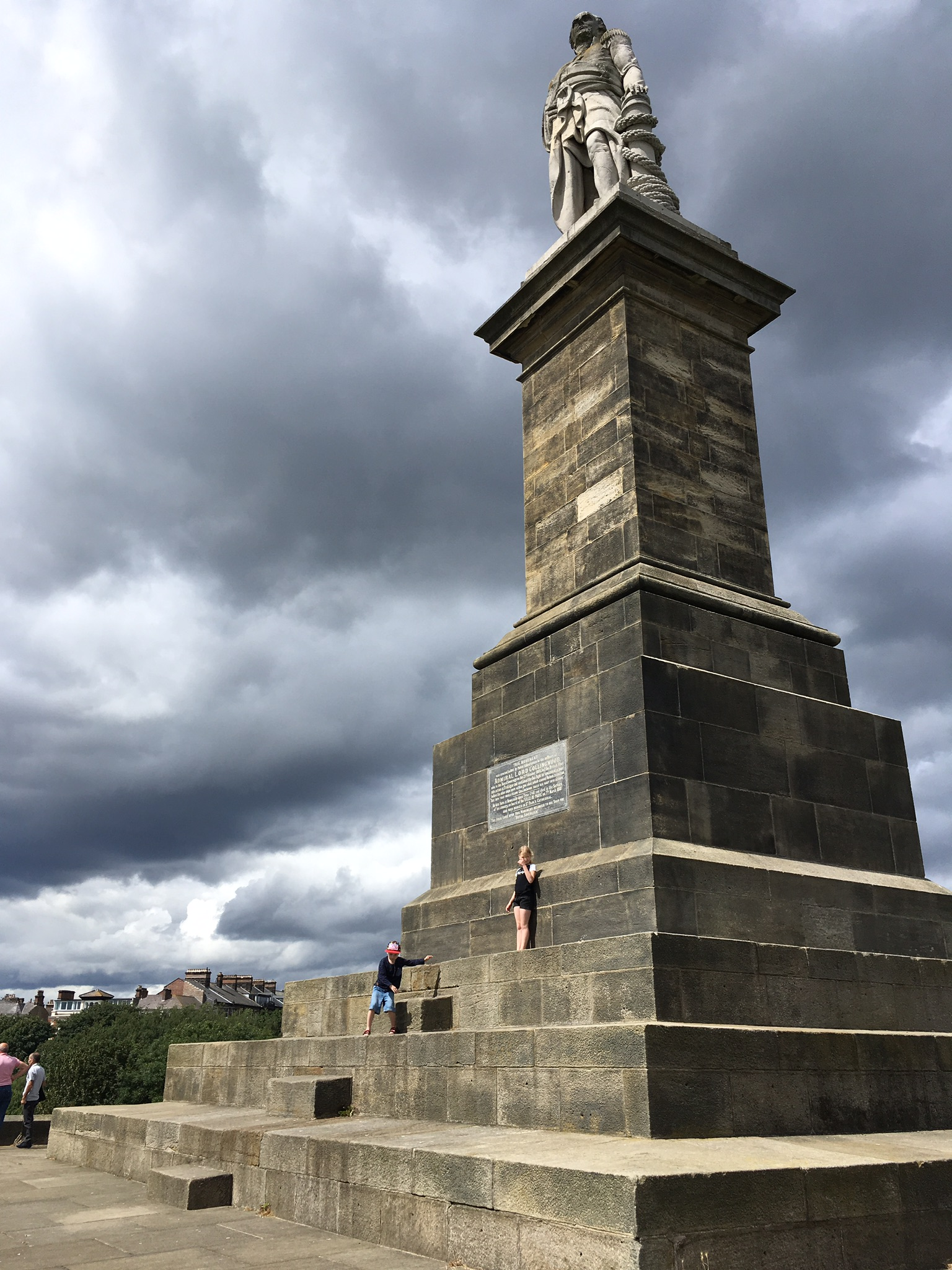

== In popular culture ==
The monument is the scene of a murder in season 11 of the TV series Vera (in the episode "Witness").

== See also ==
- Grade II* listed buildings in Tyne and Wear
