= Hinchinbrooke (ship) =

Several ships have been named Hinchinbrooke, or Hinchinbrook, or Hinchinbroke, or Hinchenbrook.

- Hinchinbrooke (1780 ship) was the Spanish ship San Carlos that Admiral Rodney's squadron captured in 1780. She was sold as a prize and in 1781 commenced a voyage as an "extra" ship of the British East India Company. During the voyage a French squadron captured her at the Battle of Porto Praya, and the British Royal Navy recaptured her within a day or so. She was lost in the Hooghly River in 1783 on her return voyage to Britain.
- Hinchinbrook (1811 ship) was a cutter of 70 tons (bm), that sailed between Weymouth and the Channel Islands until she wrecked in January 1826.
- Hinchinbroke (1812 ship) was a packet for the Post Office Packet Service, launched near Falmouth and operating out of Falmouth, Cornwall. She was wrecked on 25 July 1813 on Watling Key, Bahamas with the loss of a crew member. She was on a voyage from Jamaica to London.
- Hinchinbrooke (1814 ship), of 195 tons (bm), was built in America in 1812 and by 1814 was a Falmouth packet. On 1 May 1814 she repelled an attack by the American privateer Grand Turk in a single-ship action. She wrecked in May 1816.

== See also ==
- HMS Hinchinbrook – one of four vessels of the British Royal Navy
