= List of Weymouth–Channel Islands sailing packets =

The Channel Islands Post Offices were established in 1794. Thereafter cutters under contract to the Post Office Packet Service sailed weekly, and later twice-weekly, carrying mail between Weymouth, Dorset, and the Channel Islands. Royal Charlotte was the first to sail, on 13 February 1794. She and Rover were Dover packets on the Dover–Calais run displaced by the outbreak of the French Revolutionary Wars. Two packets were lost to the perils of the sea, and one a French privateer captured.

Hinchinbrook was the first government packet to be wrecked. The loss of Hinchinbrook, followed by the loss later that year of Francis Freeling, left the Weymouth packet service short two vessels of the three on the route. Because the Post Office was expecting to introduce steam packets within a year or so it decide to make do with temporary solutions.

The Weymouth Packet Service borrowed Iris, which had been a Milford packet but now was in reserve at Holyhead, and Dove. It also employed a third. One account named the third as Samuel and Julia. In a separate listing, the same author, named it as Queen Charlotte.

Steam service began on 7 July 1827 when Watersprite took out the first Channel mail to move by steam. Iris returned to Holyhead. Steam vessels replaced all the sailing vessels.

In 1827 the Admiralty took over the packets. The service ended in 1845.

The listing below has the packets in chronological order by time of service. The tonnages are all burthens (bm), with the first number coming from Lucking, and the second, if present, generally from Newport.

- Royal Charlotte was of 80 or 63 tons (bm). She served from February 1794 to June 1795. In June 1795, Earl of Chesterfield replaced her.
- Rover had been launched in 1789 at West Cowes. She was of 67 tons (bm). Her length was 53 ft 0 in (16.2 m), and her beam was 18 ft 2 in (5.5 m). She served from February 1794 to about July 1811. She was wrecked off Alderney in 1825.
- Earl of Chesterfield had been launched at Bridport in 1795. She was of 78 tons (bm). Her length was 56 ft 0 in (17.1 m), and her beam was 19 ft 0 in (5.8 m). She served from June 1795 to November 1806. In December she was offered for sale, but there is no evidence in the Weymouth register of a change in ownership. She was broken up in 1811.
- Chesterfield (I) was launched in 1806 at Portland. She served from November 1806 to her capture in October 1811, as a Post Office Packet Service, sailing between Weymouth and the Channel Islands. She then became a French privateer that made several captures before the Royal Navy recaptured her.
- General Doyle was launched in 1803 at Looe. Between January 1805 and September 1806 she sailed as a privateer. Between October 1806 to November 1809, she became a packet, sailing between Weymouth and the Channel Islands. From 1810 she became a merchant ship. In August 1813, she survived a maritime incident. An American privateer captured and burnt her in 1814.
- Francis Freeling was launched in 1809 at Portland. She was of 86 or 85 tons (bm). Her length was 57 ft 7 in (17.6 m), and her beam was 19 ft 4 in (5.9 m). She served from December 1809 to September 1826. She foundered circa 6 September 1826 A Swedish brig may have run her down in a gale; the packet's nine crew members and seven passengers all perished. The mails were lost.
- Rapid served from about January 1812 to about November 1812.
- Chesterfield (II) was launched in 1812 at Portland. She was of 107 tons (bm). Her length was 63 ft 4 in (19.3 m), and her beam was 20 ft 0 in (6.1 m). She served from November 1812 to January 1813. As of February 2023, her whereabouts between 1813 and 1826 are obscure. She appeared in Lloyd's Register in 1826. A report dated Messina, 14 January 1826, stated that Chesterfield, Prowse, master, had put back there in a damaged state, having suffered considerably, mostly in her upper works. It was expected that she would have to discharge and that her cargo would be transshipped on another British vessel for its original destination. She then started trading between Bristol and Africa. She apparently disappeared in 1835 on a voyage to Africa and was last listed in the 1834 volume of Lloyd's Register.
- Hinchinbrook was launched in 1811 at Bridport. She served from July 1811 to February 1826. She was wrecked on 2 February 1826 near Longy, Alderney. Her crew, passengers, and mails were saved.
- Sir William Curtis was launched in 1815 at Hastings. She was of 75 tons (bm). Her length was 58 ft 5 in (17.8 m), and her beam was 17 ft 7 in (5.4 m). She served from June 1816 to some point in 1817. She was a Ramsgate cutter that replaced Countess of Liverpool for a year, from June 1816 to June 1817.
- Countess of Liverpool was launched in 1814 at Portland (Weymouth). She served from February 1814 to July 1827. From 1828 she started sailing to Brazil, and from 1830 to India. In 1833, she became leaky while sailing in the Indian Ocean. She was condemned in 1833 and then broken up at Mauritius in 1834.
- Queen Charlotte served from about February 1826 to July 1826.
- Iris, of 69 tons (bm), served from October 1826 to June 1827.
- Dove served from November 1826 to July 1827.

Note: The Falmouth Post Office packet service also sailed vessels named Chesterfield, Francis Freeling, Hinchinbroke, and Hinchinbrooke, but these sailed across the Atlantic and to the Mediterranean, and were more than twice the size of the Weymouth packets.
