= Hinchinbrook =

Hinchinbrook is the name of several places and ships, ultimately named for Edward Montagu, 1st Earl of Sandwich, Viscount Hinchinbrooke:

== Places ==
- Hinchinbrook, New South Wales, a suburb of Sydney, Australia
- Hinchinbrook Island, an island in tropical north Queensland, Australia
- Electoral district of Hinchinbrook a state parliamentary district in North Queensland Australia
- Shire of Hinchinbrook a local government area in North Queensland, centred on Ingham, Queensland
- Hinchinbrook Island (Alaska), a barrier island protecting Prince William Sound in Alaska
- Hinchinbrook Channel, a channel adjacent to Hinchinbrook Island

== Ships ==
- HMS Hinchinbrook, one of four vessels of the British Royal Navy
- Hinchinbrooke (ship)

== See also ==
- Hinchinbrooke (disambiguation)
- Hinchingbrooke (disambiguation)
