= Hinchinbrooke =

Hinchinbrooke may refer to:

- Hinchinbrooke, Quebec, a rural community in Le Haut-Saint-Laurent Regional County Municipality, Montérégie, Quebec, Canada
- Hinchinbrook Brook (French: Rivière Hinchinbrooke), a tributary of the Châteauguay River in Montérégie, Québec, Canada
- Hinchinbrooke, a former township amalgamated in 1998 to form Central Frontenac, Ontario, Canana

== Ships ==
- Hinchinbrooke (1780 ship)
- Hinchinbrooke (1814 ship)

== See also ==
- Hinchinbrook (disambiguation)
- Hinchingbrooke (disambiguation)
