= Cuthbert Collingwood, 1st Baron Collingwood =

Royal Navy officer (1748–1810)

Vice-Admiral The Right Honourable The Lord Collingwood
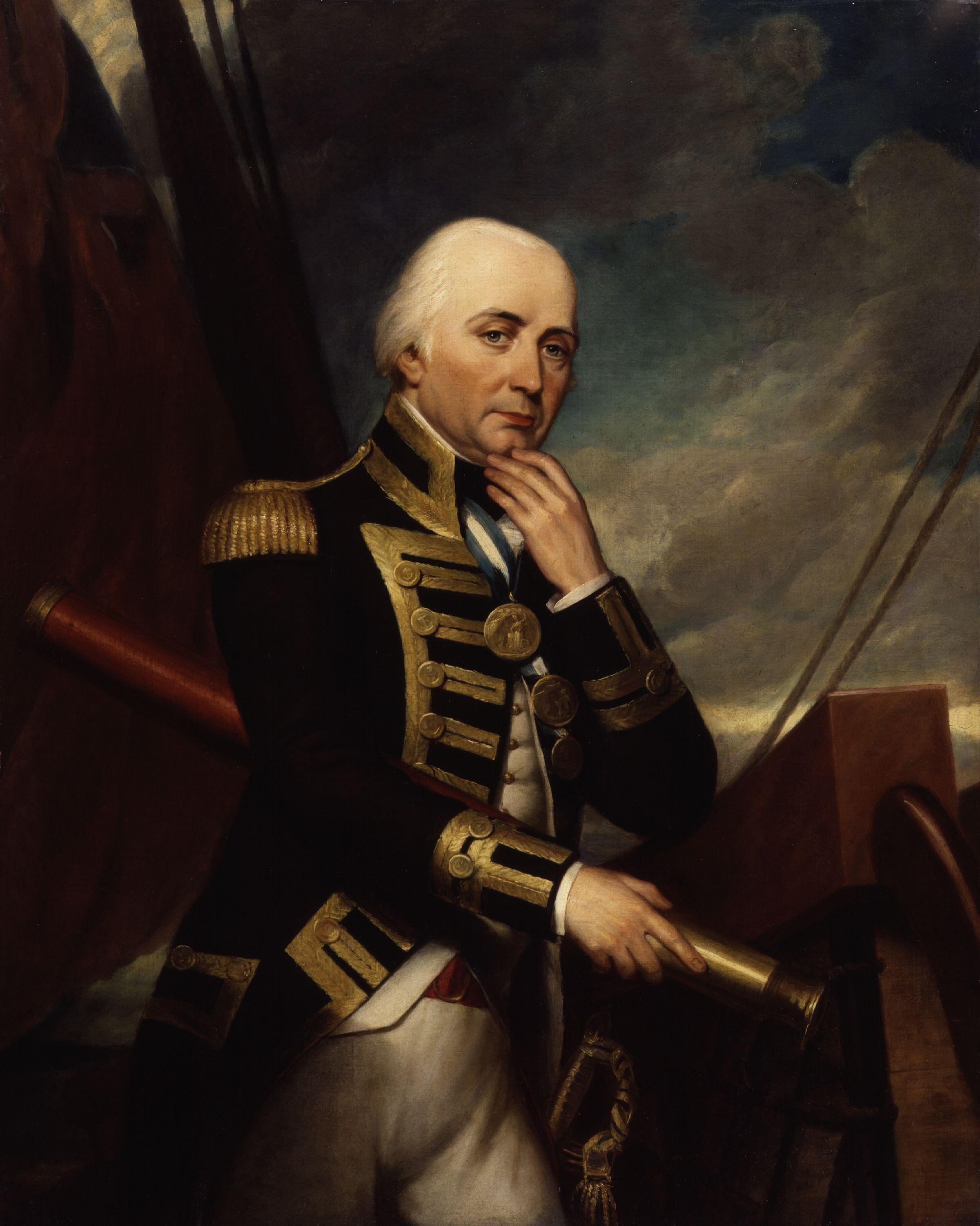
- Portrait by Henry Howard, 1828
- Born: 26 September 1748; Newcastle upon Tyne, Northumberland
- Died: 7 March 1810 (aged 61); Mediterranean Sea
- Spouse: Sarah Blackett (m. 1791)
- Children: 2
- Military career
- Allegiance: Great Britain; United Kingdom
- Branch: Royal Navy
- Service years: 1761–1810
- Rank: Vice-Admiral of the Red
- Commands: Mediterranean Fleet; HMS Triumph; HMS Barfleur; HMS Excellent; HMS Prince; HMS Mediator; HMS Sampson; HMS Pelican; HMS Hinchinbrook; HMS Badger
- Conflicts: American War of Independence; Battle of Bunker Hill; French Revolutionary Wars; Glorious First of June; Battle of Cape St. Vincent (1797); Napoleonic Wars; Battle of Trafalgar

Signature
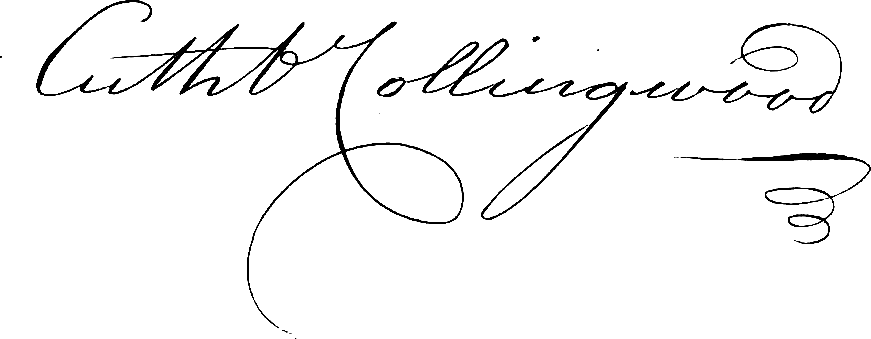

Vice-Admiral of the Red Cuthbert Collingwood, 1st Baron Collingwood (26 September 1748 – 7 March 1810) was a Royal Navy officer who served in the American War of Independence and French Revolutionary and Napoleonic Wars. Born in Newcastle upon Tyne, he joined the British navy at a young age and was promoted to lieutenant during the American War of Independence, where he led a naval brigade at the Battle of Bunker Hill. In the 1780s and 1790s Collingwood participated in the French Revolutionary Wars, during which time he captained several ships and reached the rank of post-captain. He took part in several key naval battles of the time, including the Glorious First of June and the Battle of Cape St. Vincent.

In 1799, he was promoted to rear-admiral and later vice-admiral, where he undertook a variety of command roles during the Napoleonic Wars, including serving as second in command of the British Fleet under Nelson at the Battle of Trafalgar. Following Nelson's death, Collingwood became commander-in-chief of the Mediterranean Fleet. He remained in post despite worsening health for several years and after finally being allowed to resign, he would die a day later at sea on the journey back to England. Collingwood was a respected admiral during the days of sail and notable as a friend and partner with Vice-Admiral Lord Horatio Nelson in several of the British victories of the Napoleonic Wars as well as Nelson's successor in several Royal Navy commands.

== Early life ==
Sources vary as to the exact date but Collingwood was born on either 24 or 26 September 1748 in Newcastle upon Tyne in a house (since demolished) on a street of medieval origin named 'the Side'. He had 10 siblings, although only 6 survived into adulthood, including his two brothers Wilfred and John (Wilfred would also serve as a naval officer). The Collingwood family were an old small landowning family from the border region between England and Scotland. Collingwood's great-grandfather was executed by hanging in Liverpool for supporting the House of Stuart in battle during the Jacobite rising of 1715. His grandfather and father were therefore deprived of their estate in Eslington Park, Northumberland. His father, also Cuthbert, had instead become a local merchant and small business owner (though he would later be declared bankrupt) and his mother, Milcah came from near Appleby-in-Westmorland.

At age 11, he began studying at the Royal Grammar School, Newcastle, receiving instruction in Latin. The school was well known for flogging as a form of discipline, even for younger students, and this punishment led to Collingwood's dislike of the practice and was why he used flogging sparingly on his ships later when he was a captain. However, Collingwood did not stay at school long and expressed an interest to go to sea so that at the age of 12, he went to sea as a volunteer and apprentice on board the sixth-rate HMS Shannon under the command of his cousin Captain Richard Braithwaite (or Brathwaite), who took charge of his nautical education. He received instruction in sailing, mathematics (including trigonometry), navigation (including celestial navigation) and in how to use a sextant. Collingwood would spend several years of apprentice service under Braithwaite, including when Braithwaite changed ship to the sixth-rate HMS Gibraltar and saw sea service in home waters, the Atlantic Ocean and the Mediterranean Sea.

In 1766, in his 18th year, Collingwood was officially rated as midshipman. In 1767, he was transferred to the sixth-rate HMS Liverpool assigned to the Mediterranean fleet. He served on the ship for several years, becoming master's mate (a position responsible for navigation) while preparing for his lieutenancy examinations. In 1772, Collingwood spent a short period attached to the third-rate HMS Lenox, a guardship at Portsmouth commanded by Captain Robert Roddam. In 1773, he was sent to Sheerness in Kent with a party of 18 seaman and joined the fourth-rate HMS Portland. The ship joined a convoy of merchant ships and headed for the Americas via Madeira. The ship patrolled waters around the Leeward Islands, the Windward Islands and Jamaica. On 1 June 1773, Collingwood was discharged from Portland and sent to serve on the third-rate HMS Princess Amelia. The Amelia sailed to Florida and then Newfoundland before returning to England in August 1773.

With the discontent forming in the Americas that would result in the ensuing American War of Independence, Collingwood sailed to Boston in 1774 with Admiral Samuel Graves on board the fourth-rate HMS Preston. He would remain on the ship as it was stationed in Boston Harbour for some 18 months on station. However, as American troops encircled the town, Collingwood fought in the British naval brigade ashore at the Battle of Bunker Hill on 17 June 1775. Collingwood was in command of the boats that landed the second wave of troops of William Howe, 5th Viscount Howe. Following the battle, he was commissioned as acting lieutenant. To have his promotion confirmed by the Admiralty, Collingwood required to return to England and so transferred to the third-rate HMS Somerset as fourth lieutenant, as the ship sailed to Nova Scotia before proceeding onto England in February 1776. He stayed in London during this time and his rank of lieutenant was officially confirmed in April 1776.

In April 1776, he joined the 14-gun HMS Hornet as first lieutenant, where he was required to form a press-gang before the ship sailed to the West Indies. Collingwood remained onboard as the ship arrived in Jamaica with a remit to protect shipping against American privateers and prevent smuggling. Collingwood believed that the ship's captain Commander Haswell was a "rotten officer" who lacked the courage to engage enemy shipping and they disagreed onboard, leading to Haswell following up with court-martial proceedings for "disobedience and neglect of orders" against Collingwood in September 1777. However, the court martial at Port Royal, Jamaica acquitted Collingwood of the charges. Shortly after his court-martial in 1777, Collingwood met Nelson when they both served on the frigate HMS Lowestoffe. The two officers would become good friends. After Nelson had left the Lowestoffe, Collingwood was given the post of second lieutenant on HMS Bristol on station in the West Indies.

== Minor command ==
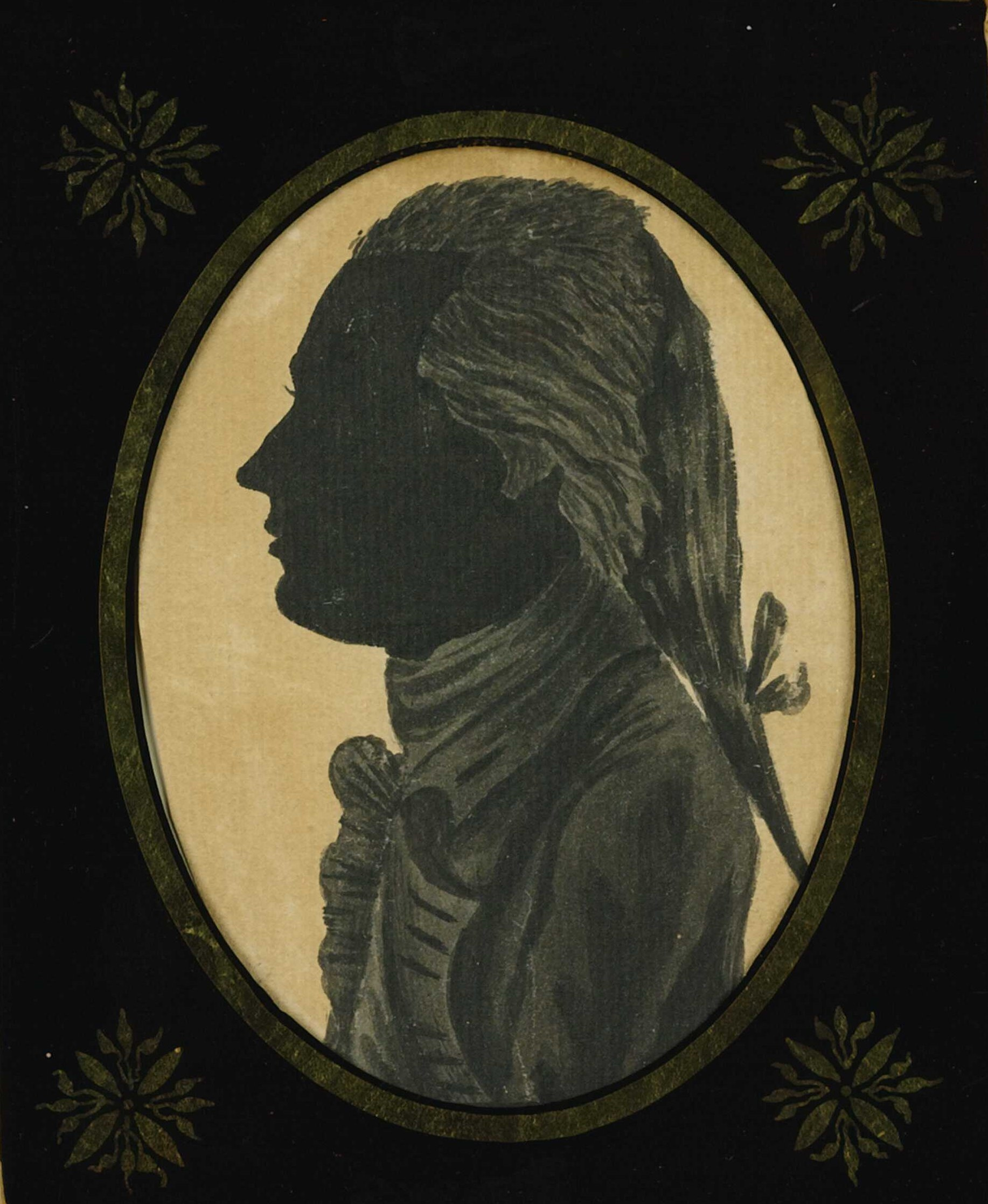
Silhouette of Collingwood drawn by Horatio Nelson when both were serving in the West Indies

On 20 June 1779, Collingwood succeeded Nelson as commander of the brig HMS Badger, his first full command. On 22 March 1780 he again succeeded Nelson, this time as post-captain of the sixth-rate HMS Hinchinbrook, a small frigate. Nelson had been the leader of a failed expedition to cross Central America from the Atlantic Ocean to the Pacific Ocean by navigating boats along the San Juan River, Lake Nicaragua and Lake Leon. Nelson was debilitated by disease and had to recover before being promoted to a larger vessel, and Collingwood succeeded him in command of Hinchinbrook and brought the remainder of the expedition back to Jamaica. By 1781, he had been appointed to command the sixth-rate HMS Pelican. On 22 July 1781, under Collingwood, Pelican captured the French 16-gun ship Le Cerf on 22 July. While navigating off Morant Cays, Jamaica, the ship was destroyed by a hurricane and the crew shipwrecked. Collingwood led his crew ashore in rafts (made from broken rigging and planks) where they remained for ten days until rescued. The subsequent court-martial, mandatory for any captain who loses his ship, declared him not at fault for the loss of the ship, given the tremendous extent of the hurricane that had caused much damage across the region. Collingwood remained without ship on half-pay in the West Indies before returning to England in early 1782. After a brief time in London, Collingwood was appointed to command to the third-rate HMS Sampson.

By 1783, Collingwood had been transferred to command the fourth-rate HMS Mediator which sailed in September 1783 to take up post in the West Indies. The ship was stationed at English Bay and then in Barbados. Collingwood renewed his friendship with Nelson while in the region. In 1784 he and Nelson were together ashore in Antigua for several weeks where they both became attracted to the unobtainable American-born Mary Moutray, who was married to the royal commissioner of the island. During frequent evenings together with Mary, Collingwood and Nelson both sketched each other and Collingwood kept the sketch. Collingwood remained in the West Indies until the end of 1786, again, together with Nelson as well as his newly promoted brother Wilfried with their mission being to prevent American ships from trading with the West Indies under the Navigation Acts. During this time, Collingwood and Nelson in their ships seized several US merchantman as prizes in consequence of trading illegally.

In July 1786, Collingwood returned to England where his ship's company were paid off. Collingwood was given an extended leave and as a relatively junior post-captain in a time of increased levels of peace, he was not given a ship for several years. Despite frequent attempts to secure a ship in London, Collingwood returned north to Newcastle for months at a time to spend time with his extended family, during which he learned that his brother, Captain Wilfried Collingwood had died at sea. As a result of the developing Nootka Crisis by June 1790, Collingwood was given command of the fifth-rate HMS Mermaid. The frigate sailed again to the West Indies under Admiral Samuel Cornish. Shortly before the ship sailed, Collingwood began correspondence with Sarah Blackett, daughter of his acquaintance John Erasmus Blackett, merchant and mayor of Newcastle whom he met through his friend and superior Admiral Robert Roddam. In 1791, the results of war having lessened, Collingwood returned to England on the Mermaid arriving at Portsmouth in April 1791. Collingwood was put on half-pay ashore and remained without command again until 1793. However, once Collingwood had been paid off, he returned to Newcastle where on 18 June 1791, at Newcastle Cathedral he married Sarah, the Cathedral being some 50 yards from where he was born. Her dowry was £6250 and in 1792, the Collingwoods used it to rent a house on Oldgate Street in Morpeth. In May 1792, they had a daughter, Sarah. His second daughter, Mary, would be born in August 1793, after he had returned to sea.

== Major command ==
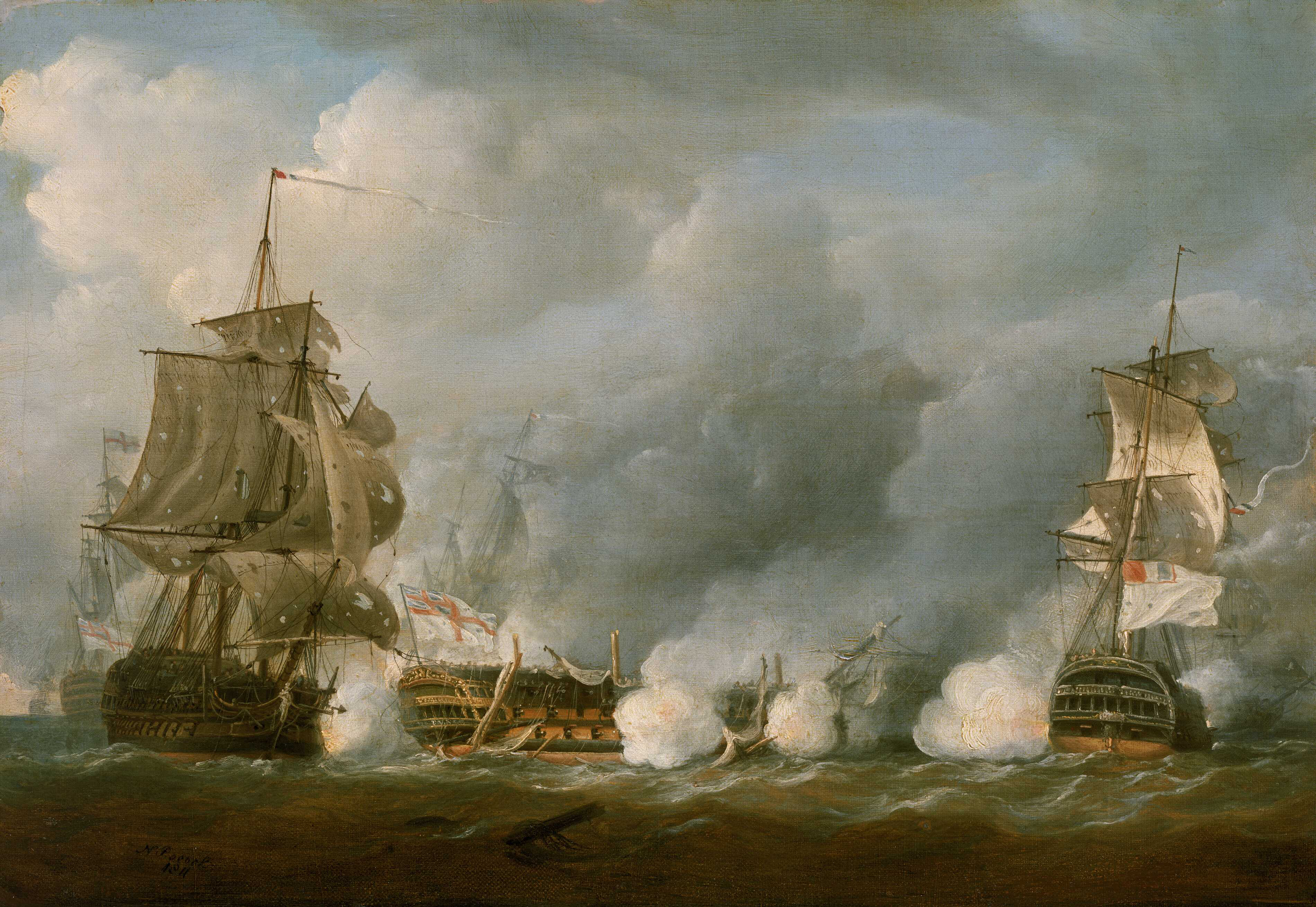
Collingwood took part in the battle known as the Glorious First of June.

Following the beginning of the French Revolutionary Wars, in 1793, he was appointed captain of the second-rate HMS Prince, the flagship of Rear-Admiral George Bowyer in the Channel Fleet. Collingwood joined the ship in Plymouth, where it was fitted out and crewed (with manning being difficult) before heading to station at Spithead. After some time on station in the Prince, Collingwood and Bowyer determined that the ship had poor sailing qualities so transferred to the second-rate HMS Barfleur. The Barfleur sailed with the rest of the fleet under overall command of Admiral Richard Howe in an effort to engage a large portion of the French Fleet and prevent a merchant convoy reaching France. This resulted in the battle of June 1794 that became known as the Glorious First of June. The Barfleur came under fire during the battle, during which time Bowyer lost his leg in action although Collingwood was not injured. Because he was not mentioned specifically in Howe's report to the Admiralty, whether by error or intention, Collingwood was disappointed not to receive a Naval Gold Medal for the action unlike the other captains present. He would later receive the medal some years later with an apology. However, on returning to England he was one of a select group of captains who were invited to dine with King George III.

In late 1794, he was given command of the third-rate HMS Hector. Collingwood was onboard for the fitting out but delays in obtaining sufficient crew resulted in his ship being kept in port. He returned home briefly to see his family but after only a few days was recalled to Plymouth to command the third-rate HMS Excellent, a ship which he would command for the next four years. After leaving England, the ship sailed for the Mediterranean Sea, protecting a merchant convoy to Corsica before joining British forces in blockade off Italy at Livorno (Leghorn), where Collingwood would again meet and serve with his friend Nelson. Collingwood and his ship would winter off Corsica until March 1796, during which time the ship had a minor collision in the darkness with the second-rate HMS Princess Royal. Collingwood served on Excellent in the fleet of Admiral John Jervis, stationed off Saint Florent. As the Spanish joined the French in war, the fleet sailed west to Gibraltar at the end of 1796. The fleet took up station off Lisbon in January 1797 with the aim being to bring the French and Spanish fleets to battle.

=== Battle of Cape St. Vincent ===
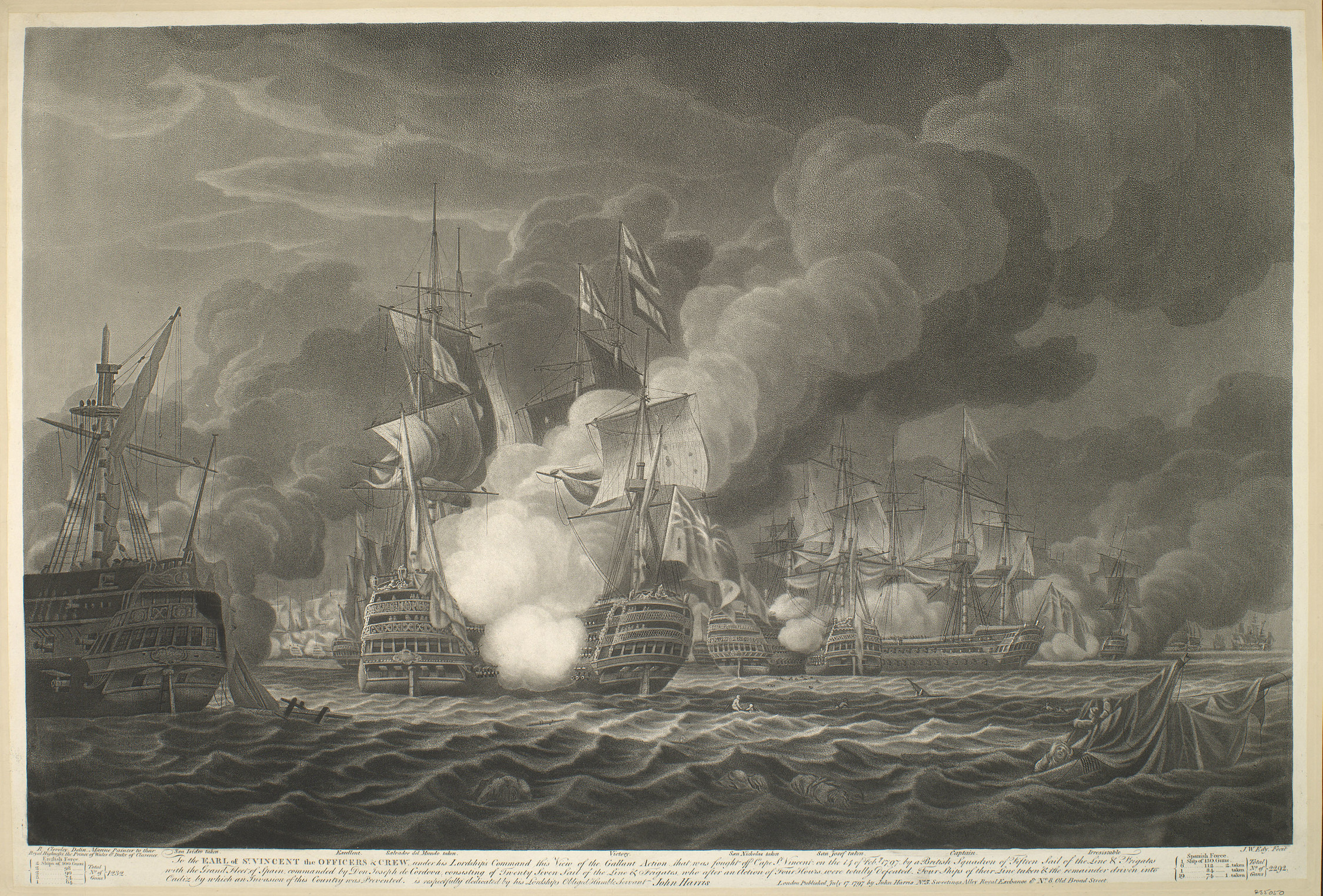
HMS Excellent with other ships during the battle at Cape St. Vincent, 1797. Collingwood would serve four years in command of the ship.

In February 1797, on board Excellent he participated in the victory of the Battle of Cape St. Vincent. As the British fleet began to pass in parallel to the Spanish fleet, Jervis ordered his ships to tack in succession and engage. Nelson saw an opportunity to engage the Spanish fleet directly and left the line of the fleet, heading straight for the Spanish van. Collingwood, who was at the rear of the line, saw Nelson's action and ordered his ship to follow and engage directly. Jervis later approved of their actions following victory.

Collingwood and his ship directly engaged the far larger 112-gun Salvador del Mundo and after several rapid and accurate broadsides against the Spanish ship, the Salvador del Mundo struck her colours (though she would later attempt to fight again before being finally captured). The two ships had been "so close that a man might jump from one to another". Collingwood's ship then sailed on, engaging the 74-gun San Ysidore and causing her to surrender also. His ship then moved to support Nelson whose ship was being engaged by two Spanish ships at once. Together both Spanish ships were also defeated. During the engagement, a double-headed shot narrowly missed Collingwood's head, hitting the base of the mast near where he stood. He took it home as a souvenir for his father-in-law.

Collingwood's actions established his good reputation in the fleet for his conduct and gallantry during the battle. He received a Gold Medal for his conduct as well as the one owed to him for the Glorious First of June. He had originally declined the medal as he argued to receive such a distinction now would be to acknowledge the propriety of the injustice of not receiving the earlier medal. Lord Spencer, the First Lord of the Admiralty who wrote "the former medal would have been transmitted to you some months ago if a proper and safe conveyance had been found for it". Nelson's and Collingwood's decision to leave the line of battle and engage the Spanish directly were seen as decisive to the British victory.

=== Promotion to rear-admiral ===
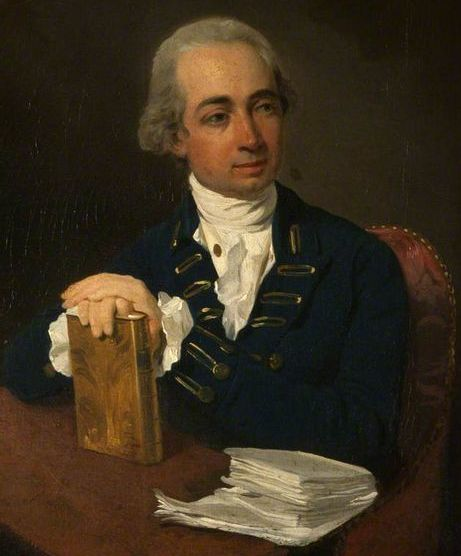
Collingwood shown in later life in a painting in Paxton House

After the battle, Collingwood and his ship would take up station blockading Cádiz and he was promoted to the rank of commodore. He is said to have written that the time on blockade was dreary. In late 1798, he returned to Portsmouth with his ship to repair. By February 1799, he had returned home to Morpeth to spend time with his family. While at home, he learned that he was to be raised to the rank of rear-admiral of the white (14 February 1799). In June 1799, Collingwood returned to sea, hoisting his flag in the third-rate HMS Triumph, joined the Channel Fleet and sailed to the Mediterranean where the principal naval forces of France and Spain were assembled. Several ships were captured and Collingwood's share of the prize money amounted to some £4,000.

In 1800, he transferred his flag from Triumph to the second-rate HMS Barfleur, which he had sailed on a few years earlier as captain. Collingwood remained active over the next several years on blockade duties until the 1802 Treaty of Amiens allowed him to return home. However, he was able to briefly spend time with his family in Plymouth who had travelled to join him where the Barfleur repaired and took supplies. At this time, he also purchased the freehold of the house, later known as Collingwood House that they had rented in Morpeth and had purchased a pet dog, Bounce, who joined him on his ship. When not at sea he resided at in the town of Morpeth which lies some 15 miles north of Newcastle upon Tyne and Chirton Hall in Chirton, now a western suburb of North Shields. Of his time in Morpeth, he is known to have remarked, "whenever I think how I am to be happy again, my thoughts carry me back to Morpeth." He was elevated to rear-admiral of the red on 1 January 1801. He remained on service until May 1802 when hostilities officially ceased and he was allowed to sign off his ship and return home for leave.

With the resumption of hostilities with France in May 1803 he left home to the Admiralty and then a ship, never to return home again. Nearly two years were spent off Brest in anticipation for Napoleon's planned invasion of the United Kingdom. Together, with his pet dog Bounce, Collingwood joined the fifth-rate HMS Diamond and raised his flag. In August 1803, Collingwood was able to transfer his flag to larger third-rate HMS Venerable. which then joined other ships and blockaded the French fleet off Brest in late 1803. The Venerable returned to Plymouth for repairs and to take food and supplies over Christmas.

=== Promotion to vice-admiral ===
After discovering that great repairs were needed to the Venerable, in February 1804, he transferred his flag to the third-rate HMS Culloden resuming blockade with the fleet off France. He briefly moved his flag to the second-rate HMS Prince but returned after only a few months to the Culloden again. On 23 April 1804, Collingwood was promoted to vice-admiral of the blue. In August 1804, he transferred to the relatively new second-rate HMS Dreadnought which would be his ship until shortly before the Battle of Trafalgar. The ship spent time on blockade in 1804 before supplying and repairing at Cawsand Bay, Cornwall until March 1805.

When the French fleet sailed from Toulon, Admiral Collingwood was appointed to command a squadron with orders to pursue them. The combined fleets of France and Spain, after sailing to the West Indies, returned to Cádiz. On their way they encountered Collingwood's small squadron off Cádiz in August 1805. He had only three ships with him; but he succeeded in avoiding them despite being chased by 16 ships of the line. Before half of the Franco-Spanish force had entered the harbour he resumed the blockade off Cádiz by shortening sail and standing towards the combined fleet for battle. Using false signals to disguise the small size of his squadron, the combined fleet believed Collingwood's force part of a much larger fleet and did not engage, returning to harbour. His action was seen as a tactical victory that would be one of several factors that led to the events of the Battle of Trafalgar. He was soon joined by several other ships, increasing the blockade and then by Nelson who took command of the squadron on 28 September, hoping to lure the combined fleet out into a major engagement.

== Battle of Trafalgar ==
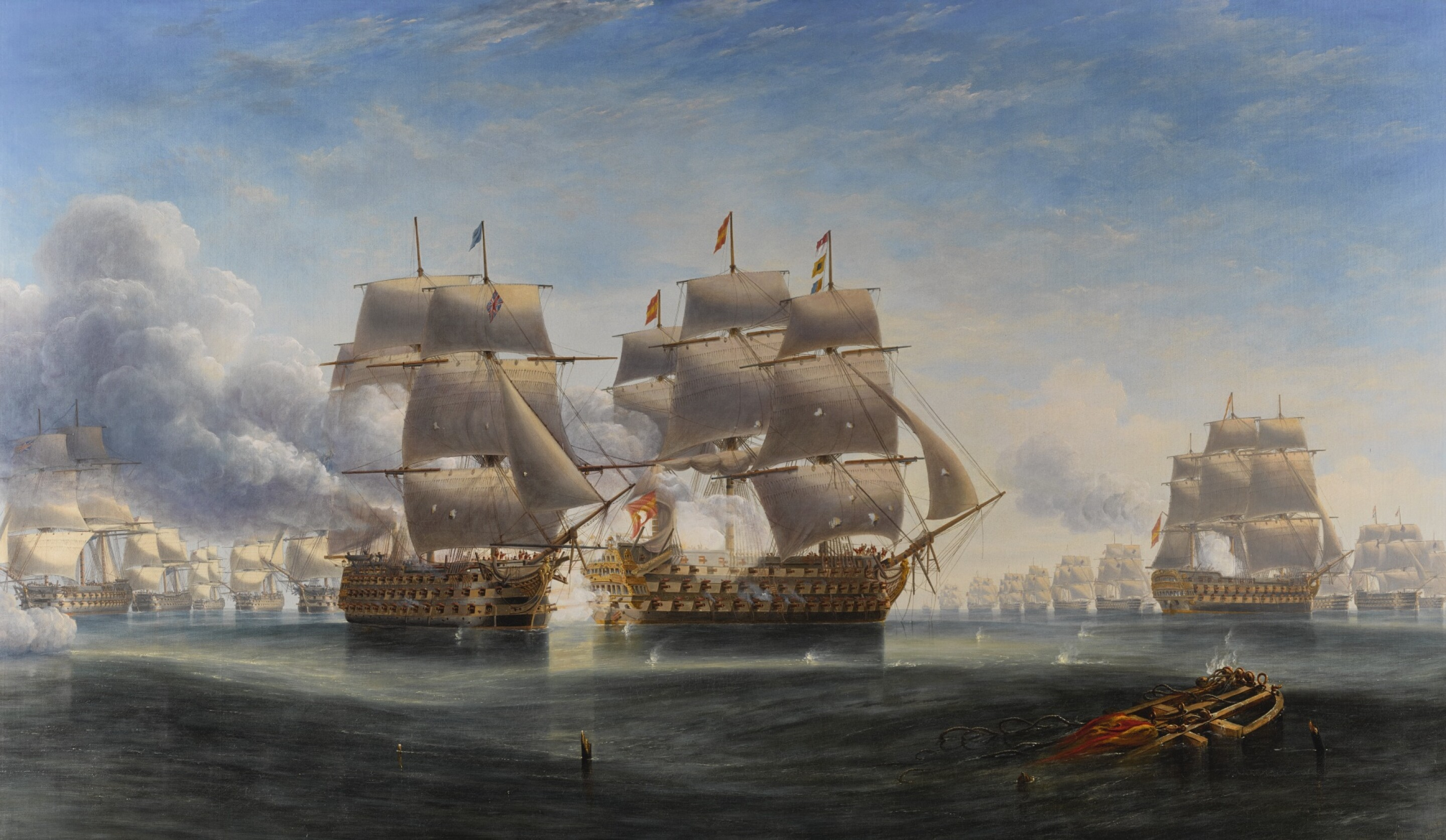
The opening engagement at Trafalgar; Royal Sovereign raking the stern of the Spanish flagship Santa Ana; John Wilson Carmichael

In mid-September, at Nelson's order, Collingwood transferred his flag to the first-rate HMS Royal Sovereign and was appointed second-in-command. On 9 October, Nelson sent Collingwood his plan of attack (the 'Nelson Touch') and this was subsequently relayed to the captains in the fleet. On the morning of 20 October, the combined French and Spanish fleet sailed from Cádiz in October 1805. The Battle of Trafalgar immediately followed on 21 October as the combined fleet's commander, French Vice-admiral Pierre-Charles de Villeneuve, drew up his fleet in the form of a crescent. The British fleet bore down in two separate lines, the one led by Nelson in the first-rate HMS Victory, and the other by Collingwood in Royal Sovereign. On seeing the famous signal from Nelson, England expects that every man will do his duty, he is said to have remarked "I wish Nelson would make no more signals; we all understand what we have to do." However, Collingwood ordered it to be announced to the ship's company, by whom it was received with the greatest enthusiasm.

Royal Sovereign raced ahead of the other British ships at Trafalgar as the ship had recently been given a new layer of copper on its hull. Having drawn considerably ahead of the rest of the fleet, she was the first engaged and was targeted by six ships of the line. "See", said Nelson, pointing to Royal Sovereign as she penetrated the centre of the Franco-Spanish line, "see how that noble fellow Collingwood carries his ship into action!" Probably it was at the same moment that Collingwood, as if in response to the observation of his great commander, remarked to his captain, "What would Nelson give to be here?" Royal Sovereign closed with the 112-gun Santa Ana, the flagship of Spanish Admiral Ignacio María de Álava, and fired several broadsides at close range, causing significant damage to her. This was seen as a feat that owed much to Collingwood's frequent drilling of his gunnery crew: he believed that if a ship could release three well aimed broadsides in five minutes, "no enemy could resist them". Several other vessels came to Santa Ana's assistance and hemmed in Royal Sovereign on all sides; the latter, after being severely damaged, was relieved by the arrival of the rest of the British squadron, but was left unable to manoeuvre as the ship had been dismasted. Not long afterwards Santa Ana struck her colours. Collingwood was wounded in the battle by a splinter that gashed his leg. However, he was wearing silk stockings, as he advised others to also wear, so his leg wound was treated successfully. The problem with such wounds was that cloth would often be forced into a wound as the bullet/fragment penetrated the clothing. Cotton, wool, etc., would tear, but silk was stronger and could be more easily removed from the wound. During the intense firing, one officer reported that he ate an apple while discussing the progress of the fight. Collingwood had been fortunate, as he was one of only three officers left alive on the quarterdeck.

On the death of Nelson, Collingwood assumed command of the fleet and his position as acting commander-in-chief, transferring his flag to the frigate HMS Euryalus because of the damage to the Royal Sovereign. He is said to have shed tears on learning of the death of his friend Nelson. He gave the order for the Royal Sovereign to be towed away from action while she was still afloat. Anticipating that a storm was forming, Nelson had intended that the fleet should anchor after the battle. However, on taking command Collingwood chose not to issue such an order for several reasons, disagreeing with Nelson's earlier command. Many of the British ships and prizes were so damaged that they were unable to anchor, and Collingwood concentrated efforts on taking only those damaged vessels likely to survive the storm in tow. In the ensuing gale, many of the prizes were wrecked on the rocky shore and others were destroyed to prevent their recapture, though no British ship was lost. Collingwood wrote his official dispatch to the Admiralty as two letters on 22 and 24 October, informing Britain of victory in battle and the loss of Nelson.

After the battle, Collingwood was concerned with getting the more heavily-damaged ships away for repairs while maintaining the blockade off Cádiz and other ports. On 9 November 1805, Collingwood was raised to the peerage as Baron Collingwood, of Caldburne and Hethpool in the County of Northumberland. However, the barony was enacted to pass only along the male line and so he later wrote numerous times to the government asking it be amended so his daughters could inherit which did not occur. He also received the thanks of both Houses of Parliament and was awarded a pension of £2,000 per annum. The Patriotic Fund awarded him a £500 commemorative silver vase. Together with all Trafalgar captains and admirals, he also received a Naval Gold Medal, his third, after those for the Glorious First of June and Cape St. Vincent. Only Nelson and Sir Edward Berry share the distinction of three gold medals for service during the wars against France.

== Commander-in-Chief, Mediterranean Fleet ==
Annuity to Lord Collingwood, etc. Act 1806
- Act of Parliament
- Parliament of the United Kingdom
- Long title: An Act for settling and securing certain Annuities on Cuthbert Lord Collingwood, and the several other Persons therein described, in Consideration of the signal and important Service performed by the said Cuthbert Lord Collingwood to His Majesty and the Public.
- Citation: 46 Geo. 3. c. 13
- Territorial extent: United Kingdom

Dates
- Royal assent: 22 March 1806
- Commencement: 22 March 1806 (Note: The Acts of Parliament (Commencement) Act 1793.)
- Repealed: 6 August 1872
Other legislation
Repealed by	Statute Law Revision Act 1872

Status: Repealed

Text of statute as originally enacted

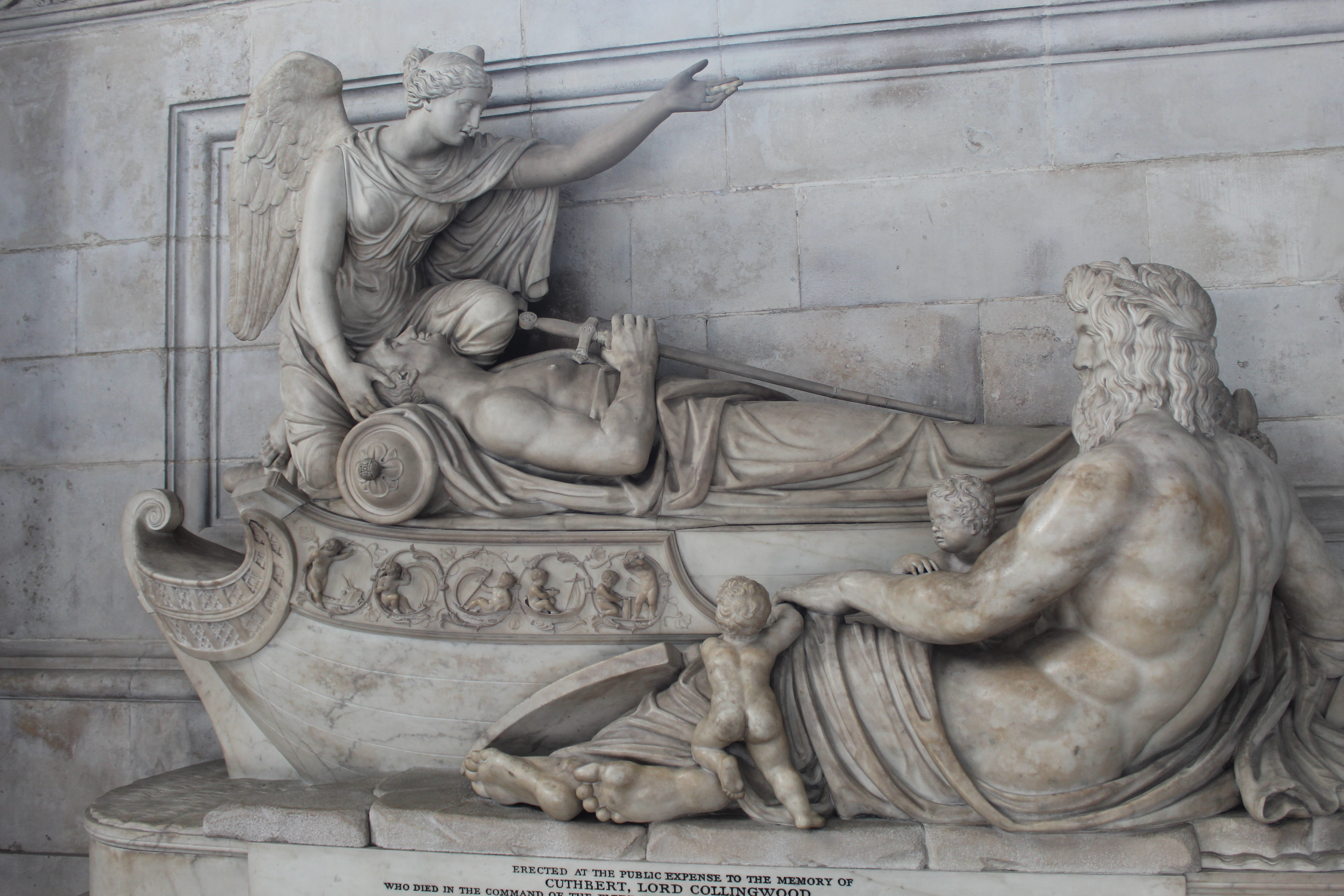
Memorial to Collingwood, St Paul's Cathedral, by Richard Westmacott

On 1 April 1806, Collingwood was formally appointed as Commander-in-Chief, Mediterranean Fleet. He was also elevated to vice-admiral of the red. In 1806, while at sea, he organised the sale of his house at Morpeth after inheriting an estate called Chirton from his wealthy third cousin, Edward Collingwood. The Chirton estate was held in trust and included the estate house, a coal mine, cottages and other buildings. However, Collingwood would not spend any significant time at the property, as he remained on post in the Mediterranean. In October 1806, he transferred his flag to the second-rate HMS Queen and in April 1807 he transferred his flag to the second-rate HMS Ocean.

From Trafalgar until his death, no great naval action was fought in the Mediterranean Sea as a result of the British blockade and manoeuvrings of ships to prevent an enemy fleet from forming. Collingwood's time as Commander-in-Chief would involve maintaining the blockade of French and Spanish ships around the coasts of the Mediterranean. This included preventing French squadrons from sailing from the ports of Toulon and Cartagena. Although several small French squadrons would attempt to run the blockade and one successfully landed troops in the Caribbean two months after Trafalgar, the majority were either intercepted or forced to return to port by superior firepower. Collingwood was occupied in important political and diplomatic transactions in the Mediterranean, in which he displayed tact and judgement. His influence in the Navy was significant at this time, with his role as head of some 30,000 men in ships and ports. On several occasions, he wrote several dispatches and letters to the Admiralty and government urging for more ships to maintain blockades.

He made visits and carried out diplomatic discussions with nations and authorities including Morocco, Naples and the Ottoman Empire. In February 1807, he dispatched ships under his second-in-command Admiral John Duckworth and a squadron to the Dardanelles. The squadron had some minor engagements with the Turkish but eventually withdrew to prevent ships being damaged by bombardment from ashore. Collingwood later visited the Dardanelles himself in August 1807 to negotiate with the Pasha and Sultan under a flag of truce. As a result, the Ottomans agreed to remain neutral in the Mediterranean. In late 1807 and early 1808, he wintered with his ship at Syracuse in Sicily. In March 1808, French forces attempted to sail to Italy but were prevented by the assembly of a fleet of ships under Collingwood. Collingwood also first wrote of his worsening health, with poor bowels and a complaint about lack of exercise having spent several years at sea.

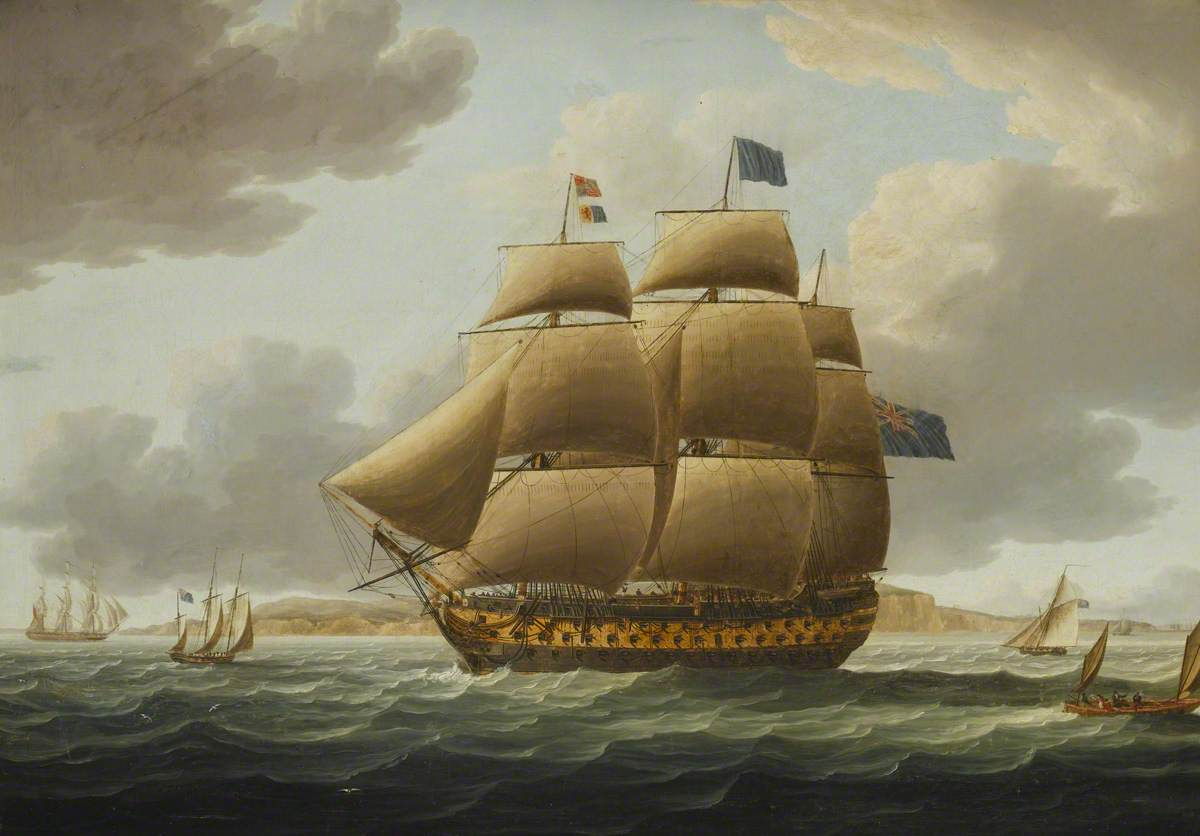
HMS Ville de Paris, the last ship Collingwood sailed on, seen here in a painting by Thomas Buttersworth

In 1808, Collingwood sent ships to support British forces and Spanish partisans during the Peninsular War, including preventing the supply by sea of French forces in Spain. In late 1808 and early 1809, his ship, Ocean undertook repairs and was stationed at Malta. While in Malta, Collingwood was given the additional honorary appointment of major-general of marines. The appointment included some £1,400 as a stipend but carried no duties. In March 1809, Ocean was sent back to England and Collingwood transferred his flag to what would be his last vessel, the first-rate HMS Ville de Paris. Collingwood stationed himself off Port Mahon and Menorca, organising the continuing blockade of French ports, before joining the blockade of Toulon in May 1809. The blockade intercepted a convoy, capturing some 13 ships and destroying two ships of the line in a minor action. It would be the last offensive action of his career.

=== Death ===
Collingwood's own health continued to decline at sea and his pet dog, Bounce, also died from drowning in late 1809. He requested to be relieved of his command of the fleet so that he might return home, however the government urgently required an admiral with the experience and skill of Collingwood to remain, on the grounds that his country could not dispense with his services in the face of the still potent threat that the French and their allies could pose. Over-wintering on his ship off Menorca from October 1809, his health began to decline alarmingly in November 1809 and by February 1810 he could barely walk. He was forced to again request the Admiralty to allow him to return home, which was finally granted in February 1810. He surrendered command of the Mediterranean on 3 March 1810, temporarily to Rear-Admiral George Martin before it passed officially to Sir Charles Cotton.

After finally being given permission to return home, Collingwood died as a result of cancer on board the Ville de Paris, off Port Mahon as he sailed for England, on 7 March 1810. Ville de Paris returned his body to England, where it was then taken by barge up the River Thames to London. His body lay in State for several days at Greenwich Hospital before he was laid to rest beside Nelson in the crypt of St Paul's Cathedral.

On his death, Collingwood's estate was valued at £160,000. This was a considerable sum for the period and especially for a naval officer from a less than affluent background. His will left £40,000 each to both his daughters as specific legacies. As Collingwood died without male issue, his barony became extinct at his death.

== Legacy ==
=== Evaluation ===
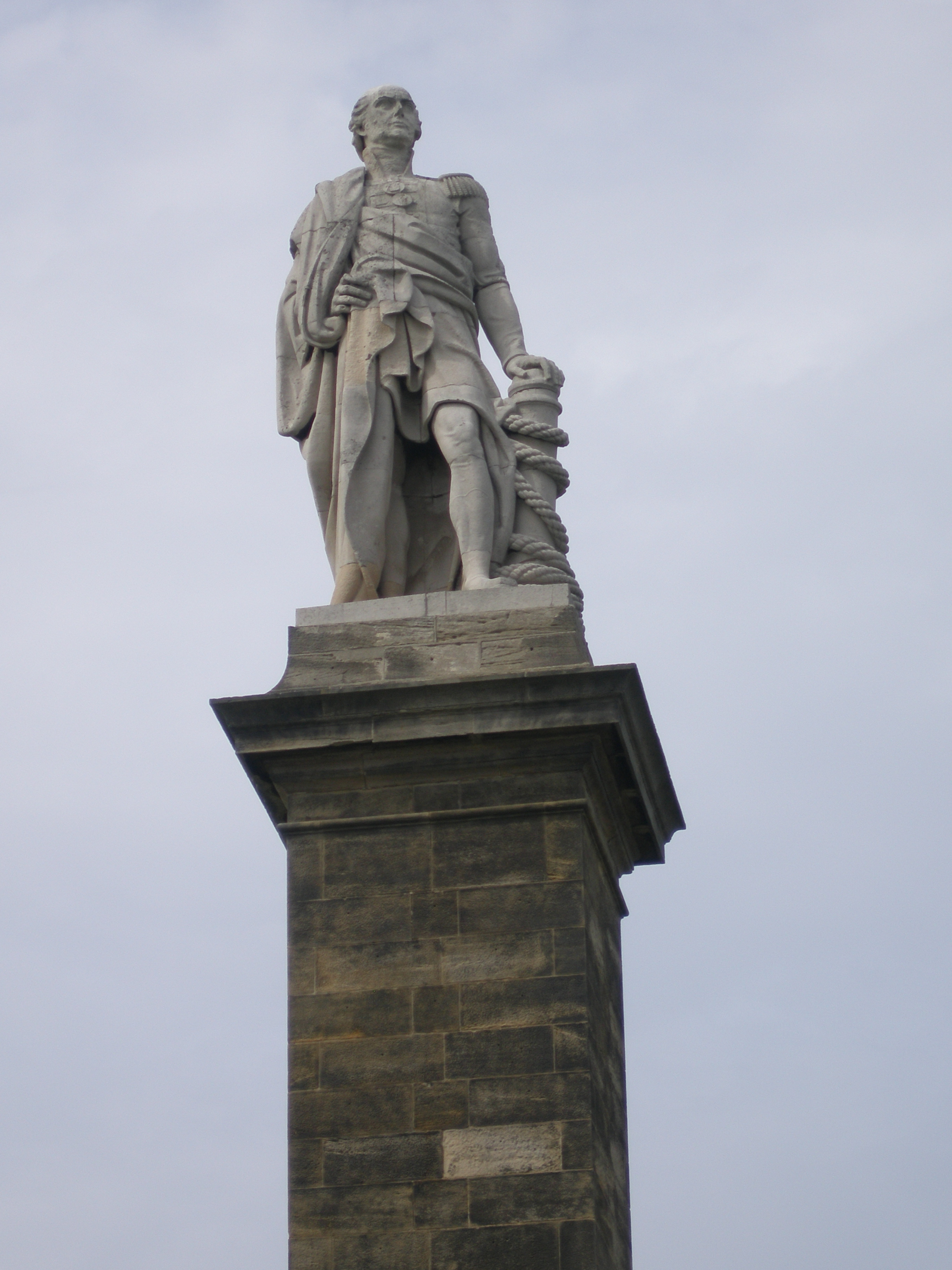
The Collingwood Monument at Tynemouth

Collingwood's merits as a naval officer were in many respects of the first order. His political judgement was remarkable and he was consulted on questions of general policy, of regulation, and even of trade. He was opposed to impressment and to flogging and was considered so kind and generous that he was called "father" by the common sailors. Nelson and Collingwood enjoyed a close friendship, from their first acquaintance in early life until Nelson's death at Trafalgar; and they are both entombed in St Paul's Cathedral.

Collingwood had a reputation for financial prudence and careful investment, including being careful with the spending of naval funds.

Thackeray wrote of Collingwood's virtues stating:

His heroism stirs British hearts when we recall it. His love, and goodness, and piety make one thrill with happy emotion. As one reads of him and his great comrade going into the victory with which their names are immortally connected, how the old English word comes up, and that old English feeling of what I should like to call Christian honour!

With the aim of growing trees for Britain's future, Collingwood was known for dropping acorns as he walked around the countryside. Dudley Pope relates an aspect of Collingwood at the beginning of chapter three of his Life in Nelson's Navy:

Captain Cuthbert Collingwood, later to become an admiral and Nelson's second in command at Trafalgar, had his home at Morpeth, in Northumberland, and when he was there on half pay or on leave he loved to walk over the hills with his dog Bounce. He always started off with a handful of acorns in his pockets, and as he walked he would press an acorn into the soil whenever he saw a good place for an oak tree to grow. Some of the oaks he planted were probably still growing more than a century and a half later ready to be cut to build ships of the line at a time when nuclear submarines are patrolling the seas, because Collingwood's purpose was to make sure that the Navy would never want for oaks to build the fighting ships upon which the country's safety depended.

Collingwood once wrote to his wife that he'd rather his body be added to Britain's sea defences rather than given the pomp of a ceremonial burial.

Robert Hay, a landsman who served under Collingwood, wrote in his memoirs that: "He and his dog Bounce were known to every member of the crew. How attentive he was to the health and comfort and happiness of his crew! A man who could not be happy under him, could have been happy nowhere; a look of displeasure from him was as bad as a dozen at the gangway from another man". Hay also further praised Collingwood, stating that "a better seaman, a better friend to seamen - a more zealous defender of the country's rights and honour, never trod the quarterdeck."

=== Memorials ===
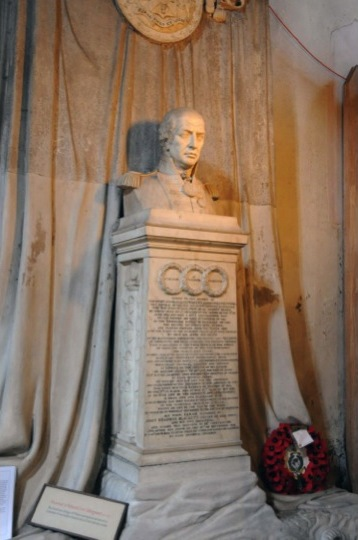
The Collingwood Monument in Newcastle Cathedral

Collingwood has been memorialised in name with a Royal Navy shore establishment, several towns and some 27 streets, schools and public houses. Dedicated to his name, the Maritime Warfare School of the Royal Navy is commissioned as HMS Collingwood, home to training for warfare, weapon engineering and communications disciplines. The town of Collingwood, Ontario, on Georgian Bay in Canada, the suburb of Collingwood in the Australian city of Melbourne, the town of Collingwood, New Zealand, and the Collingwood Channel (an entrance of Howe Sound near Vancouver, British Columbia), are named in his honour. One of the four houses at Collingwood's old school, the Royal Grammar School, Newcastle, is named after him. One of the five houses of British public school Churcher's College is named after him, as is one of the eleven houses at The Royal Hospital School. A battalion of the Royal Naval Division (1914 to 1919) was named after Collingwood. It took part in the Antwerp Campaign (October 1914) and at Gallipoli. The Collingwood Battalion received so many casualties at the Third Battle of Krithia at Gallipoli on 4 June 1915 that it never reformed. From 1978 until 1992, British Rail locomotive 50005 was named Collingwood. In November 2005, English, Welsh & Scottish named locomotive 90020 Collingwood at Newcastle station. The Collingwood Society is a special interest group, open to public membership, dedicated to his memory.

A large monument, the Collingwood Monument, stands in his honour and overlooks the River Tyne at Tynemouth. His Grade II listed statue was sculpted by John Graham Lough and stands atop a pedestal designed by John Dobson. The four cannon on the walls flanking the steps at its base came from his flagship, Royal Sovereign. There is also a carved memorial to him at Newcastle Cathedral.

Collingwood's former temporary residence in Es Castell close to Mahon, Menorca is now a hotel and home to a collection of heirlooms relating to his time on the island.

March 2010 saw the 200th anniversary of Collingwood's death and a number of major events were organised by 'Collingwood 2010' on Tyneside, in Morpeth and the island of Menorca.

=== Literature ===
Letitia Elizabeth Landon celebrates the Admiral in her poetical illustration Admiral Lord Collingwood in Fisher's Drawing Room Scrap Book, 1833. This was an engraving of a variation on the painting by Henry Howard, apparently by his son Frank Howard.

Collingwood was fictionalised as "Admiral Sir John Thornton" in Patrick O'Brian's The Ionian Mission. He appears under his own name in Hornblower and the Atropos, when Hornblower's ship joins the Mediterranean fleet a few months after Trafalgar.

== Arms ==
Coat of arms of Cuthbert Collingwood, 1st Baron Collingwood
Coronet A coronet of an Baron Crest 1st (augmentation): The stern of the Royal Sovereign man of war, in waves, between a branch of laurel and a branch of oak all proper, 2nd: A stag at gaze under an oak tree proper. Escutcheon Argent a chevron between three stags' heads erased sable, with an augmentation, on a chief wavy gules a lion passant guardant navally crowned Or, with the word Trafalgar over the lion of the last. Supporters Dexter, an eagle proper, navally crowned Or; Sinister, a lion, holding in the dexter paw a slip of oak fructed proper. Motto Ferar unus et idem.

== Bibliography ==
- Adams, Max (2005). Admiral Collingwood: Nelson's Own Hero. London: Orion Books. ISBN 978-0297846406.
- Adkins, Roy (2005). Trafalgar: Biography of a Battle. New York: Viking. ISBN 978-0670034482.
- The Naval Chronicle Volume 15, 1806. J. Gold, London (reissued by Cambridge University Press, 2010. ISBN 978-1-108-01854-8).
- Hilton, J. D. (2009). "An Admiral and His Money: Vice-Admiral Cuthbert Collingwood". The Mariner's Mirror. 95 (3): 296–300. doi:10.1080/00253359.2009.10657105. ISSN 0025-3359.
- Murray, Geoffrey (1936). The Life of Admiral Collingwood. London: Hutchinson & Co.
- Warner, Oliver. The Life and Letters of Vice-Admiral Lord Collingwood, Oxford University Press, 1968.
- Oxford Dictionary of National Biography. Article on Collingwood at Volume 12, pages 670–675. Oxford University Press, 2004, ISBN 0198613873.

Military offices
Preceded by Viscount Nelson	Commander-in-Chief, Mediterranean Fleet; 1805–1810	Succeeded by Sir Charles Cotton
