= Courier (1812 ship) =

American / British schooner, wrecked 1819

History

United States
- Name: Courier
- Owner: John Gooding, Wm. T. Graham, Jas. Williams
- Launched: 1812, Baltimore
- Captured: 14 March 1813

United Kingdom
- Name: Courier
- Owner: La Quesne
- Acquired: 1813 by purchase of a prize
- Fate: Wrecked February 1819

General characteristics
- Tons burthen: 244, or 250, or 251 (bm)
- Length: 98 ft 6 in (30.0 m)
- Beam: 24 ft 10 in (7.6 m)
- Sail plan: Schooner
- Complement: US Letter of marque:35; UK letter of marque:25
- Armament: US Letter of marque:6 × 12-pounder carronades; UK letter of marque:10 × 12-pounder carronades

Courier was built at Baltimore in 1812. The British captured her in 1813 and she became a British merchantman based in Jersey. She was wrecked in February 1819.

== Career ==
Courier was built in Baltimore in 1812 and had been commissioned on 26 September 1812. She sailed to France under the command of Captain Robert Davis.

On 14 March 1813 HMS Andromache captured the Baltimore letter of marque Courier, off Nantes. Courier, Captain Robert Davis, was sailing back to Baltimore from Nantes. She arrived at Plymouth on 21 March.

Courier appeared in Lloyds Register (LR) in 1813 with Clements, master, LeQuesne, owner, and trade Plymouth–Jersey. She is described as a schooner, two years old, and an American prize.

Captain John Clement acquired a letter of marque on 27 July 1813.

Year	Master	Owner	Trade	Source
1815	Clement	Le Quesne	Plymouth–Jersey	LR
1820	Clement	Le Quisne	Plymouth–Newfoundland	Register of Shipping (RS)

== Fate ==
A letter from Jersey dated 22 February 1819, reported that "Courier, of this port, late Mauger"' had struck a rock 4 nautical miles (7.4 km) off Jersey. She sank just outside the port. By cutting her masts and discharging part of her cargo she was later refloated and taken in to Jersey in a severely damaged condition. She had been on a voyage from Rio de Janeiro to Jersey; her sugar and coffee was totally spoilt. The Weymouth-Channel Islands packet Countess of Liverpool rescued the crew.
