= Hinchingbrooke =

Hinchingbrooke may refer to any of the following structures near Huntingdon, Cambridgeshire, England:

- Hinchingbrooke Hospital, a small district general hospital
- Hinchingbrooke House, adjacent to and now administered by Hinchingbrooke School
- Hinchingbrooke School, a short distance from Hinchingbrooke Hospital

== See also ==
- Hinchinbrooke (disambiguation)
- Hinchinbrook (disambiguation)
