= Countess of Liverpool (1814 ship) =

Packet ship

History

United Kingdom
- Name: Countess of Liverpool
- Namesake: Louisa Jenkinson, Countess of Liverpool
- Ordered: Robert Naylor
- Launched: 1814, Portland (Weymouth)
- Fate: Broken up 1834

General characteristics
- Tons burthen: 103, or 104(bm)
- Length: 62 ft 2 in (18.9 m), or 61 ft 9 in (18.8 m)
- Beam: 20 ft 1 in (6.1 m), or 20 ft 2 in (6.1 m)
- Depth of hold: 10 ft 1 in (3.1 m)
- Sail plan: Cutter
- Complement: 9 (Note: Commander, sailing master, six ableseamen, and one ordinary seaman.)
- Notes: Square sterned, with flush deck

Countess of Liverpool was launched in 1814, at Portland (Weymouth). She served from February 1814 to July 1827, as a Weymouth–Channel Islands sailing packet. From 1828, she started sailing to Brazil, and from 1830, to India. In 1833, she became leaky while sailing in the Indian Ocean. She was condemned in 1833, and then broken up at Mauritius in 1834.

== Career ==
Robert Naylor, formerly an owner-captain of a Falmouth packet, had Countess of Liverpool built For the Channel Islands. She was launched in November 1813, and registered in February 1814, with Naylor as master and owner. Another source reports that on 22 January 1814, Countess of Liverpool, Robert White, master, sailed to the Channel Islands on her first voyage as a packet on the Weymouth-Channel Islands run.

Debts forced Naylor within two days of her registration to sell a one-eighth share in Countess of Liverpool, and within another month of two further eighths. In May 1816, his creditors took over the remaining five-eighths. Countess of Liverpool was withdrawn for a year with Sir William Curtis, a Ramsgate cutter, replacing her from June 1816 to June 1817.

In June 1817, the Post Office appointed Robert White to replace Naylor. In August, White acquired the five-eighths held by Naylor's creditors, and eventually another one-eighth. He never became sole-owner though, which was unusual in the packet trade.

On 22 February 1819, Courier struck a rock and sank 4 nautical miles (7.4 km) off Jersey. She was on a voyage from Rio de Janeiro to Jersey. Countess of Liverpool rescued the crew. Courier was later refloated and taken in to Jersey in a severely damaged condition.

In 1825, command of Countess of Liverpool was transferred to Richard White.

In 1826, the two other packets on the Weymouth–Channel Islands route, Hinchinbrook and Francis Freeling, were both lost. The Post Office purchased Countess of Liverpool from Captain White for £1,6777 14s 8d. It then sold her in 1827, or 1828.

Countess of Liverpool moved to the Thames after the Post Office, in 1827, introduced steam packets to replace the sailing packets. She then started sailing between London and Brazil. The Post Office purchased her from her owner, and then immediately sold her, at a loss.

She first appeared in Lloyd's Register (LR) in 1828.

Year	Master	Owner	Trade	Source & notes
1828	F.Paas	Vanlestor	London–Bahia	LR
1830	F.Paas; J.Watson	VanZeller; J.Talbot	Falmouth–Brazils	LR; some repairs 1830

In 1813, the British East India Company (EIC), had lost its monopoly on the trade between India and Britain. British ships were then free to sail to India or the Indian Ocean under a licence from the EIC. In 1830, Countess of Liverpool underwent small repairs and then on 3 July, sailed to Île de France.

Year	Master	Owner	Trade	Source & notes
1831	Watson	J.Talbert & Co.	London–Isle de France (Mauritius)	LR

== Fate ==
On 3 October 1833, Countess of Liverpool, Talberts, master, put into Mahé, Seychelles, leaking badly. She was surveyed there, condemned, and sold. She arrived at Mauritius in April 1834, for breaking up.
