= HMS Hinchinbrook =

Four ships of the Royal Navy have borne the name HMS Hinchinbrook. (Note: The spelling variations Hinchinbroke, Hinchinbrooke, Hinchingbroke, Hinchingbrook and Hinchingbrooke are also sometimes seen.)

- HMS Hinchinbrook (1744) was a 10-gun sloop launched in 1744 that the French captured in 1746.
- HMS Hinchinbrook (1777) was a 14-gun brig, previously named Britannia and then the privateer American Tartar. The Royal Navy captured her in 1777, used her as a slop ship from 1780 and sold her in 1783. She then became the mercantile Blenheim, which primarily served as a Greenland whaler until two French frigates captured and burnt her in 1806.
- HMS Hinchinbrook (1778 sloop) was a 12-gun sloop in service in 1778 that the Americans captured that year at the Frederica naval action.
- HMS Hinchinbrook (1778) was a 28-gun sixth rate, previously the French merchant vessel Astree. She was captured in 1778 and foundered in 1782, but with no loss of life.
