= HMS Hinchinbrook (1778) =

Frigate of the Royal Navy

History

Great Britain
- Name: Hinchinbrook
- Launched: 1778
- Acquired: Captured on 13 October 1778; Purchased on 1 December 1778
- Commissioned: December 1778
- Fate: Wrecked 19 January 1782

General characteristics
- Class & type: 28-gun sixth rate frigate
- Tons burthen: 557 (bm)
- Length: 115 ft (35 m)
- Beam: 33 ft 3 in (10.13 m)
- Depth of hold: 15 ft (4.6 m)
- Propulsion: Sails
- Sail plan: Full-rigged ship
- Complement: 200
- Armament: Gun deck: 24 × 9-pounder guns; QD: 4 × 6-pounder guns

HMS Hinchinbrook was the French privateer Astrée, which the British captured in 1778 and took into the Royal Navy as a 28-gun sixth-rate frigate. (Note: The spelling of the name was widely varied, and numerous versions exist even in the current literature. Variations include Hinchinbroke, Hinchinbrooke, Hinchingbroke, Hinchingbrook and Hinchingbrooke.) She was Captain Horatio Nelson's second navy command, after the brig HMS Badger, and his first as post-captain. She was wrecked, with no loss of life, in January 1783.

== Privateering career ==
Hinchinbrook started life as the French merchant vessel Astrée, built in 1778 at Nantes, and her owners were Guilliaume and Son, of that city. (Note: Demerliac lists the vessel as a privateer, but unfortunately has no additional information.) She was carrying a cargo of bricks and bale goods from Nantes when a British squadron under Captain Joseph Deane in HMS Ruby captured her off Cape François, on 13 October 1778. She was described as being a ship of 650 tons, armed with 14 guns, and under the command of Louis David, master. A prize crew then took her into port, where the Royal Navy purchased her for the sum of £5,650 on 1 December 1778, renaming her as a courtesy to Viscount Hinchinbroke, eldest son of John Montagu, 4th Earl of Sandwich, First Lord of the Admiralty in Lord North's administration.

== British career ==
Admiral Sir Peter Parker had intended to have Hinchinbrook upgraded to a 32-gun fifth rate, but this never came about. Instead, she became a 28-gun sixth rate, with a crew of 200 men. She was commissioned that December at Jamaica under Commander Christopher Parker. In May 1779, Captain Charles Nugent replaced Parker, who had been promoted to post captain in March. In September, Captain Horatio Nelson took command of Hinchinbrook and escorted a convoy to Greytown, Nicaragua.

Nelson and Hinchinbrook were based in the San Juan River from January until April 1780. Hinchinbrook's assignment was to support an expedition that Major-General John Dalling's wanted to capture the Spanish colonies in Central America, including an assault on the fortress of San Juan. Hinchinbrook was to take troops to the mouth of the San Juan River and wait for their return. The troops would go 70 miles up the river, take the fort, and then go on to capture other Spanish possessions. The expeditionary force was small, it was the dry season and so the river was low, and the climate was putrid. Nelson decided to leave Hinchinbrook and take the troops up the river himself. He used small boats that would ground in the shallows and have to be dragged by hand. At one point, a barefoot Nelson led a small group of sailors to capture the out fort of San Bartholomew. The force eventually did reach Fort San Juan and captured it, but between war and disease, about 140 of Hinchinbrook's crew of 200 men died and the whole expedition too was decimated. Nelson himself became ill, and debilitated by dysentery, withdrew Hinchinbrook back down the river. His friend Captain Cuthbert Collingwood replaced him in command of Hinchinbrook and brought the remainder of the expedition back to Jamaica. (Nelson and Collingwood had served together three years earlier in Lowestoffe; the transport Victor took Nelson from Hinchinbrook to Jamaica, where he took command of the frigate HMS Janus of 44 guns.)

Collingwood remained in command of Hinchinbrook until December, when Captain Charles Hotchkys replaced him. Hotchkys's replacement, in February 1781, was Captain George Stoney, who in turn was replaced by Captain Sylverius Moriaty in June 1781. Moriaty was one among many navy personnel who suffered in the unhealthy climate of the West Indies; he was twice relieved during his period of command by Captain John Fish due to his health problems. Fish last commanded Hinchinbrook from 21 September 1781 to 12 February 1782, but apparently was on six weeks leave in January 1782.

On 13 January 1782 Admiral Peter Parker appointed Lieutenant John Markham to command Hinchinbroke. Markham's orders were to cruise off the east end of Jamaica to protect trade.

== Fate ==
Hinchinbrook left Port Royal, Jamaica on 19 January 1782 and almost immediately started to take on water. The next day Markham decided to try to get to St Anne's Bay, Jamaica but as she approached the harbour she stopped responding to the helm and she ran aground on the west reef going into the harbour. Despite numerous efforts, her crew was unable to get her over or off the reef. A schooner came alongside and took off her guns, some stores, and her crew. She then sank that night. (Note: Curiously, the biography of Markham makes no mention of the sinking and subsequent court martial. It reports that on 28 February he completed his task and that on 13 March he was appointed to command the fire ship Volcano, then at Port Royal.) Later her anchor was retrieved and placed as a roadside marker in Priory, Saint Ann's Bay.
