= Hethpool House =

House in Hethpool, Northumberland, England

Coordinates: 55°32′57″N 2°9′59″W

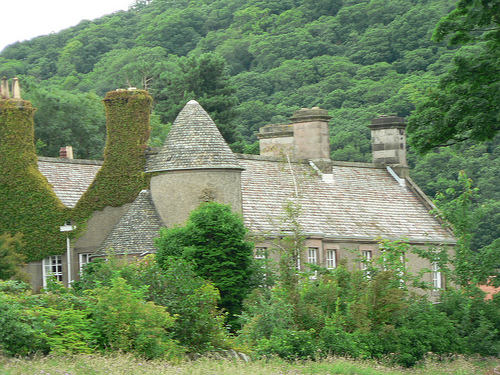
Hethpool House, Kirknewton

Hethpool House is an Edwardian house in Hethpool, in the civil parish of Kirknewton, near Wooler, Northumberland, England which has Grade II listed building status. Built in 1919 on the site of a late 17th-century house which had been the seat of Admiral Lord Collingwood, it was improved in the Arts and crafts style in 1928 for Sir Arthur Munro Sutherland Bt.

The grounds include the remains of an ancient pele tower, Hethpool Tower, which was a small fortified 14th-century tower house, and which is now a Scheduled Ancient Monument and Grade II listed building.
