= HMS Badger (1777) =

Brig of the Royal Navy

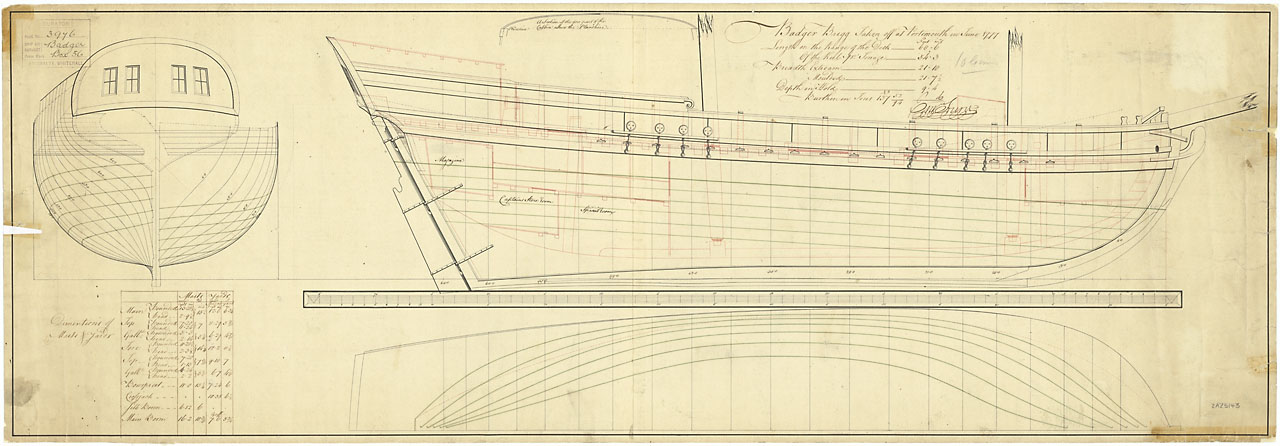
- Badger

History

Great Britain
- Name: HMS Badger
- Acquired: November 1777
- Fate: Sold in June 1783

General characteristics
- Type: Brig
- Propulsion: Sails
- Sail plan: brig
- Complement: 90
- Armament: 12 guns?

HMS Badger was a brig rigged Sloop-of-War in service with the Royal Navy in the late eighteenth century. Badger is notable as being the first Royal Navy ship to be commanded by Horatio Nelson.

== Career ==
Badger was one of a number of ships purchased for service on the North America and West Indies Station during the American Revolutionary War. She was previously an American merchant vessel, Defence, and had been purchased in Jamaica in November 1777 for £1,540. She replaced an earlier HMS Badger that had been bought the previous year but condemned as unfit for service in 1777. Little is known about her specifications, but she probably carried 12 guns, and was apparently 'capable of carrying 16 guns'.

Her first commander was Commander (listed as Lieutenant, February, 1778) Michael John Everett, who brought with him the crew of the earlier Badger. On 28 January, 1778 she captured schooner "Liberty" off Turks Island. On 12 February she captured schooner "Tryall" 29 Leagues off Turks Island. On 28 March her barge captured sloop "Washington" off Monti Christi. On 1 April, 1778 she captured brig Dartmouth. On 9 April 1778 she pursued and captured a privateer that ran aground 5 miles from Jean Rabel Bay, Saint-Domingue. On 8 December 1778 the commander of the North America and West Indies Station, Sir Peter Parker, transferred a young lieutenant named Horatio Nelson, who had previously been serving aboard his flagship HMS Bristol, to the command of Badger, and moved Everett to command the newly captured and commissioned 18-gun sloop Port Royal. Badger was Nelson's first experience of command of one of the Royal Navy's commissioned warships, and he duly took command in January 1779. Nelson spent half of 1779 cruising the Caribbean, ranging off the Spanish colonies in Central America in search of prizes. Nelson did not have much success, but on 11 June 1779 Parker promoted Nelson to post captain and gave him the command of the 28-gun frigate HMS Hinchinbroke. On 20 June Nelson duly handed Badger over to Commander Cuthbert Collingwood.

Collingwood commanded Badger until early 1780, and in March that year he was succeeded by Commander Samuel Walker. Walker was replaced in September that year by Commander Richard Storey, who was commander in an acting capacity. It had been planned that Commander Donald Sutherland would take over command, but he had died on 9 September, after only two days in command. In December 1780 Commander James Cornwallis took over. Badger was temporarily under Lieutenant William Sykes between January 1781 and possibly March 1782. Badger was paid off at Jamaica in May 1782, and was sold there in June the following year for £2,050.

|- |Dolphin | (Kingdom of Great Britain) Royal Navy |The sloop, captured 218 miles off Sandy Hook by HMS Experiment (Royal Navy), was wrecked on Long Island between 11 February and 9 March.
