= John Graham Lough =

English sculptor (1798–1876)

John Graham Lough (1798–1876), in His Studio, Artist: Ralph Hedley 1881

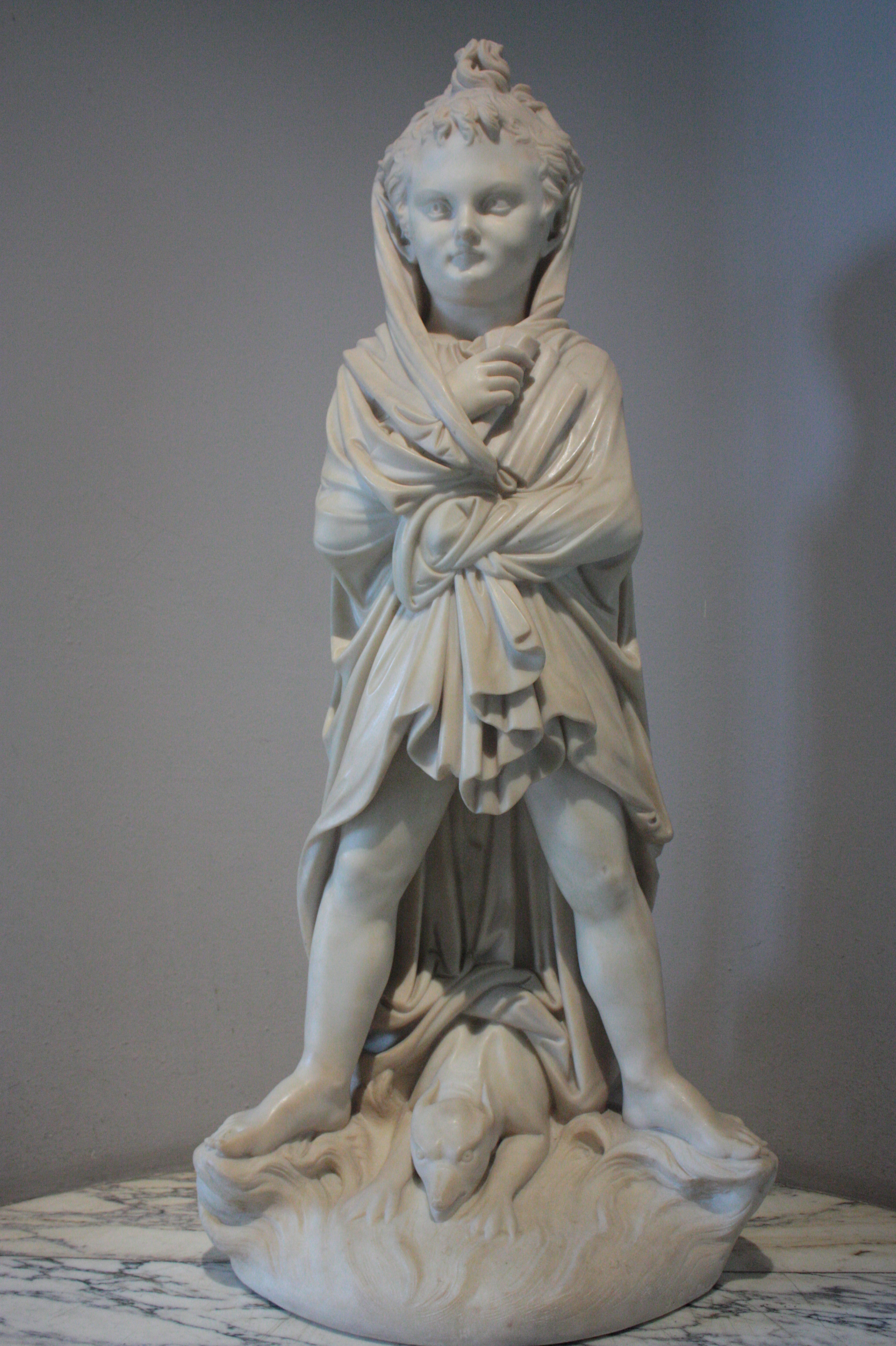
Puck by John Graham Lough, V&A, London

John Graham Lough (8 January 1798 – 8 April 1876) was an English sculptor known for his funerary monuments and a variety of portrait sculpture. He also produced ideal classical male and female figures.

== Life ==
John Graham Lough was born at Black Hedley Port, Greenhead near Consett, County Durham, one of eleven children born to William Lough of Aycliff, County Durham and Barbara Clementson of Dalton, Northumberland. His father was a farmer near Hexham and he may himself have worked as a farmer in his youth. He was later apprenticed to a stonemason, at Shotley Field near Newcastle upon Tyne. He later found work in Newcastle as an ornamental sculptor and carved the decorations on the building of the city's Literary and Philosophical Society.

Lough came to London by sea in 1825 to study the Elgin Marbles at the British Museum. He took lodgings on the first floor in Burleigh Street, above a greengrocer's shop, and there commenced to mould his colossal statue of Milo of Croton based on his studies of the Elgin Marbles and the work of Michelangelo. In 1826 he joined the Royal Society Schools with the support of John Thomas Smith and became the protégé of the painter Benjamin Haydon. The following year he exhibited the completed statue. (A later 1863 bronze version survives at Blagdon, Northumberland). It so impressed London society that it brought him scores of patrons and established his career.

He began exhibiting ideal figures and heads at the Royal Academy from 1826. Between 1834 and 1838, he spent a period in Rome where his portrait style was influenced by Neo-classicism.

Lough received a provisional commission to carve four granite lions for the base of Nelson's Column. However, in 1846, after consultations with the column's designer, William Railton, he withdrew from the project, unwilling to work under the constraints imposed by the architect The commission was later given to Edwin Landseer who, with assistance from the sculptor Carlo Marochetti, carried out the work in bronze, finally completing it in 1867.

He was a close friend of the surgeon Campbell De Morgan who sat with Lough as he lay dying of pneumonia. A bust of De Morgan by Lough was given to the Middlesex Hospital medical school and is on display there. Lough is buried in Kensal Green cemetery, London.

One of his younger brothers, Thomas, was a talented musician, artist, and poet, best known for "The Ramshaw Flood" (1848), but declined into vagrancy and poverty, dying at Lanchester Workhouse only a year after John Graham's death.

== Works ==
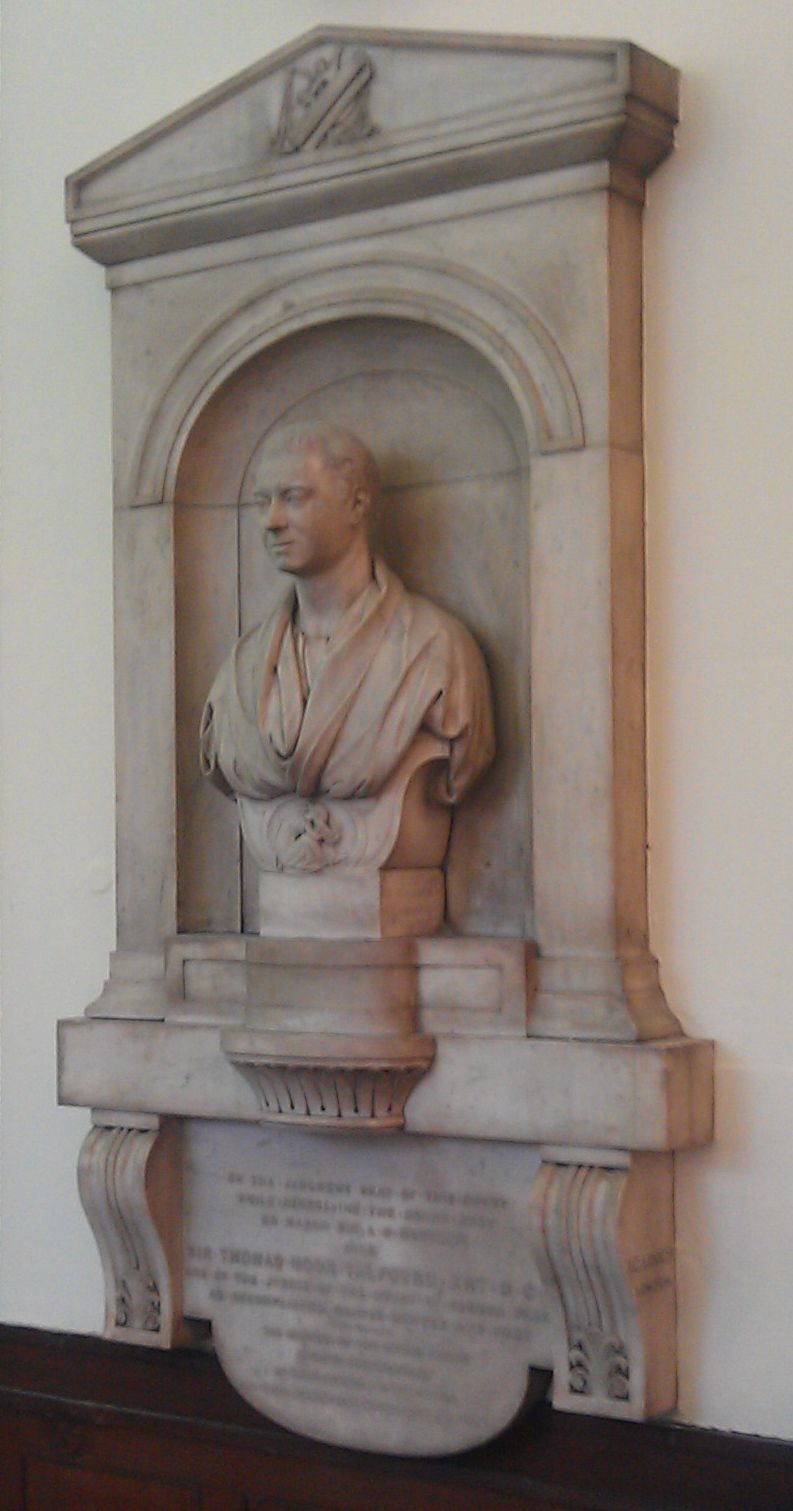
Lough's memorial to Thomas Noon Talfourd, in the Shire Hall, Stafford

Lough's public works include a statue of Lord Collingwood in Tynemouth, a memorial to Thomas Noon Talfourd, in the Shire Hall, Stafford, and the bronze George Stephenson memorial of 1862, opposite the North of England Institute of Mining and Mechanical Engineers Newcastle upon Tyne.

In London, he produced the monuments to Henry Montgomery Lawrence and to Bishop Middleton in St Paul's Cathedral, and made the Queen Victoria and Prince Albert for the Royal Exchange. In Canterbury Cathedral, he was responsible for the monuments to Bishop Broughton, and to Lt Col Frederick Mackeson.

Lough produced many ideal works on classical, historical and literary themes, including a series of marble statues of Shakespearean subjects for his chief patron Matthew, 4th Baronet Ridley.

Although he was a prolific sculptor, he was also a controversial one, as his work divided opinion about its merits. The Literary Gazette was a fervent supporter, proclaiming his first exhibition as a demonstration of his "extraordinary genius" and a later sculptural group as a work which "nineteen out of twenty people would prefer ... to any other work in the exhibition." The Art Journal was just as fervently critical, damning his statue of Queen Victoria for the Royal Exchange as "an odiously coarse production, in which not one feature of the Queen is recognisable", and of such "gross vulgarity" that it exceeded "the worst production that has ever been publicly exhibited."

== Bibliography ==
- John Lough (Author), Elizabeth Merson (Contributor), John Graham Lough, 1798–1876: A Northumbrian Sculptor Boydell & Brewer Inc (1987) ISBN 0-85115-480-8
