= Hinchinbroke =

Ship used for mail delivery in Britain

History

United Kingdom
- Name: Hinchinbrooke
- Builder: Bligh, Falmouth
- Launched: 6 November 1812
- Fate: Wrecked 25 July 1813

General characteristics
- Tons burthen: 180 (bm)
- Complement: 28 (Note: In addition to the crew, the packets had accommodations for six passengers.)
- Armament: 8 × 9-pounder + 4 × 12-pounder guns (Note: The 9-pounder guns were commonly known as "Post Office guns". For reasons of weight, the 12-pounder guns were probably actually carronades.)
- Notes: This Hinchinbroke may readily be confused with Hinchinbrooke (1814 ship)

Hinchinbroke, of 180 tons (bm), was a packet for the Post Office Packet Service, launched near Falmouth and operating out of Falmouth, Cornwall. She was launched on 6 November 1812, at Mr. Bligh's Yard, near Falmouth. She was under the command of Captain James, whom the Postmaster General had promoted for his "uniformly good and successful conduct while Master of the Marlborough."

She was at Gibraltar on 8 February 1813, and on the 10th, sailed for Malta. She left Malta on 18 March, and Gibraltar on 9 April. She arrived at Falmouth on 4 May.

On 18 June, she arrived at Barbados from Falmouth. She sailed from Jamaica on 19 July, bound for Falmouth.

Hinchinbrook was wrecked on 25 July 1813, on Watland Island or Watling Key, The Bahamas with the loss of Mr. H. Thomas, the surgeon. The mail and the ship's stores were lost. Hinchinbroke, James, master, was on a voyage from Jamaica to London. Another source gives the date of loss as 19 July, but agrees the locus and number of casualties.

The Register of Shipping for 1814 (published in 1813), showed her with James as master and owner, her trade as Falmouth–Jamaica, and her origin as Falmouth in 1813.
