= HMS Sampson (1781) =

Ship of the line of the Royal Navy

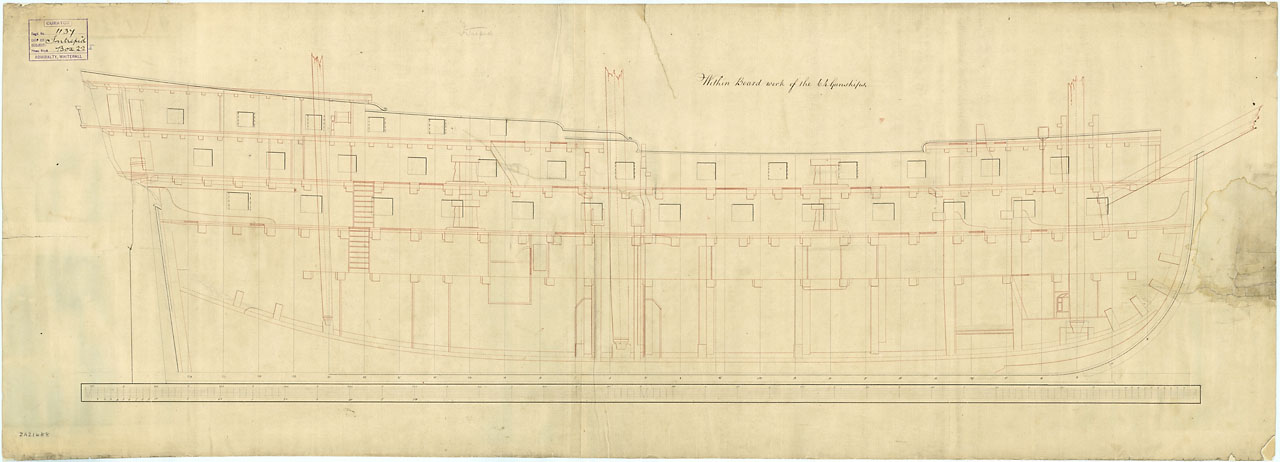
- Sampson

History

Great Britain
- Name: HMS Sampson
- Ordered: 25 July 1775
- Builder: Woolwich Dockyard
- Laid down: 20 October 1777
- Launched: 8 May 1781
- Fate: Broken up, 1832

General characteristics
- Class & type: Intrepid-class ship of the line
- Tons burthen: 1380 bm
- Length: 159 ft 6 in (48.62 m) (gundeck)
- Beam: 44 ft 4 in (13.51 m)
- Depth of hold: 19 ft (5.8 m)
- Propulsion: Sails
- Sail plan: Full-rigged ship
- Armament: 64 guns: Gundeck: 26 × 24 pdrs; Upper gundeck: 26 × 18 pdrs; Quarterdeck: 10 × 4 pdrs; Forecastle: 2 × 9 pdrs

HMS Sampson was a 64-gun third rate ship of the line of the Royal Navy, launched on 8 May 1781 at Woolwich.

She was hulked in 1802 and broken up in 1832.

== See also ==
- Samson § Military
