= Hinchinbrook (ship) =

History

United Kingdom
- Name: Hinchinbrook
- Launched: 1811, Bridport
- Fate: Wrecked 2 February 1826

General characteristics
- Tons burthen: 80, or 90 (bm)
- Length: 60 ft 0 in (18.3 m)
- Beam: 19 ft 8 in (6.0 m)
- Sail plan: Cutter

Hinchinbrook was a cutter launched in 1811 that served the Post Office Packet Service from July 1811. She sailed between Weymouth, Dorset, and the Channel Islands until she was wrecked on 2 February 1826.

Hinchinbrook was registered in Weymouth. (Note: The Weymouth register is the only one of the eighteenth century registers from the home station packet ports that is extant.)

== Loss ==
Thomas Quirk was Hinchinbrook's master when she wrecked 2 February 1826 near Longy, Alderney. Her 23 crew and passengers and mails were saved. Another report states that she was carrying seven crew members and 17 passengers.

She was sailing past Alderney towards Guernsey in fine weather when she struck a submerged rock and rapidly filled with water and sank. The mails and all 24 crew and passengers took to the ship's boats and landed safely in Alderney. A committee of inquiry absolved the crew but judged Captain Quirk responsible. He was 67 years old and was pensioned off two months later.

Hinchinbrook was the first government packet to be wrecked. The loss of Hinchinbrook, followed by the loss later that year of Francis Freeling, left the Weymouth packet service short two vessels of the three on the route. Because the Post Office was expecting to introduce steam packets within a year or so it decide to make do with temporary solutions.

The Weymouth Packet Service borrowed Iris, which had been a Milford packet but now was in reserve at Holyhead, Samuel and Julia, a local lugger, and Dove. Steam service began on 7 July 1827 when Watersprite took out the first Channel mail to move by steam. Iris returned to Holyhead.

== See also ==
- List of Weymouth–Channel Islands Sailing Packets (1794-1826)
