= Hinchinbrooke (1814 ship) =

UK mail ship 1814-1816

History

United Kingdom
- Name: Hinchinbrook
- Launched: 1812, America,
- Acquired: circa 1814
- Fate: Wrecked May 1816

General characteristics
- Tons burthen: 195 (bm)
- Sail plan: Brig
- Complement: 1814:32; 1815: 21 (peace establishment)
- Armament: 1814: 8 × 9 + 4 × 12-pounder guns; Peace establishment:2 × 6 or 9-pounder guns
- Notes: This Hinchinbrook may readily be confused with Hinchinbroke (1812 ship)

Hinchinbrook was built in America in 1812. By 1814, she was carrying mails for the Post Office Packet Service from Falmouth, Cornwall. In May 1814, she repelled an attack by an American privateer in a single-ship action. She was wrecked in May 1816.

== Career ==
Hinchinbrook first appeared in Lloyd's Register in 1815, in the section listing Falmouth Packets. Her master was James, and her owner the Government Post Office. She had been raised in 1814. She also appeared in the regular listing with the same information, but the addition of the voyage Falmouth–Jamaica.

On 14 February 1814, Hinchinbrook sailed for the Leeward Islands.

On 2 May 1814, Hinchinbrook was at 49°35′N 20°59′W when she encountered an American privateer of 18 guns. An engagement ensued during which the privateer, which was full of men, unsuccessfully twice attempted to board Hinchinbrook. After two hours and twenty minutes, the privateer withdrew. Hinchinbrook had one man killed and eight wounded, one of whom died later. Her sails, rigging, and masts were damaged, and she had four feet of water in her hold. She also lost some of her mail, which was hanging in slings in case it needed to be jettisoned, and which a shot carried away.

The privateer was Grand Turk, which had a crew of 175 men. Her losses were two men.

Hinchinbrook returned to Falmouth from the Leeward Islands on 20 May.

On 31 March 1815, Captain James sailed from Falmouth, bound for New York. Hinchinbrook arrived at Halifax, Nova Scotia, on 25 April, and left on 28 April. She arrived at New York on 4 May, and left on 18 May. She arrived at Halifax again on 23 May, and left on 28 May. She arrived back at Falmouth on 22 July. At some point Captain Dunston replaced James.

On 17 December, Captain Dunstone (acting) sailed from Falmouth, bound for New York. Hinchinbrook arrived at Bermuda on 16 January 1816, and left the next day. She arrived at New York on 2 February, and left on 9 March. She arrived at Halifax on 17 March, and left on the 21st. She arrived back at Falmouth on 15 April.

== Loss ==
Hinchinbrook Packet, was wrecked on 7 May 1816, on Cape St. Vincent, Portugal. All on board were rescued. She was on a voyage from Falmouth, Cornwall to a Mediterranean port. Her mails were saved and forwarded on a vessel hired for the occasion.
