= John Croft =

John Croft may refer to:

- John Croft (Australian politician) (1871–c. 1913), Senator for Western Australia
- John Croft (MP) (died 1420) for Lancashire
- John Croft (wine merchant) (1732–1820), English businessman, antiquarian and writer
- Sir John Croft, 1st Baronet (1778–1862), English diplomat
- John R. Croft, United States Air National Guard general
- John Croft (architect) (1800–1865), British architect
- Sir John Croft, 4th Baronet (c. 1735–1797)
- John Croft (surgeon) (1833–1905), English surgeon
- Sir John Frederick Croft, 2nd Baronet (1828–1904), of the Croft baronets
- Sir John William Graham Croft, 4th Baronet (1910–1979), of the Croft baronets
- Sir John Archibald Radcliffe Croft, 5th Baronet (1910–1990), of the Croft baronets
- John Croft (died 1904), an explosives expert who died clearing ruins in the Great Fire of Toronto (1904)

== See also ==
- John Crofts (disambiguation)
- Croft (surname)
