= Anne Fleming =

Anne Fleming may refer to:

- Anne Fleming (writer) (born 1964), Canadian author
- Anne Fleming, Playboy Playmate of the Month, September 1955
- Anne Fleming and Catherine Jennis, 18th-century domestic partners buried together in England
- Ann Fleming (1913–1981), or Anne Fleming, British hostess and the wife of Ian Fleming

== See also ==
- Ann Marie Fleming (born 1962), Asian-Canadian filmmaker, writer and visual artist
- Anne Fleming Leavenworth (1840–1879), wife of, and Anne Fleming Cameron (1873–1961), daughter of businessman Roderick Cameron
