= Ireland Shakespeare forgeries =

Fabricated Shakespearian writings

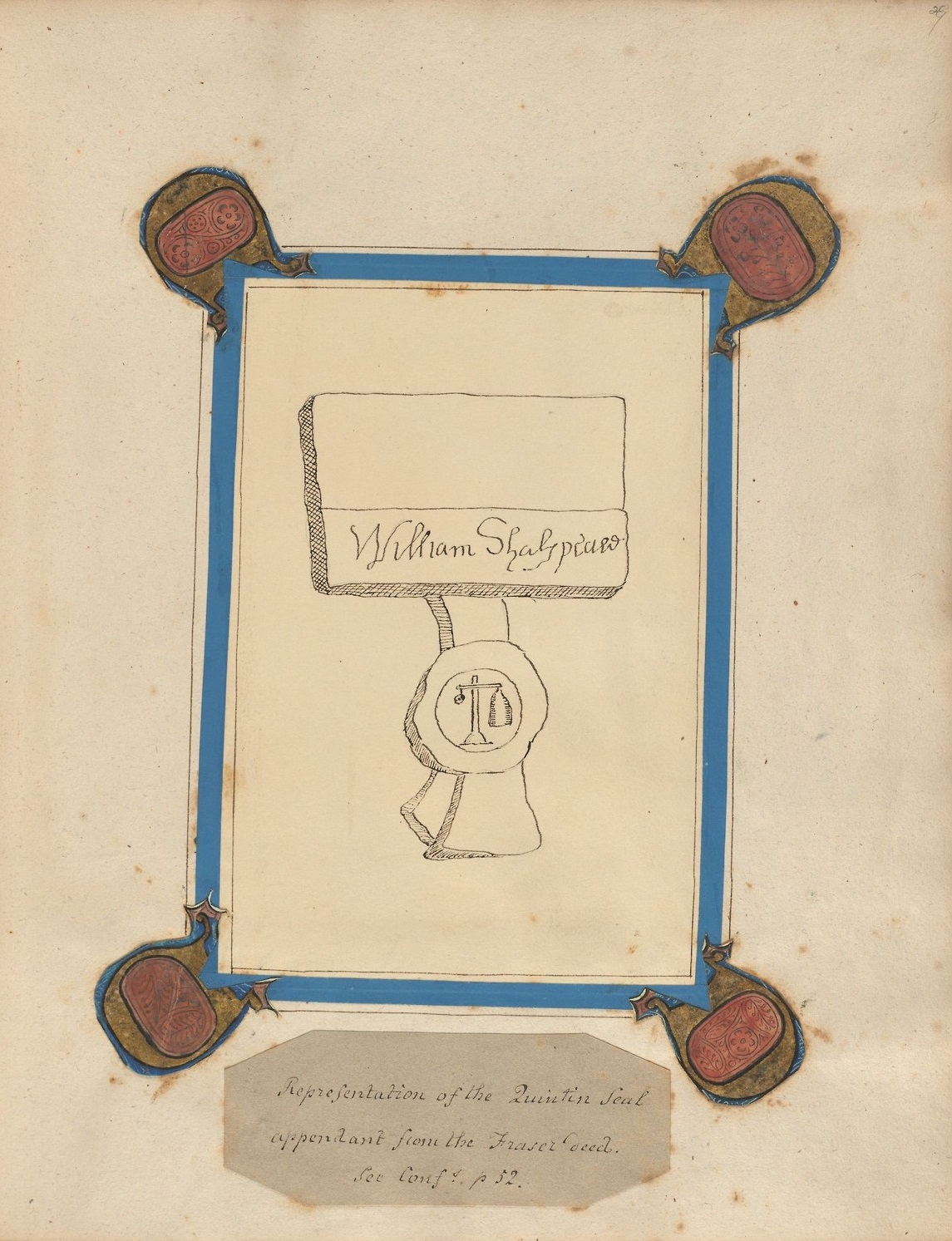
A forgery of Shakespeare's signature by Ireland, circa 1795

The Ireland Shakespeare forgeries were a cause célèbre in 1790s London, when author and engraver Samuel Ireland announced the discovery, by his son William Henry Ireland, of a treasure-trove of Shakespeare's manuscripts. Among them were the manuscripts of four plays, two of them previously unknown.

Upon the release of the manuscripts, such respected literary figures as James Boswell (biographer of Samuel Johnson) and poet laureate Henry James Pye pronounced them genuine, as did various antiquarian experts. Richard Brinsley Sheridan, the leading theatre manager of his day, agreed to present one of the newly discovered plays with John Philip Kemble in the starring role. Excitement over the biographical and literary significance of the find turned to acrimony, however, when it was charged that the documents were forgeries. Edmond Malone, widely regarded as the greatest Shakespeare scholar of his time, conclusively showed that the language, orthography, and handwriting were not those of the times and persons to which they were credited. William Henry Ireland, the supposed discoverer, then confessed to the fraud.

== Background ==
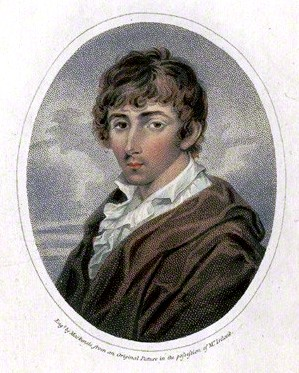
William Henry Ireland.

Although Shakespeare's works were readily available in versions both for the learned and for the general public, no satisfactory biography could be constructed. In spite of an intense search by would-be Shakespeare biographers from Nicholas Rowe to Edmond Malone, only scraps and legends turned up. There was an intense hope and expectation that some documents would surface to fill the gap.

Samuel Ireland was an eager collector of antique relics—his collection included a piece of Charles II's cloak, Oliver Cromwell's leather jacket, and Joseph Addison's fruit knife—as well as a Shakespeare enthusiast. While gathering material for a forthcoming book, Picturesque Tours of the Upper, or Warwickshire Avon, he passed through Stratford on Avon. By this time, Stratford had already begun capitalising on its status as Shakespeare's birthplace, prompting Ireland to make inquiries about the life of the dramatist. Although he had the satisfaction of being the first to introduce Shakespeare's crabtree and Anne Hathaway's cottage to the general public, Ireland found that official documentation of the bard eluded him.

Samuel's son, William Henry Ireland, had a fascination with forgery. He was heavily influenced by the novel Love and Madness by Herbert Croft, which contained lengthy passages on the forger Thomas Chatterton. William witnessed his father's frustration first-hand. One moment, in particular, struck him forcibly. Knowing that the furniture and papers from New Place, Shakespeare's last residence, had been moved to Clopton house when New Place was demolished, Samuel Ireland reasoned that Shakespearean manuscripts might well be found there. Upon visiting however, he was informed by the current tenant that all the old papers—many of them Shakespeare's—had recently been burned. Samuel Ireland's distress at this news made a strong impression on the young man—even though it later turned out that this story was nothing more than a joke at Ireland's expense. According to the younger Ireland's confessions, it was to please his father that he embarked on the career of literary forgery that would ultimately ruin them both.

== First documents ==
From a chance acquaintance met at a book-binder's the young man learned of a technique for simulating the appearance of ancient writing by using a special ink and then heating the paper. After a trial run creating a couple of relatively insignificant documents, he set out to devise something with Shakespeare's signature. His work at a legal firm gave him access to Elizabethan and Jacobean parchment deeds, so in December 1794 he cut a piece of parchment from one of them, used his special ink to write with and heated it over a candle. The result was a mortgage deed between Shakespeare and his fellow-actor John Heminges on one side, and Michael Fraser and his wife on the other. The text and signature he copied from the facsimile of the genuine 1612 mortgage deed printed in Malone's edition of Shakespeare. Ripping a seal from another early deed, young Ireland attached it to this concoction and presented the result to his father on 16 December. Samuel Ireland accepted it as authentic, and the next day took it to the Heralds' Office, which approved it as genuine.

Asked where he had turned up this deed, William Henry replied that he had found it in an old trunk belonging to a chance acquaintance who did not wish to have his name revealed. Mr. H., as he called him, had freely given him this deed. The young discoverer suggested that there might well be more documents where this had come from, and quickly followed this up with a promissory note from Shakespeare to Heminges—the only such note (had it been genuine) ever discovered from the period.

== Further forgeries ==
With his next discovery William Henry moved from mere forgery to original art. Having learned—apparently from a chance remark by one of his father's friends rather than by research—that Henry Wriothesley, 3rd Earl of Southampton had been Shakespeare's patron, he decided to create correspondence between them. "Doe notte esteeme me a sluggarde nor tardye for thus havyinge delayed to answerre or rather toe thank you for youre greate Bountye," he has Shakespeare write sans punctuation. "[G]ratitude is alle I have toe utter and that is tooe greate ande tooe sublyme a feeling for poore mortalls toe expresse O my Lord itte is a Budde which Bllossommes Bllooms butte never dyes." The Earl of Southampton replies in a similar vein, also sans punctuation, and with a similar spelling: “…as I have beene thye Freynde soe will I continue aughte thatte I canne doe forre thee praye commande me ande you shalle fynde mee Yours Southampton". To explain how both letters could end up together in the same collection William Henry added a note explaining that Shakespeare's was a "Copye" of the letter he sent. Samuel Ireland and his friends admired the style of the letters but not the earl's penmanship; William Henry, not knowing that handwriting of the earl was extant, had written Southampton's reply with his left hand.

A flood of documents now followed, all coming from Mr. H's ostensibly miraculous chest. Shakespeare's "Profession of Faith" proved he was a Protestant, a letter to fellow-actor Richard Cowley showed he was "a perfect good natured man", and a letter from Queen Elizabeth made it clear that he was favoured by the most powerful person in the land. A sketch of himself that accompanied his letter to Cowley showed that he was a wretched draftsman with an impenetrable sense of humour. Described in the letter as a "whysycalle conceyte", it was (as Malone put it) "most truly whimsical, being a miserable drawing of our poet done by himself with a pen, from Martin Droeshout's print of him engraved seven years after his death…." There were also theatrical receipts, contracts, a letter and poem to his future wife, "Anna Hatherrewaye", and even books from Shakespeare's library, complete with marginal annotations actually signed by the bard himself. Of most interest, however, were a manuscript of King Lear Shakespeare had prepared for the press, a few stray leaves of "Hamblette", and two previously unknown plays, Vortigern and Rowena and Henry II.

== Artifacts on display ==
From the moment of discovery Samuel Ireland invited friends in to see his new possessions. On 20 December 1794 Sir Frederick Eden, 2nd Baronet came to examine the seal on the Fraser lease. He announced that it represented a quintain, a device used in lance practice, and the conclusion was that Shakespeare had used it as a play on his own name. In February 1795 however he issued a general invitation to literary men to come to his house and examine them. The exhibition was a roaring success. Samuel Parr and Joseph Warton on hearing Samuel Ireland read the "Profession of Faith" proclaimed it superior to anything in the English liturgy. James Boswell got down on his knees to kiss the relics. Scottish antiquarian George Chalmers and educator Richard Valpy visited frequently, and editor James Boaden, author Herbert Croft, and poet-laureate Henry James Pye (among others) testified publicly to their belief in the authenticity of the papers.

Shortly after this, Ireland turned his home exhibit into a museum, inviting members of the public to look at his artifacts in exchange for a fee. It was at this time a visitor noted that a document supposedly written by the Earl of Leicester was dated 1590, despite the nobleman having died in 1588. When Samuel Ireland confronted his son with this information, William Henry wanted to burn the document, but his father demurred. He suggested that the document might have been misdated at some later time, and the two agreed to tear off the date. The item was displayed, and subsequently printed, in this mutilated form. At least two scholars, antiquary Joseph Ritson and classicist Richard Porson, correctly recognised the documents as forgeries, and editor Henry Bate Dudley started lampooning the papers as early as 17 February 1795.

As Samuel Ireland did not invite the two greatest Shakespeare scholars of the day, Edmond Malone and George Steevens, to examine the manuscripts, suspicion was aroused. As one writer noted "The publick would certainly have been gratified to know, that these extraordinary MSS. had been deemed genuine by Dr. Farmer, Messrs. Stevens or Malone; whose literary characters might have served as letters of credence." Samuel Ireland later observed that he was "of a different sentiment with regard to the sanction, which his [Malone's] inspection would afford them." He did however attempt to get Richard Farmer to look at the papers without success.

The exhibition, which roused much public excitement, continued for more than a year. On 17 November Ireland and his son carried the papers to St James's Palace, where the Duke of Clarence and Dorothea Jordan examined them, and on 30 December Ireland submitted them to the Prince of Wales at Carlton House.

== Vortigern and Rowena ==
As early as 26 December 1794 William Henry had announced the existence of Shakespeare's unknown play Vortigern and Rowena, but it was not until March that he was able to present his father with the manuscript. It came with Shakespeare's correspondence with a printer purporting to explain why the play was unpublished. Both Richard Brinsley Sheridan of Drury Lane Theatre and Thomas Harris of Covent Garden expressed an interest in producing the play. Sheridan was the winner in this competition. Prompted by fears that a descendant of Shakespeare might surface to claim the rights to his productions, William Henry produced a deed to prove that one of his ancestors, coincidentally named William Henry Ireland, had saved Shakespeare from drowning, and that Shakespeare had rewarded him with all the newly discovered manuscripts.

== Publication of the MSS ==
Samuel Ireland announced the publication of the papers on 4 March 1795, and the volume itself appeared in December of that year. William Henry had bitterly opposed this move, but his father was determined. Included were such items as the "Profession of Faith," the letter from Queen Elizabeth, and the manuscript of King Lear. Henry II, Vortigern, and the marginalia were excluded from this volume.

Shortly after the appearance of the book Samuel Ireland's neighbour, Albany Wallis, who had discovered one of the few authentic signatures of Shakespeare, came up with a new and startling discovery. He had turned up a genuine John Heminges signature, and of course it looked nothing like the signatures William Henry had produced. When the forger learned of this problem, however, he soon produced Heminges signatures that resembled the authentic one. It seems, William Henry explained, that there were two actors named John Heminges active at the time—hence the dissimilar signatures.

The volume was not well received. The first reply was James Boaden's A Letter to George Steevens (16 January 1796). Boaden concentrated on the manuscript of Lear, observing that if this is Shakespeare's original, and the printed versions contaminated with alterations by the actors, then the players are "at once converted ... into the most elaborate and polished masters of versification, and Shakspeare into a writer without the necessary ear for rhythm—a man who produced a series of harmonious versification by chance, and lost the supreme ascendancy in his art, from the not being able to number ten syllables upon his fingers." He also took aim at the spelling. Samuel Ireland's friends and supporters raced in with replies. Colonel Francis Webb, writing under the name "Philalethes," argued that as the paper was old the documents must have belonged to Shakespeare's time; there would have been no reason to forge them then; therefore they must be genuine. Matthew Wyatt took potshots at Boaden by contrasting his views as a believer with those after his conversion. Walley Chamberlain Oulton maintained that the papers were so voluminous that forgery was out of the question. He expressed a hope that Vortigern would turn out to be genuine, as it might well revitalise contemporary drama. He looked to the judgment of the audience for the play's vindication.

== Exposure ==
Two crushing blows came quickly. The first was the publication of Malone's volume of over four hundred pages on 31 March 1796. Exposing the forgeries in detail, he showed one by one that each document was flawed in its handwriting, its language, its orthography, and its history. The spelling of the documents was not only not that of Shakespeare's time, it was that of no time whatsoever. Numerous historical inaccuracies—not least of which was the reference to the Globe before that playhouse had been built—exposed the forger's ignorance. The handwriting of the Queen and Southampton did not at all resemble authentic examples. Words appearing in the forgeries (upset, for example) were not used in Shakespeare's time, or were used in a different sense than that of the papers.

The second blow came two days later, on 2 April, with the failure of Vortigern at Drury Lane Theatre. The excitement was intense and the crowd volatile; tickets had sold out early and seats were hard to come by. While at first the play seemed to be a success with the audience, soon fits of laughter were heard and at one point the play came to a complete halt till order was restored. When Barrymore announced another performance of the play, the audience rebelled, and chaos reigned until the management substituted something else. William Henry Ireland blamed the actors, particularly Kemble, along with a "Malone faction," for the failure of his play. Others attributed it to the quality of the play itself. Vortigern's opening night was also its final performance.

== Aftermath ==
For the Irelands, father and son, the failure of the play, coupled with Malone's exposure of the hoax, was an unmitigated disaster. Samuel Ireland still believed the papers to be Shakespeare's, and refused to listen to anything his son had to say. William Henry confessed the forgery to his sisters, to his mother, and to Albany Wallis, but his father did not believe his story. The public, not surprisingly, accused Samuel Ireland of the fraud. Sales of his books suffered.

Blaming Malone for his misfortunes, Samuel Ireland set out to write a book that would destroy the scholar's reputation. With the aid of Thomas Caldecott he attacked Malone for using forensic techniques like handwriting comparison to settle a literary question, rather than relying on taste and aesthetic sensibilities. Concerned for his father's reputation William Henry rushed into print with a pamphlet confessing to the forgeries, and his father replied immediately with a vindication of his conduct in the whole affair. This combination roused suspicions. George Steevens accused the two of collusion:

The hopeful youth takes on himself the guilt of the entire forgery, and strains hard to exculpate his worthy father from the slightest participation in it. The father, on the contrary, declares that his son had not sufficient abilities for the execution of so difficult a task. Between them, in short, there is a pretended quarrel, that they may not look as if they were acting in concert on the present occasion.

The charge would stick. George Chalmers' Apology for the Believers and Samuel Ireland's Investigation concentrated on attacking Malone rather than exonerating Samuel, and the public verdict was probably summed up in a print by John Nixon depicting the entire Ireland family engaged in forging the papers.

The culpability of Samuel Ireland remained a controversial topic for years to come. Although the son's Confessions (1805) did a great deal to establish the father's innocence, not everybody was convinced. Accounts by Clement Mansfield Ingleby in 1859 and George Dawson in 1888 took the position that the father was responsible for the forgeries and the son's Confession was a tissue of lies. The acquisition of Samuel Ireland's papers by the British Museum in 1876, however, provided a wealth of evidence that Samuel was the victim rather than the perpetrator of the fraud, and Ingleby changed his position in his 1881 paper on the Ireland Affair.

== Legacy ==
After Samuel Ireland's death in 1800, the original forgeries, bound in three folio volumes, were sold to John "Dog" Dent, MP and bibliophile. The collections passed through several hands before being acquired by Mary Morley Crapo Hyde (1912–2003) and her first husband, Donald Hyde (1909–1966). She left the volumes to Harvard's Houghton Library after her death.

British writer Peter Ackroyd provides an imaginative account of the Irelands' forgeries in his novel The Lambs of London published by Chatto & Windus in 2004. In the same year, BBC Radio 4 broadcast Martyn Wade's play about the forgeries, Another Shakespeare.

== Examples of Ireland Shakespeare forgeries ==
Images of forged signatures and notes of William Shakespeare in The courtier of Counte Baldessar Castilio Diuided into foure bookes. Verie necessarie and profitable for young gentlemen and gentlewomen, abiding in court, palace, or place. Translated into English by Tho. Hobby., London : Printed by Thomas Creede, 1603.

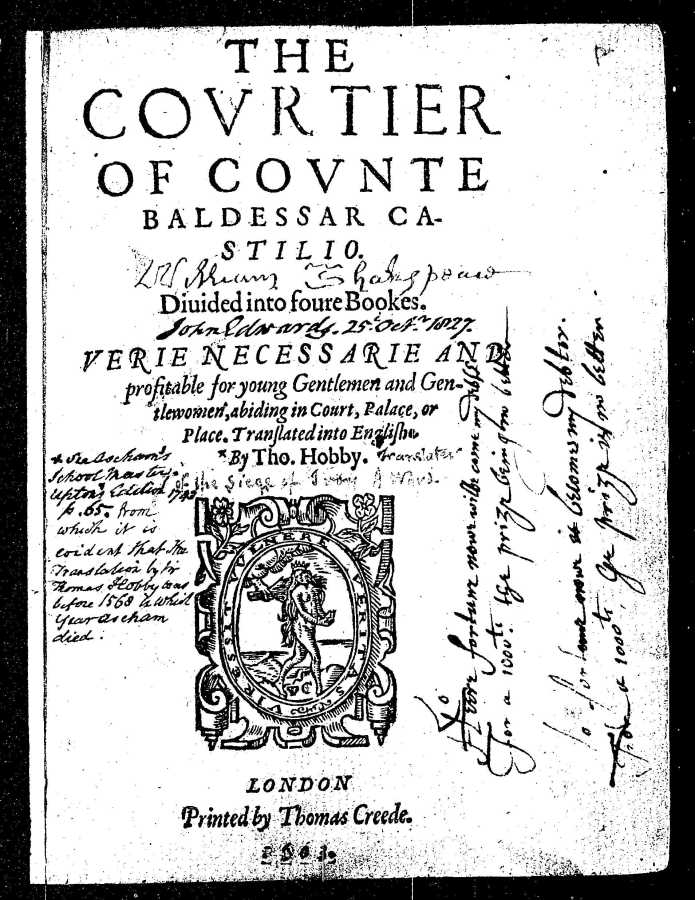
Title page

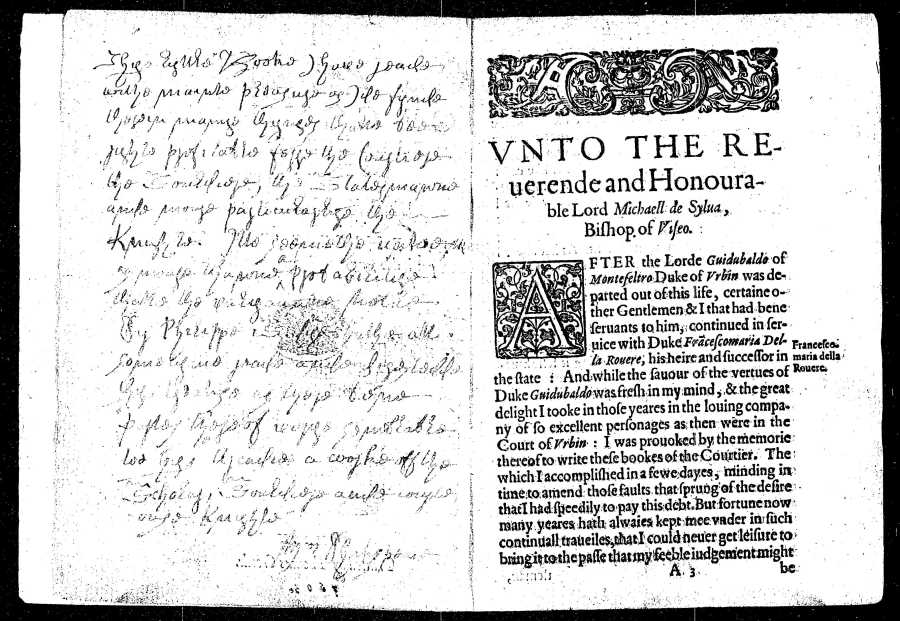
Title page, verso

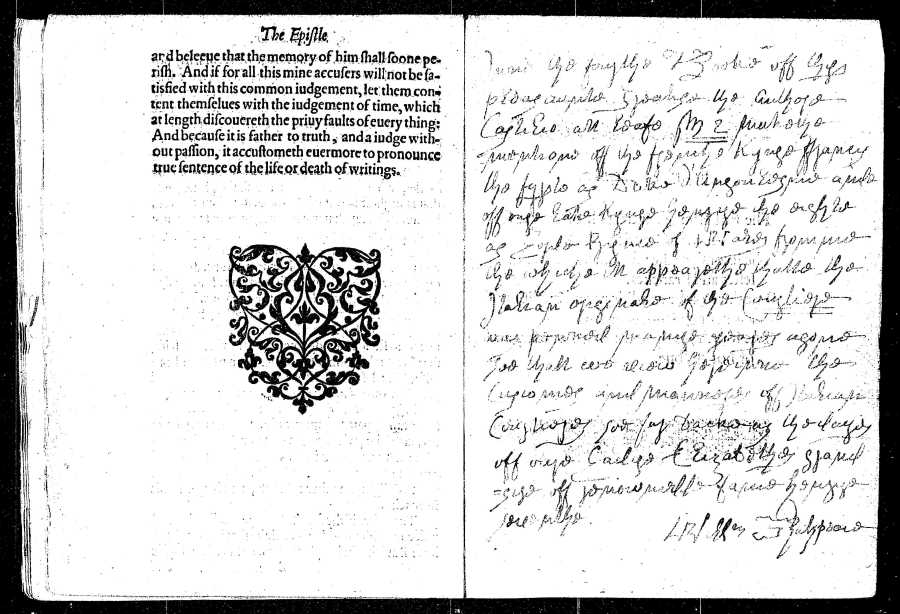
Page B4

== See also ==
- Hitler Diaries
- James Maybrick#Jack the Ripper diary
- Literary forgery
- Shakespeare authorship question

== Notes ==
In the following DNB refers to Sidney Lee, "Samuel Ireland" in Dictionary of National Biography, London, 1892, volume 29, pp. 31–36.
