= William Henry Ireland =

English Shakespearean forger (1775–1835)

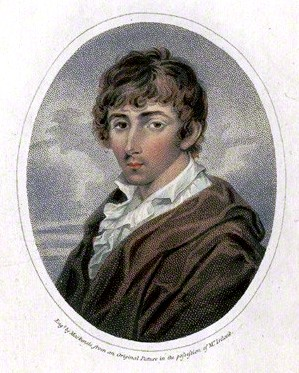
- William Henry Ireland (1818)
- Born: 2 August 1775; London
- Died: 17 April 1835 (aged 59); Sussex Place, St George's-in-the-Fields, London
- Occupations: clerk, writer, illustrator
- Known for: Ireland Shakespeare forgeries
- Notable work: Vortigern and Rowena
- Spouses: Alice Crudge (4 July 1796–her death); unknown Ireland, née Bayly, née Pepper (1804–?)
- Children: 2
- Parents: Samuel Ireland (father); Anna Maria de Burgh Coppinger (mother)

William Henry Ireland (1775–1835) was an English forger of would-be Shakespearean documents and plays. He is less well known as a poet, writer of gothic novels and histories. Although he was apparently christened William-Henry, he was known as Samuel through much of his life (apparently after a brother who died in childhood), and many sources list his name as Samuel William Henry Ireland.

== Early life ==
Although Ireland claimed throughout his life that he was born in London in 1777, the Ireland family Bible puts his birth two years earlier, on 2 August 1775. His father, Samuel Ireland, was a successful publisher of travelogues, collector of antiquities and collector of Shakespearian plays and "relics". There was at the time, and still is, a great scarcity of writing in the hand of Shakespeare. Of his 37 plays, there is not one copy in his own writing, not a scrap of correspondence from Shakespeare to a friend, fellow writer, patron, producer or publisher. Forgery would fill this void.

William Henry also became a collector of books. In many later recollections Ireland described his fascination with the works and the glorious death of the forger Thomas Chatterton, and probably knew the Ossian poems of James Macpherson. He was strongly influenced by the 1780 novel Love and Madness by Herbert Croft, which was often read aloud in the Ireland house, and which contained large sections on Chatterton and Macpherson. When he was apprenticed to a mortgage lawyer, Ireland began to experiment with blank, genuinely old papers and forged signatures on them. Eventually he forged several documents until he was ready to present them to his father.

== First forgeries ==
In December 1794 William told his father that he had discovered a cache of old documents belonging to an acquaintance who wanted to remain unnamed, and that one of them was a deed with a signature of Shakespeare in it. He gave the document—which he had of course made himself—to his overjoyed father, who had been looking for just that kind of signature for years.

Ireland first forged a letter, that he claimed was written by Shakespeare expressing gratitude towards the Earl of Southampton for his patronage.

Ireland went on to make more findings—a promissory note, a written declaration of Protestant faith, letters to Anne Hathaway (with a lock of hair attached), and to Queen Elizabeth—all supposedly in Shakespeare's hand. He claimed that all came from the chest of the anonymous friend. He "found" books with Shakespeare's notes in the margins and "original" manuscripts for Hamlet and King Lear. The experts of the day authenticated them all.

On 24 December 1795, Samuel Ireland published his own book about the papers, a lavishly illustrated and expensively produced set of facsimiles and transcriptions of the papers called Miscellaneous Papers and Legal Instruments under the Hand and Seal of William Shakespeare (the book bears the publication date 1796). More people took interest in the matter and the plot began to unravel.

== "This solemn mockery" ==
In 1795, Ireland became bolder and produced a whole new play, allegedly written by Shakespeare, entitled Vortigern and Rowena. After extensive negotiations, Irish playwright Richard Brinsley Sheridan acquired rights for the first production of the play at London's Drury Lane Theatre for £300, and a promise of half of all profits to the Irelands.

Sheridan read the play and noticed it was relatively simplistic compared to Shakespeare's other works. John Philip Kemble, actor and manager of Drury Lane Theatre, later claimed he had serious doubts about its authenticity; he also suggested that the play appear on April Fool's Day, though Samuel Ireland objected, and the play was moved to the next day.

Although the Shakespeare papers had prominent believers (including James Boswell), sceptics had questioned their authenticity from the beginning, and as the premiere of Vortigern approached, the press was filled with arguments over whether the papers were genuine or forgeries. On 31 March 1796, Shakespearean scholar Edmond Malone published his own exhaustive study, An Inquiry into the Authenticity of Certain Miscellaneous Papers and Legal Instruments, about the supposed papers. His attack on the papers, stretching to more than 400 densely printed pages, showed convincingly that the papers were nothing other than modern forgeries. Although believers tried to hold their ground, scholars were convinced by Malone's arguments.

Vortigern and Rowena opened on 2 April 1796, just two days after Malone's book appeared. Contemporary accounts differ in details, but most agree the first three acts went smoothly, and the audience listened respectfully. Late in the play, though, Kemble used the chance to hint at his opinion by repeating Vortigern's line "and when this solemn mockery is o'er." Malone's supporters had filled the theatre, and the play was greeted with the audience's catcalls. The play had only one performance, and was not revived until 2008.

== Forgeries exposed ==
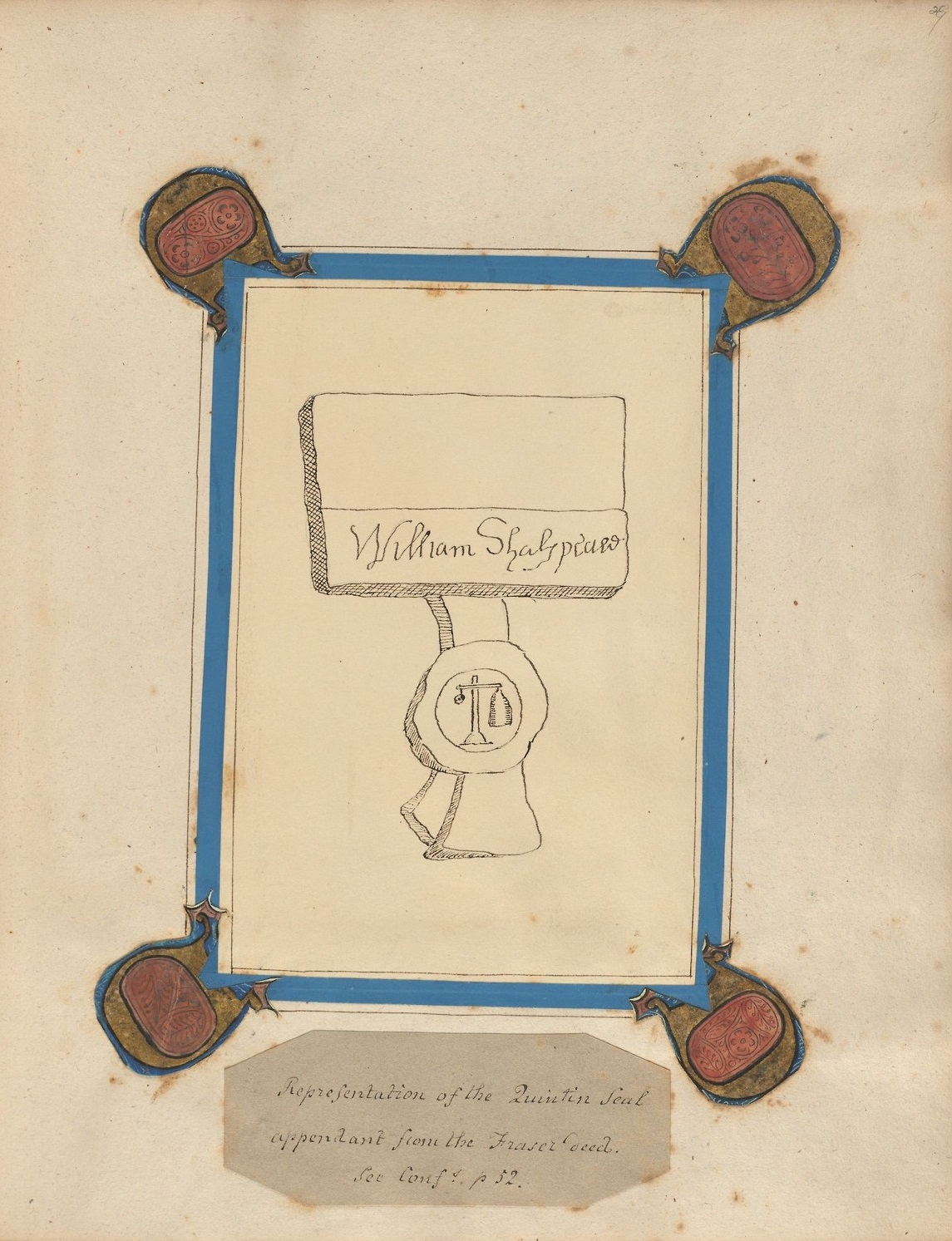
A forgery of Shakespeare's signature by Ireland, c. 1795

When critics closed in and accused Samuel Ireland of forgery, his son published a confession—An Authentic Account of the Shaksperian Manuscripts—but many critics could not believe a young man could have forged them all by himself. One paper published a caricature in which William Henry is awed by the findings when the rest of the family forges more of them (as opposed to what was really going on). Samuel Ireland's reputation did not recover before his death in 1800.

In 1805 William Henry published The Confessions of William Henry Ireland, but confession did not help his reputation. He took on a number of miscellaneous jobs as a hack writer, but always found himself short of money. In 1814 he moved to France and worked in the French national library, continuing to publish books in London all the while. When he returned in 1823, he resumed his life of penury. In 1832 he published his own edition of Vortigern and Rowena (his father had originally published it in 1799) as his own play with very little success.

There has been recent scholarly interest in his later Gothic novels and his poetry. His illustrated Histories were popular, so to say that Ireland died in obscurity is probably not correct. He was, however, perpetually impoverished; he spent time in debtors' prison, and was constantly forced to borrow money from friends and strangers. When he died, his widow and daughters applied to the Literary Fund for relief. They received only token amounts.

Ireland is one of the main characters in Peter Ackroyd's 2004 novel The Lambs of London, though the contacts with Charles and Mary Lamb have no basis in the historical record, and Ackroyd took many liberties with the story.

== Bibliography ==
- An Authentic Account of the Shaksperian Manuscripts (1796)
- The Abbess: A Romance (4 volumes), 1799. (Gothic novel. reprinted in 1975, Ayer. ISBN 0-405-18670-3)
- Rimualdo: Or, The Castle of Badajos, 1800. (Gothic novel. Reprinted in 2005, (Jeffrey Kahan, editor), Zittaw Press ISBN 0-9767212-1-X)
- Gondez the Monk: A Romance of the Thirteenth Century 1805. (Gothic, reprinted in 2005, (Jeffrey Kahan, editor), Zittaw Press ISBN 0-9753395-8-3)
- The Confessions of William Henry Ireland (1805)
- Scribbleomania: or the Printer's Devil's Polichronicon: a Sublime Poem, 1815. (Page images at Google Books)
- Henry Fielding's Proverbs 1822
- Memoirs of Jeanne d'Arc, surnamed La Pucelle d'Orleans, 1824 (two volumes). (Page images at Google Books: Volume 1 and Volume 2) a translation of Voltaire's Pucelle
- A New and Complete History of the County of Kent (4 volumes), 1829–31. (Page images at Google Books: Volume 2, Volume 3, Volume 4; reprinted 1919, London: Virtue)
- Vortigern: an Historical Play, with an Original Preface, 1832, London: Joseph Thomas.
- Ireland's History of the Isle of Grain, 18xx. (Reprinted in 2002, Local History Publications. ISBN 1-85699-213-6)
- A New and Complete History of the Isle of Thanet ISBN 1-905477-10-4
- Ireland's History of Woolwich ISBN 1-85699-202-0
- Ireland's History of Chislehurst ISBN 1-85699-197-0
- Ireland's History of Gravesend ISBN 1-85699-211-X

== Sources ==
- Baines, Paul (2011) [2004]. "Ireland, William Henry (1775–1835)". Oxford Dictionary of National Biography (online ed.). Oxford University Press. doi:10.1093/ref:odnb/14451. (Subscription, Wikipedia Library access or UK public library membership required.)
- Collins, Paul (2001). Banvard's Folly: Thirteen Tales of Renowned Obscurity, Famous Anonymity and Rotten Luck. Picador. ISBN 978-0330486880.
- Schoenbaum, Samuel (1981). "Shakespeare Forgeries: Ireland and Collier". In Schoenbaum, Samuel (ed.). William Shakespeare: Records and Images. London: Scolar Press. pp. 117–54. ISBN 978-0195202342.
- Winterbotham, Alex (20 November 2008). "Vortigern". Varsity.
