= Wiveton =

Village in Norfolk, England

Coordinates: 52.94427°N 1.03909°E

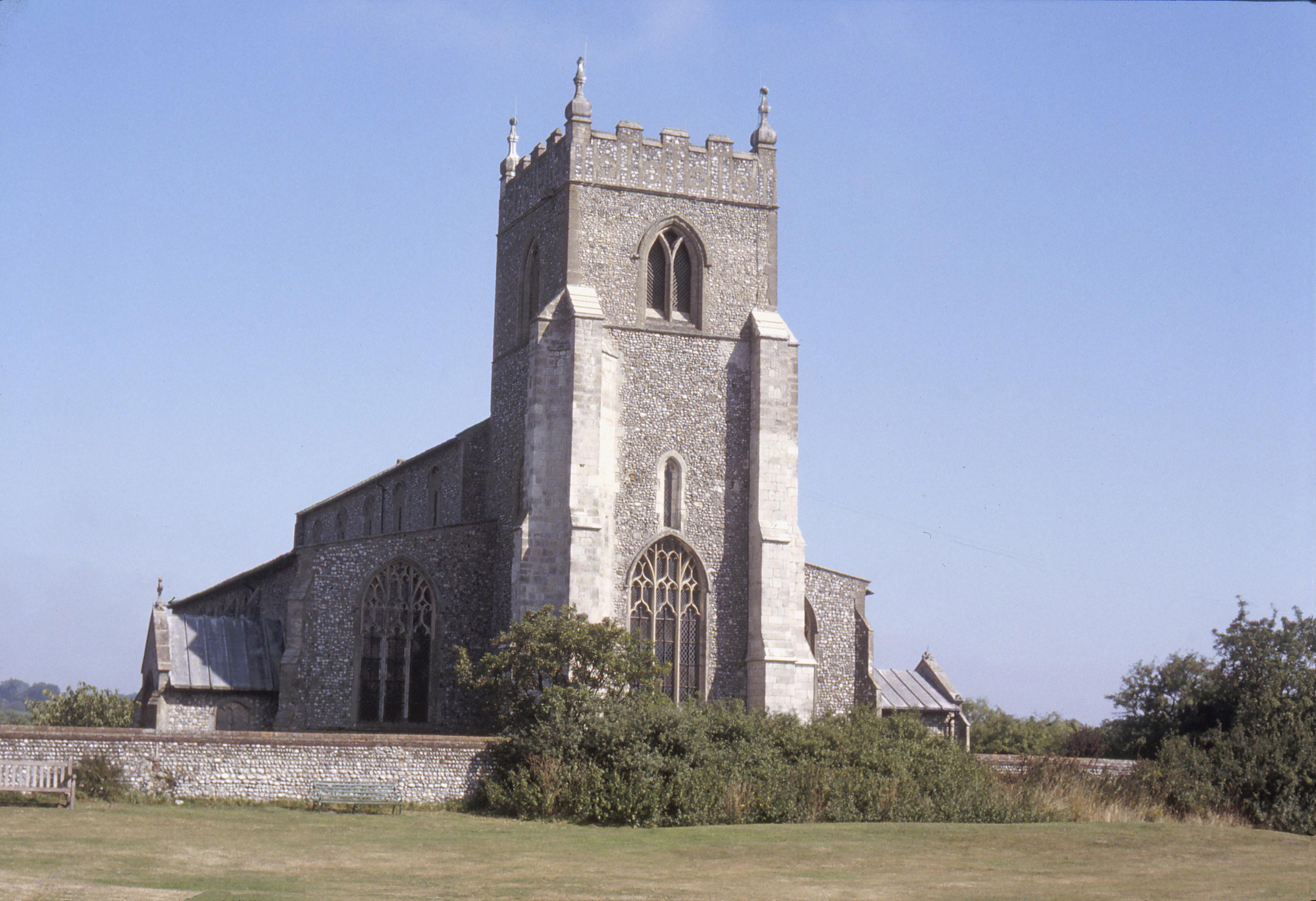
- Wiveton church, Norfolk, in 1981

- Location within Norfolk
- Area: 4.25 km^{2} (1.64 sq mi)
- Population: 127 (2011)
  - Density: 30/km^{2} (78/sq mi)
- OS grid reference: TG042428
- Civil parish: Wiveton
- District: North Norfolk
- Shire county: Norfolk
- Region: East
- Country: England
- Sovereign state: United Kingdom
- Post town: HOLT
- Postcode district: NR25
- Police: Norfolk
- Fire: Norfolk
- Ambulance: East of England

Wiveton is a village and civil parish in the English county of Norfolk. It is situated on the west bank of the River Glaven, 3 km (1.9 mi) inland from the coast and directly across the river from the village of Cley next the Sea. The larger village of Blakeney is 2 km (1.2 mi) to the west, the town of Cromer is 20 km (12 mi) to the east, and the city of Norwich is 40 km (25 mi) to the south-east.

The civil parish has an area of 4.25 km^{2} (1.64 sq mi) and in the 2001 census had a population of 158 in 74 households, the population reducing to 127 at the 2011 census. For the purposes of local government, the parish falls within the district of North Norfolk.

== Correct pronunciation ==
"Wifton"; "Wiveton - locally Wifton"

== History ==
The villages name origin is uncertain. 'Wife's farm/settlement' or 'women's farm/settlement'.

Until the 17th century, the River Glaven was navigable and Wiveton was a port. The outline of the former harbour can still be seen in the fields between Wiveton and Cley. Alongside this, marks from mooring ropes belonging to large transport barges can still be seen etched into the wall on the east side of the church. Wiveton was in the national news in 1779 when James Hackman, its newly appointed rector, was hanged for the murder of Martha Ray, mistress of John Montagu, 4th Earl of Sandwich.

Wiveton church has a memorial to Royal Geographical Society Gold Medal Winner Lt. Colonel Frederick Marshman Bailey, one of the heroes of 'The Great Game'. Inside the church there is the joint memorial to Anne Fleming and Catherine Jennis.

A series of archaeological test pits were dug around the settlement between 2006 and 2008. The report was published in 2018.
