= General Croft =

General Croft may refer to:

- Andrew A. Croft (born 1965), U.S. Air Force lieutenant general
- John R. Croft (fl. 1970s–2000s), U.S. Air National Guard brigadier general
- William Denman Croft (1879–1968), British Army brigadier general

== See also ==
- James Crofts (British Army officer) (c. 1683–1732), British Army major general
