= Robert Montagu (Royal Navy officer) =

Royal Navy Admiral (1763–1830)

Admiral Robert Montagu
- Born: 1763
- Died: 27 November 1830 (aged 66–67); Cheltenham
- Military career
- Allegiance: United Kingdom
- Branch: Royal Navy
- Rank: Admiral
- Commands: HMS Seahorse; HMS Exeter; HMS Flora; HMS Aquilon; HMS Sampson; HMS Hector; HMS Cumberland; Jamaica Station
- Conflicts: American Revolutionary War: Battle of Sadras; Battle of Providien; Battle of Negapatam; Battle of Trincomalee; Siege of Cuddalore; French Revolutionary War: Battle of the Hyères Islands; Napoleonic Wars

Admiral Robert Montagu (1763 – 27 November 1830) was a Royal Navy officer who became Commander-in-Chief of the Jamaica Station.

== Naval career ==
Born the son of John Montagu, 4th Earl of Sandwich and Martha Ray, Robert Montagu joined the Royal Navy some time prior to 1778, at which point he was serving as a lieutenant in the 74-gun ship of the line HMS Superb, the flagship of Vice-Admiral Sir Edward Hughes on the East Indies Station. Towards the start of 1781 the captain of the 24-gun frigate HMS Seahorse, also on the station, died. Hughes chose Montagu to succeed him in Superbe, and Montagu was promoted to captain on 3 March.

He saw action at the Battle of Sadras in February 1782 during the Anglo-French War and again at the Battle of Providien in April 1782 during the American Revolutionary War. He transferred to the command of the third-rate HMS Exeter in May 1782 in which he saw action at the Battle of Negapatam in July 1782, the Battle of Trincomalee in September 1782 and the Siege of Cuddalore in June 1783. He went on to serve as Commander-in-Chief of the Jamaica Station in 1802. He died in Cheltenham in 1830.

== Citations ==
Military offices
Preceded by Lord Hugh Seymour	Commander-in-Chief, Jamaica Station; 1802	Succeeded by Sir John Duckworth
