= John Crofts (disambiguation) =

John Crofts was a politician.

John Crofts may also refer to:

- John Crofts (died 1628), MP for Thetford (UK Parliament constituency)
- John Crofts (priest), Dean of Norwich

== See also ==
- John Croft (disambiguation)
