= Love and Madness =

1780 novel by Sir Herbert Croft, 5th Baronet

Love and Madness is a 1780 English novel by Sir Herbert Croft. It was based on the 1779 murder of Martha Ray, the mistress of Lord Sandwich, by James Hackman. Its full title is Love and Madness, a Story too True: in a Series of Letters between Parties Whose Names Would Perhaps be Mentioned Were They Less Known or Lamented. The work proved very successful with many people initially believing that the fictional letters between the participants it contained were genuine.

A large part of the book was devoted to forgery, with two forgers, James Macpherson and Thomas Chatterton, featuring prominently. The novel was apparently a major influence on William Henry Ireland, the author of the Shakespeare Forgeries, who used the subplot about forgery as an inspiration. Ireland was himself reported to be an illegitimate son of Lord Sandwich by another mistress.

== Publication history ==
An amended edition of this novel appeared in the spring of 1780 by publisher George Kearsley in a campaign to promote the novel.

== Reception ==
The Morning Post initially received the letters well, and considered them instructive and inoffensive and painted a colourful picture of 'the dreadful consequences of the passion of love, unrestrained by virtue [...] which fill the mind at once both with horror and pity'.

== Bibliography ==
- Levy, Martin. Love and Madness: Murder of Martha Ray, Mistress of the Fourth Earl of Sandwich. Perennial, 2005.
- Pierce, Patricia. The Great Shakespeare Fraud: The Strange, True Story of William Henry-Ireland. Sutton Publishing, 2005.
- Brewer, John. Sentimental Murder : Love and Madness in the Eighteenth Century. London: Harper Perennial, 2005, p. 152. ISBN 0-00-655200-5.
- London Evening Post. Cited in: Sentimental Murder : Love and Madness in the Eighteenth Century. London: Harper Perennial. p. 155.
