= Samuel Ireland =

English author and engraver (21 May 1744–July 1800)

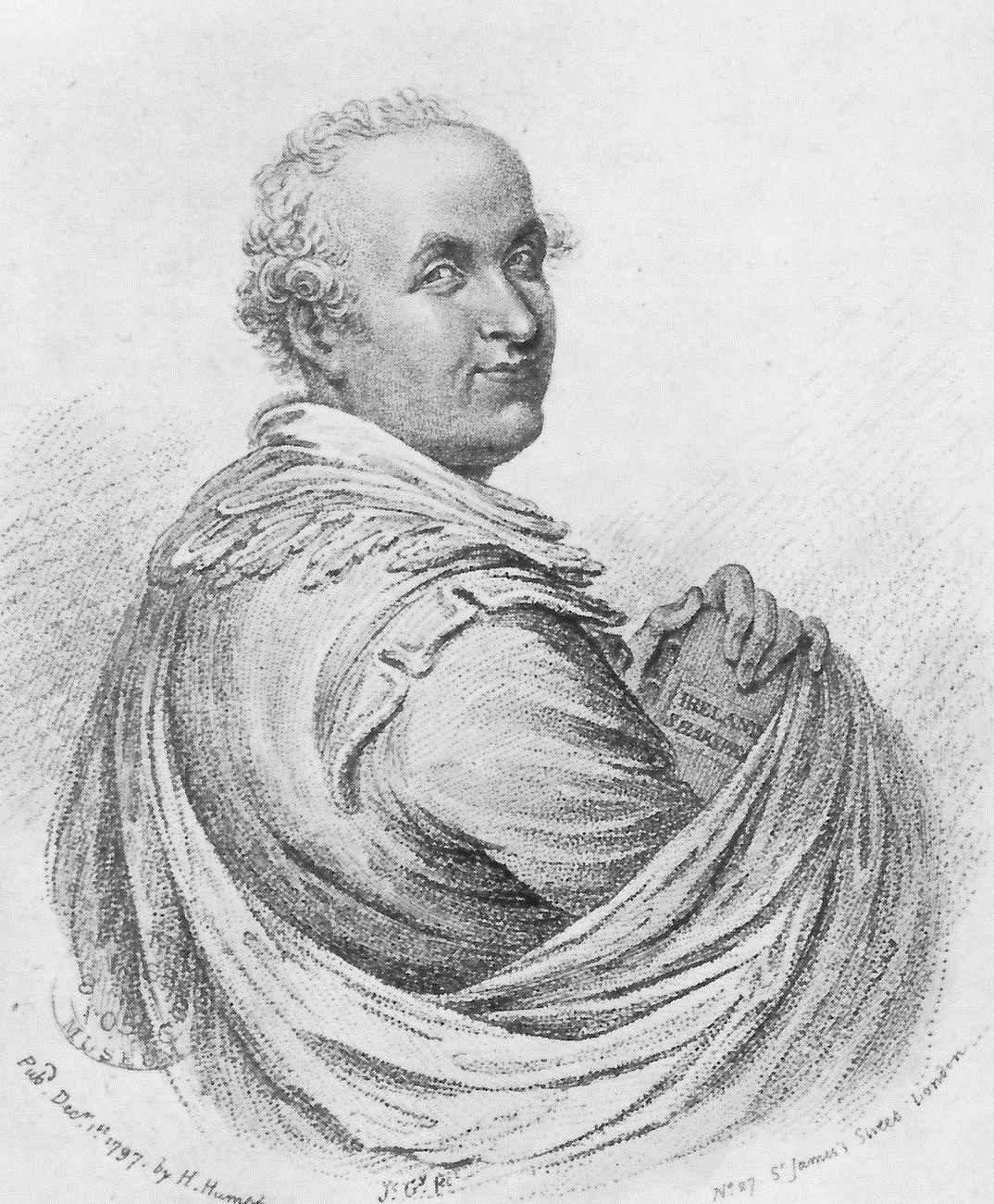
Caricature of Samuel Ireland

Samuel Ireland (21 May 1744 – July 1800) was an English author and engraver best known as the chief victim of the Ireland Shakespeare forgeries created by his son, William Henry Ireland.

== Early life ==
He began life as a weaver in Spitalfields, London, but soon took to dealing in prints and drawings and devoted his spare time to teaching himself drawing, etching, and engraving. He made sufficient progress to obtain a medal from the Society of Arts in 1760. In 1784 he appears as an exhibitor for the first and apparently only time at the Royal Academy, sending a view of Oxford. Between 1780 and 1785 he etched many plates after John Hamilton Mortimer and Hogarth. Etched portraits by him of General Oglethorpe (1785) and Thomas Inglefield, an armless artist (1787), are in the print room of the British Museum, together with etchings after Ruisdael (1786) and Teniers (1787) and other masters, and some architectural drawings in water-colour.

Meanwhile, Ireland's taste for collecting books, pictures, and curiosities gradually became an all-absorbing passion. In 1794 he proved the value of part of his collection by issuing "Graphic Illustrations of Hogarth, from Pictures, Drawings, and Scarce Prints in the Author's Possession." Some of the plates were etched by himself. A second volume appeared in 1799. The work is of high interest, although it is possible that Ireland has assigned to Hogarth some drawings by other artists.

== Picturesque views ==
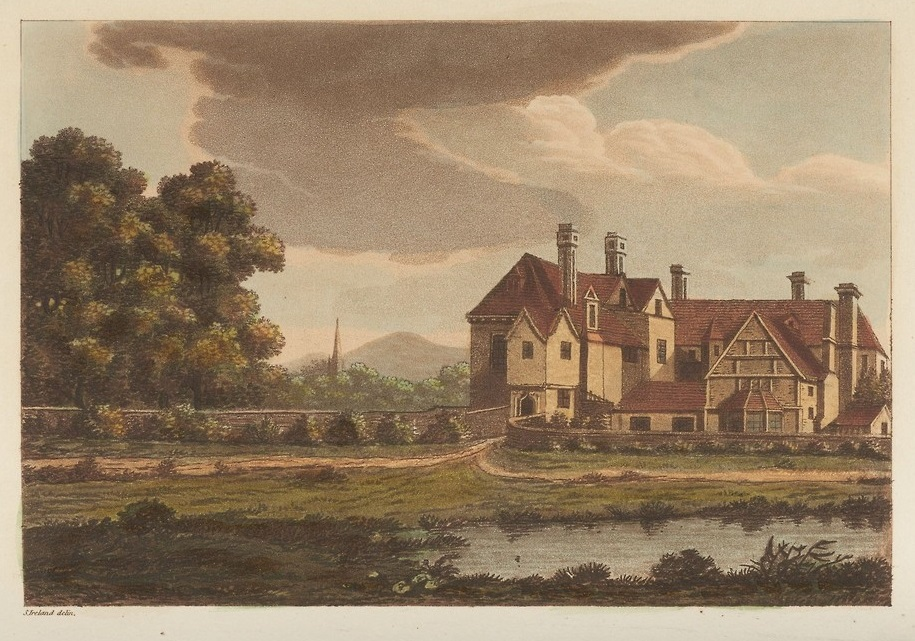
Cloptan House, from Picturesque Views on the Warwickshire Avon, 1795

In 1790 Ireland published A Picturesque Tour through Holland, Brabant, and part of France made in the Autumn of 1789, London (2 vols. Roy. 8vo and in large-paper 4to). It was dedicated to Francis Grose and contained etchings on copper in aquatint from drawings made by the author "on the spot." He paid at least one visit to France, and the charge brought against him by his enemies that he was never out of England is unfounded. A second edition appeared in 1795. The series, which was long valued by collectors, was continued in the same form in Picturesque Views on the River Thames, 1792 (2 vols., 2nd ed. 1800–1801); in Picturesque Views on the River Medway, 1793 (1 vol.); in Picturesque Views on the Warwickshire Avon, 1795 (1 vol.); and in Picturesque Views on the River Wye, 1797 (1 vol.). In 1800, just after Ireland's death, appeared Picturesque Views, with an Historical Account of the Inns of Court in London and Westminster, and the series was concluded by the publication in 1824 of Picturesque Views on the River Severn (2 vols.), with colored lithographs, after drawings by Ireland, and descriptions by T. Harral. Ireland had announced the immediate issue of this work in his volume on the Wye in 1797.

In 1790 Ireland resided in Arundel Street, off the Strand, and a year later removed to 8 Norfolk Street. His household consisted of Mrs Freeman, a housekeeper and amanuensis, whose handwriting shows her to have been a woman of education, a son William Henry, and a daughter Jane. The latter painted some clever miniatures. Ireland also had a married daughter, Anna Maria Barnard. The family Bible shows that all three children were illegitimate and that Mrs Freeman was their mother. Her original name was Anna Maria de Burgh Coppinger.

== Enthusiasm for Shakespeare ==
Ireland was a fervent admirer of William Shakespeare, and in 1793, when preparing his "Picturesque Views of the Avon," he took his son with him to Stratford-upon-Avon, to examine carefully all the sights associated with the dramatist. The father recorded many local traditions, which he accepted as true, including those concocted for his benefit (according to Sidney Lee) by John Jordan, a Stratford poet, who was his chief guide throughout his visit.

In his pursuit of information about Shakespeare, Ireland learned from some of the oldest inhabitants that manuscripts had been moved from Shakespeare's residence at New Place to Clopton House at the time of the Stratford fire. To Clopton House he went, where he learned from the tenant that the manuscripts he was seeking had been destroyed only a week before. His disappointment was extreme. "My God! Sir, you are not aware of the loss which the world has sustained. Would to heaven I had arrived sooner!".

== Forgeries ==
Late in 1794 his son, William Henry, claimed to have discovered a mortgage deed signed by Shakespeare, in an old trunk belonging to a mysterious acquaintance of his, whom he designated only as Mr. H. In fact he had forged the deed himself, using blank parchment cut from an ancient deed at his employer's office. Prominent authorities pronounced it genuine, and soon other items followed – a letter from Queen Elizabeth, a love-poem by Shakespeare written to his future wife, "Anna Hatherreway", the original manuscript of King Lear, and the manuscript of an otherwise unknown play, Vortigern and Rowena.

These were soon on display at Ireland's house, where notable literary men such as James Boswell, Samuel Parr, Joseph Warton, and Henry James Pye, the poet laureate, pronounced them genuine. The chief Shakespearean scholars of the day, Edmond Malone and George Steevens, however, unhesitatingly denounced them as forgeries. (One curious exception was George Chalmers, who made genuine contributions to Shakespeare scholarship, but who was nonetheless taken in by the imposition.)

Samuel Ireland, however, had no doubts about their genuineness, and published them in a folio volume in December 1795. Exposure quickly followed. James Boaden, formerly a believer, responded with "A Letter to George Steevens", published in January 1796, that attacked their authenticity, but the decisive blow was delivered by Edmond Malone's response, An Enquiry into the Authenticity of Certain Papers and Legal Instruments, published in March 1796. The failure of Vortigern and Rowena on its first performance quickly followed on 2 April 1796.

== Final years ==
Ireland never recovered from these disappointments. Although his son admitted to the hoax in his Authentic Account (1796), many blamed the father. He published in November 1796 A Vindication of His Conduct, defending himself from charges of having willfully deceived the public, and with the help of Thomas Caldecott attacked Malone, whom he saw as his chief enemy, in An Investigation of Mr. Malone's Claim to the Character of Scholar and Critic. On 29 October 1796 he was ridiculed on stage at Covent Garden as Sir Bamber Blackletter in Frederick Reynolds Fortune's Fool. When in 1797 he published his Picturesque Tour on the Wye, its chilling reception and the pecuniary loss to which it led proved how low his reputation had fallen. George Chalmers's learned Apology for the Believers in the Shakesperian Papers with its Supplemental Apology (1797), mainly attacked Malone, made little reference to the papers, and failed to restore Ireland's credit. In 1799 he had the hardihood to publish both Vortigern and Henry II, whose copyrights his son gave him before leaving home, and made vain efforts to get the latter represented on the stage. Obloquy still pursued him, and more than once he considered legal proceedings against his detractors. He died in July 1800 and Dr Latham, who attended him, recorded a deathbed declaration "that he was totally ignorant of the deceit, and was equally a believer in the authenticity of the manuscripts as those who were the most credulous." He was never reconciled to his son. His old books and curiosities were sold by auction in London on 7–15 May 1801. The original forgeries and many rare Shakespeare editions were described in the printed catalogue. His correspondence on the forgeries was purchased by the British Museum in 1877.

== Works ==
- A Picturesque Tour through Holland, Brabant, and part of France made in the Autumn of 1789, London, 1790 Volume 1 at Google; Volume 2 at Google
- Picturesque Views on the River Thames, 1792, 2 vols., 2nd ed. 1800–1801. volume 1 and volume 2 at Google
- Picturesque Views on the River Medway, 1793, 1 vol.
- Graphic Illustrations of Hogarth, 1794
- Picturesque Views on the Upper, or Warwickshire Avon, 1795, 1 vol.
- Miscellaneous Paper and Legal Instruments under the Hand and Seal of William Shakespeare, including the Tragedy of King Lear and a Small Fragment of Hamlet, from the Original Manuscripts in the Possession of Samuel Ireland, London, 1796
- Mr. Ireland's Vindication of His Conduct Respecting the Publication of the Supposed Shakspeare MSS., London, 1796
- An Investigation of Mr. Malone's Claim to the Character of Scholar or Critic, Being an Examination of His Inquiry into the Authenticity of the Shakespeare MSS., 1797
- Picturesque Views on the River Wye, 1797, 1 vol.
- Picturesque Views, with an Historical Account of the Inns of Court in London and Westminster, 1800
- Picturesque Views on the River Severn (2 vols.), with coloured lithographs, after drawings by Ireland, and descriptions by T. Harral, 1824
