= The Abbess =

1799 novel by William Henry

The Abbess: A Romance
- Title page from the first edition
- Author: William Henry Ireland
- Language: English
- Genre: Gothic novel
- Publisher: Earle and Hemet
- Publication date: 1799
- Publication place: England
- Media type: Print
- Pages: 264 (vol. 1), 240 (vol. 2), 215 (vol. 3), 212 (vol. 4)
- ISBN: 9780405060151

The Abbess: A Romance is a gothic novel by William Henry Ireland first published in 1799. The text was modelled upon Matthew Lewis's The Monk (1796).

The eponymous central character, Mother Vittoria Bracciano, is similar to that of "Monk" Lewis's Ambrosio, as she is likewise motivated by dark and powerful forces.

The novel is one of the most voluptuous and salacious gothic novels in terms of its graphic scenes of sex, Roman Catholic religious fervour and torture.

== Influence on the Gothic Genre ==
According to Benjamin F. Fisher, Edgar Allan Poe was familiar with Ireland's work and The Abbess influenced some of his macabre later works.

== Publication history ==
The book was first published in four volumes in 1799, printed for Earle and Hemet. The epigraph states that it is lifted from Shakespeare; however it is actually taken from John Dryden's 1679 rewrite of Troilus and Cressida. A full edition of the text can be read online here. A further British edition was published in 1834.

In 1822 and 1836, there were two publications in Spanish. In 1824, there was a German edition.

== Character List ==
Donna Laura is one of the suggested previous love interests of Marcello, but is pursued by Vivani.

Duca Bertocci is Maddalena's father and head of an illustrious family. AfterI his wife (Marchese di Carnaro) died, he became quite reclusive and rarely sees his daughter. His son died of a fever at a young age.

Gerardo & Tomaso are two of the known servants of Marcello. Both are seen as very devoted.

Giacinta joined the sisterhood in the middle of the night, and is a very beautiful young woman. She quickly befriends Maddalena, giving her a manuscript describing her past.

Maddalena Rosa is the daughter of Duca di Bertocci. Her mother died during childbirth with her brother, who died of a fever when he was young. Maddalena is a nun at the Sisterhood of Santa Maria and is close friends with Marietta. She is known to be very beautiful, and was the love interest of Marcello from the first time he saw her. After Marietta's death, Maddalena begins to sleepwalk and eventually meets Marcello. This meeting angers the Abbess and leads to Maddalena being sent away.

Marcello (Conte) is the novel's main protagonist and the romantic hero. He is also best friends with Vivani. It is suggested that he has had previous love interests before, including Donna Laura. Although in love with Maddalena, Marcello accidentally confesses his love to the wrong woman (the Abbess herself). This results in the Abbess taking her revenge on the lovers.

Marietta (Donna Orsini) is Maddalena's closest friend in the convent; however this becomes difficult when Marietta takes the veil. This often creates difficulty for the two. After Maddalena has some visions in her sleep, Marietta becomes ill with a fever and later dies – Maddalena never leaving her side.

Padre Ubaldo is a monk belonging to the monastery of Santa Croce. It is noted throughout the text that he is ugly with a “flaccid face”. His name isn't revealed till partway through Volume 1 of the novel, which increases the mystery surrounding his character. To show his devotion, Ubaldo is known to perform self-flagellation as a form of worship. He is devout to the Abbess and helps her derive the plan to send Maddalena away.

Sister Beatrice is an evil sister at the convent of Santa Maria. Disliked by many of the other nuns, when she was younger a gentleman from Naples rejected her hand. After apparently being back in high spirits, the man was later found missing.

Vittoria Bracciano (The Abbess) is the title character of the novel. From the outset she is seen as elevated from the rest of the sisterhood. She carries a commanding aura, which is not only beautiful but also shows sign of malice. The Abbess is descended from “one of the noblest families in Italy” and was the youngest of several daughters – leading to her father procuring her the role of Lady Abbess.

Vivani is Marcello's best friend, who he met in school, and the Conte de Porta. After losing his mother when he was a child, he became Conte when he turned 18, after his father died. Characterised as being lively and free-spirited, Vivani is often caught seducing and accosting women.

== Plot summary ==
=== Vol. I ===
Set in Florence, most of the action is based around Santa Maria del Nova. During the opening mass, Conte Marcello notices the beauty of the young nun, Maddalena Rosa. He revisits the convent again hoping to see her, but on leaving he is detained by a mysterious monk insisting he has important information for the Conte. The monk asks Marcello to return to the cloister that night; agreeing, Marcello returns armed with a poniard hidden under his vest.

Later that night he is surprised by the monk, who leads him to a hidden chamber containing a statue of the Virgin Mary. Before continuing on, the monk kneels performing self-flagellation. Continuing to a second chamber full of relics, the monk tells Marcello that he has to swear a secret oath before continuing. However, before the oath can be sworn, the two are interrupted by a tolling bell, causing the monk and Marcello to flee. The monk asks Marcello to return the following night.

Upon returning home, Marcello is greeted by his close friend Vivani, whom he tells that he saw a beautiful woman. Vivani convinces Marcello to come to the Galetti Palace that evening where the Marchese is holding a concert. At the concert, Marcello is introduced to Duca Bertoccia, who (unbeknownst to Marcello) is the father of Maddalena.

At eleven o'clock, Marcello leaves the party and heads to the convent, when he notices that he is being followed by three cloaked figures. The figures then draw rapiers and turn on Marcello. After a brief scuffle, the conte kills two of the attackers whilst the third flees. After wrapping a small wound on his arm, he returns to the scene to find the attackers’ bodies gone. Meeting the monk again, the conte is instead taken into a large portrait gallery, where he can hear the signora's voice. The monk then informs him that he can't see the signora that night and instead he must return again. When he gets back to his home, Marcello is greeted by his panicked servants, who note his injury and rush to fetch a surgeon.

Maddelena's account covers a similar version of events, demonstrating that she too noticed Marcello at the service. After the service, the young nun is overcome with emotion, leading to her having a walk through the convent gardens with her good friend Marietta. That night she dreams of the mysterious stranger (Marcello), but the dreams quickly descend into nightmares where she encounters ghostly apparitions of her friends, including Marietta.

The next night, Marcello once again visits this convent, however instead a veiled nun leads him to a chamber, where he meets a nun who he supposes is Maddalena. After swearing an oath of secrecy, the two kiss, only to discover that it is in fact the Abbess and not Maddalena. Shocked, he claims he is overwhelmed with religious respect for Vittoria, who explains that she is not entirely restrained by religious laws and her passion is her form of confession.

During this time, Marietta falls sick with a fever and soon dies, leaving Maddalena distraught and alone. Before dying, Marietta tells Maddalena not to stray from the path of virtue and that the conte is worthy of her affections. That night the nuns are awakened by a mysterious knocking at the gate of the convent – where a mysterious young woman is seeking sanctuary. The woman is said to be named Giacinta, and follows Maddalena into the garden where she gives her a manuscript describing her predicament.

Meeting again with Vivani, Marcello discovers that Vivani was also attacked after being cheated by a pair of sisters whom he was pursuing. Marcello tells him about his love for Maddalena (as his oath is to keep the Abbess' secret). The conte later returns to Santa Maria to fulfil his commitment to the Abbess, and on arrival gets drunk in order to become unconscious. Awoken at four in the morning by the Abbess' kiss, he is led part of the way. Left on his own, he gets lost and stumbles into a gloomy chamber where he discovers a kneeling woman.

The woman turns out to be a sleeping Maddalena, and upon accidentally waking her up, Marcello begins to apologise. She convinces him to leave before the pair are interrupted by the Abbess and the monk (who turns out to be Padre Ubaldo). Vittoria interrogates Marcello as if she doesn't know him, and in response, he tells her that he has lied about his emotions. Bidding Maddalena return to her cell, Vittoria turns on the conte, telling him that he will never see Maddalena again.

Maddalena is summoned by Sister Beatrice and is in turn interrogated, although her ignorance is true, resulting in her being locked in her cell. Determined to get rid of Maddalena, Padre Ubaldo leaves to persuade Ducca Bertocci to send his daughter away, in which he succeeds.

The young nun is awakened in the middle of the night by sister Beatrice, who tells her to prepare for a journey. Before she is sent away, Giacanta comes out and embraces her, wishing she knew the reasons for the punishment. Maddalena's journey leads her to a gloomy castle owned by her father, where there are only two attendants.
