= Clement Mansfield Ingleby =

English Shakespearian scholar

Clement Mansfield Ingleby (29 October 1823 – 26 September 1886) was an English Shakespearean scholar.

== Early life and education ==
Clement Ingleby was born at Edgbaston near Birmingham, the son of a lawyer. Poor health – he was not expected to live long – kept him from attending school, so he was privately educated at home. He went to Trinity College, Cambridge, when twenty years old, and specialised in mathematics. He received his B.A. in 1847 and his M.A. in 1850. Returning to Birmingham he went to work in his father's law office, and then became a partner in the firm of Ingleby, Wragge, and Ingleby (later Wragge & Co LLP). In spite of his poor health, he devoted his spare time to metaphysics, mathematics, and English literature.

In 1850 Ingleby married Sarah Oakes (d. 3 January 1906).

== Class in logic ==
In 1855 the Birmingham and Midland Institute was established, an experiment in continuing adult education. Ingleby took on giving a class in logic and metaphysics at the industrial branch. His methods were novel and the class was successful. A disciple of William Hamilton, Ingleby focused on the most current views, even obtaining from Hamilton his yet-unpublished improvements. Urged by his students, Ingleby issued Outlines of Theoretical Logic in 1856 as a textbook in the subject. It was his first published volume.

== Collier Shakespeare controversy ==
In the 1850s documents brought forward by John Payne Collier bearing on Elizabethan stage history in general and Shakespeare's life in particular fell under suspicion. Re-examination of several documents showed them to be out-and-out forgeries, forgeries so obvious it was difficult to see how Collier could have been deceived by them. One item of particular interest, the Perkins Folio, had never been examined by anybody besides Collier. It contained many corrections in what appeared to be a 16th-century hand that Collier suggested might be based on stage tradition. Ingleby and Sir Frederick Madden, who put the resources of the British Museum on the task, were finally able to examine the Perkins Folio in detail. They discovered—as was the case with others of the forgeries—modern pencil-marks under the supposedly ancient writing. The handwriting of these appeared to be Collier's.

The conclusion was inescapable: Collier himself must have forged these documents. In 1859 Ingleby published a small volume entitled The Shakespeare Fabrications, dispassionately setting forth these facts. (An appendix to this volume dealing with the Ireland Shakespeare forgeries, however, was later repudiated by the author.) Collier denied the allegations, but Ingleby's A Complete View of the Shakespeare Controversy closed the discussion, and Collier did not reply.

== Move to London ==
Ingleby abandoned law for literature in 1859, and removed from Birmingham to the neighbourhood of London. His early works were of a philosophical nature (his Introduction to Metaphysics in two parts came out in 1864 and 1869), but he is best known as the author of a long series of works on Shakespearean subjects. In 1874 appeared The Still Lion, enlarged in 1875 as Shakespeare Hermeneutics. This warned against needless emendation of Shakespeare's text and explained some alleged problems. In 1875 Shakespeare's Centurie of Prayse came out, a definitive collection of allusions to Shakespeare and his works between 1592 and 1692. Other contributions include Shakespeare: the Man and the Book (a collection of essays in two volumes, 1877 and 1881), Shakespeare's Bones (1882), and Shakespeare and the Enclosure of the Common Fields at Welcombe (1885).

== Other interests ==
Ingleby was also a musician (he sang Shakespearean songs as part of the 1864 tercentenary celebration of Shakespeare's birth in Birmingham), a chess enthusiast who contributed problems to Chess Player's Chronicle and the Illustrated London News, and a member of the Athenæum Club. At various times he was Secretary of the Birmingham and Edgbaston Chess Club and a vice-president of the Royal Society of Literature.

== Death ==
Ill-health had plagued him throughout his life, and in 1886 he became seriously ill. His edition of Cymbeline had just come out when he died on 26 September 1886.

== Character ==
Ingleby took a dark view of his own character: "I am morally weak in many respects," he wrote. "In some matters I have been systematically deceptive, and occasionally cowardly and treacherous. I am passionately fond of personal beauty; but on the whole, I dislike my kind, and my natural affections are weak" Horace Howard Furness, however, wrote of him:

Dr. Ingleby's retentive memory gave him ready control of the learning gathered from extensive reading, while his habits of precise logical expression aided and subdued his poetic fancy. To an unusual degree he was a many sided man—an excellent musician, and eminent in Metaphysics and in Mathematics. I well remember the cordial admiration with which one of the most celebrated Mathematicians of our day, spoke of a solution by Dr. Ingleby of a problem that had proved to all others too intrinsecate to unloose. … Never was there a man more ready than he to give of his best to all who applied to him for literary aid and comfort.

== Selected works ==
- Outlines of Theoretical Logic: Founded on the New Analytic of Sir William Hamilton, Cambridge, 1856.
- The Shakespeare Fabrications, London, 1859.
- A Complete View of the Shakspere Controversy, London, 1861.
- Was Thomas Lodge an Actor?, London, 1868.
- Reflections Historical and Critical on the Revival of Philosophy at Cambridge, 1870.
- The Shakspere Allusion Books, London, 1874.
- Shakespeare's Centurie of Prayse: Being Materials for a History of Opinion on Shakespeare and His Works, London, 1874; 2nd edition, 1879.
- Shakespeare Hermeneutics; Or, The Still Lion: Being an Essay Towards the Restoration of Shakespeare's Text, London, 1875.
- Shakespeare: The Man and the Book: Being a Collection of Occasional Papers on the Bard and His Writings; Part the First, London, 1877.
- Occasional Papers on Shakespeare, Being the Second Part of Shakespeare: The Man and the Book, London, 1881.
- Shakespeare's Bones: The Proposal to Disinter Them, Considered in Relation to their Possible Bearing on His Portraiture, London, 1883.
