= John Montagu, 4th Earl of Sandwich =

British statesman (1718–1792)

The Right Honourable The Earl of Sandwich PC FRS
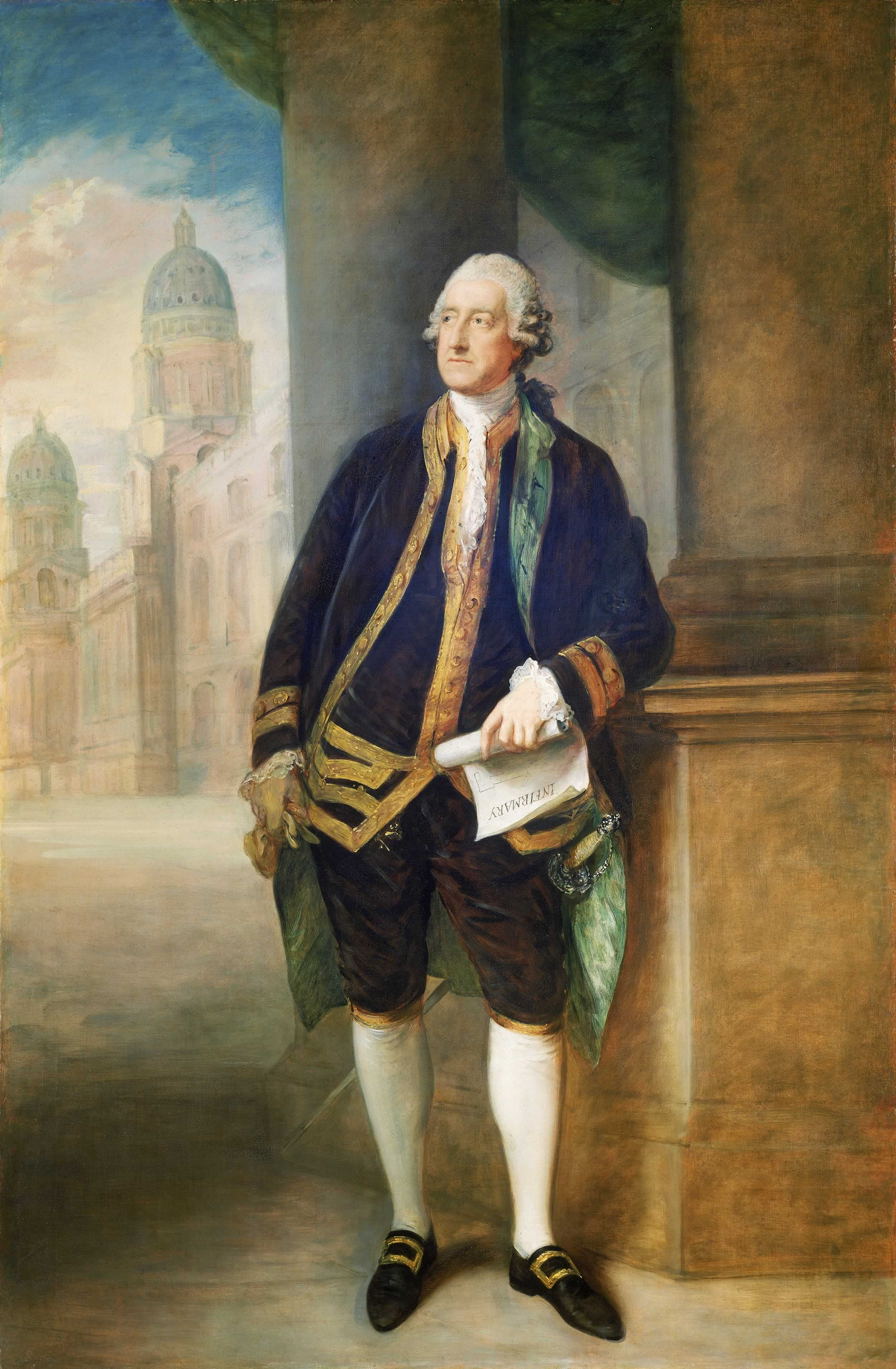
- Portrait of the Earl of Sandwich by Thomas Gainsborough, 1783

Secretary of State for the Northern Department
- In office 19 December 1770 – 12 January 1771
- Prime Minister: Lord North
- Preceded by: The Earl of Rochdale
- Succeeded by: The Earl of Halifax
- In office 9 September 1763 – 10 July 1765
- Prime Minister: George Grenville
- Preceded by: The Earl of Halifax
- Succeeded by: The Duke of Grafton

First Lord of the Admiralty
- In office 1771–1782
- Prime Minister: Lord North
- Preceded by: Sir Edward Hawke
- Succeeded by: The Viscount Keppel
- In office 1763–1763
- Prime Minister: The Earl of Bute
- Preceded by: George Grenville
- Succeeded by: The Earl of Egmont
- In office 1748–1751
- Prime Minister: Henry Pelham
- Preceded by: The Duke of Bedford
- Succeeded by: The Lord Anson

Postmaster General
- In office 1768–1771
- Prime Minister: The Duke of Grafton; Lord North
- Preceded by: The Marquess of Downshire
- Succeeded by: Henry Carteret

Personal details
- Born: 3 November 1718
- Died: 30 April 1792 (aged 73) Chiswick, Middlesex, England
- Resting place: All Saints' Church, Barnwell
- Spouse: Dorothy Fane
- Domestic partner: Martha Ray
- Children: by Dorothy: John Montagu, 5th Earl of Sandwich; by Martha: at least five and perhaps as many as nine children, including Basil Montagu
- Parents: Edward Montagu, Viscount Hinchingbrooke; Elizabeth Popham
- Education: Eton College; Trinity College, Cambridge
- Profession: Statesman

John Montagu, 4th Earl of Sandwich, PC, FRS (13 November 1718 – 30 April 1792) was a British statesman who succeeded his grandfather Edward Montagu, 3rd Earl of Sandwich, as the Earl of Sandwich in 1729, at the age of ten. He held various military and political offices during his life, including Postmaster General, First Lord of the Admiralty, and Secretary of State for the Northern Department. He is also known for the claim that he is the inventor of the sandwich.

== Biography ==
=== Early years ===
John Montagu was born in 1718, the son of Edward Montagu, Viscount Hinchingbrooke. His father died when John was four, leaving him as his heir. His mother soon remarried and he had little further contact with her. He succeeded his grandfather as Earl of Sandwich in 1729, at the age of ten. He was educated at Eton and at Trinity College, Cambridge. He spent the years 1737-1740 travelling, initially going on the Grand Tour around Continental Europe before visiting the more unusual destinations of Greece, Turkey, and Egypt which were then part of the Ottoman Empire. On his return to England he maintained an interest in Orientalist studies. In 1742 he was a founder and the first president ('Sheik') of the Egyptian Society and in 1744 he was elected 'Vizir' of the newly formed Divan Club. In 1740 he was elected fellow of the Society of Antiquaries and admitted to the Society of Dilettanti.. He was also an early member of the Sublime Society of Beef Steaks.

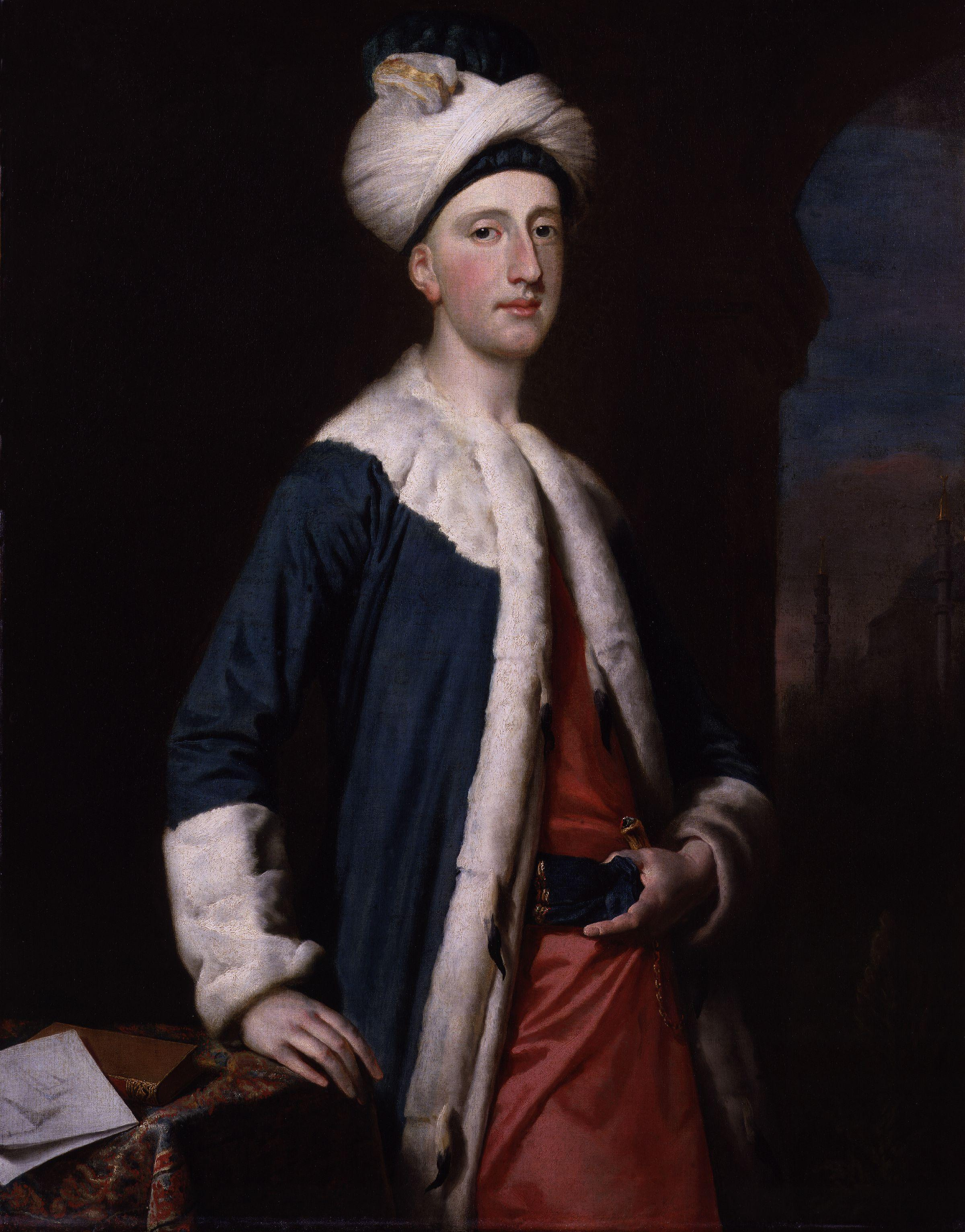
John Montagu, 4th Earl of Sandwich in 1740 wearing the exotic fur-lined costume that he had adopted when travelling in the East by Joseph Highmore (National Portrait Gallery, London )

On his return to England in 1739, Montagu took his seat in the House of Lords as a follower of the Duke of Bedford, one of the wealthiest and most powerful politicians of the era. He became a Patriot Whig and one of the sharpest critics of the Walpole government, attacking the government's strategy in the War of the Austrian Succession. Like many Patriot Whigs, Lord Sandwich was opposed to Britain's support of Hanover and strongly opposed the deployment of British troops on the European Continent to protect it, instead arguing that Britain should make greater use of its naval power. He gained attention for his speeches in parliament. His oratory earned him a reputation for clearly setting out his argument even if he lacked natural eloquence.

=== Political career ===
In 1744, the Duke of Bedford was invited to join the government, now headed by Henry Pelham, taking the post of First Lord of the Admiralty. Sandwich joined him as one of the commissioners of the Admiralty, in effect serving as deputy under Bedford. The experienced Admiral Lord Anson also joined the Admiralty board and was an influential figure. Bedford spent much of his time at his country estate, and much of the day-to-day running of the Admiralty fell to Sandwich and Anson. Anson had control of the training and discipline of the navy, while Sandwich focused on the administration. Following a proposal by Admiral Edward Vernon, the concept of a Western Squadron was pioneered, which proved very successful. This marked a radical shift in British naval strategy, and led to British success at the Battles of Cape Finisterre.

The following year, Sandwich took a commission as a colonel in the British Army as part of the response to the Jacobite rising and the prospect of a French invasion. In order to boost the relatively small British army, a number of units were raised by prominent figures, and Sandwich served in the regiment formed by Bedford. While serving in The Midlands, he fell seriously ill with fever and nearly died. After his recovery, he returned to his duties at the admiralty. He remained an army officer for the rest of his life, remaining on the half-pay list and eventually rising to the rank of general, even though he took no further active part in the army.

=== Congress of Breda ===
In 1746 he was sent as a plenipotentiary to the Congress of Breda, and he continued to take part in the negotiations for peace until the Treaty of Aix-la-Chapelle was concluded in 1748. Sandwich was also made ambassador to the Dutch Republic during the talks. Using the resources of the British secret service, Sandwich was able to outmanoeuvre his French counterpart by intercepting the latter's secret correspondence. His service at Breda drew him to the attention of the influential Thomas Pelham-Holles, 1st Duke of Newcastle, who lobbied for him to be given high office when he returned home.

It is possible that during his time at Breda, he played a role in the 1747 Dutch Revolution which brought William IV, Prince of Orange wider powers, something supported by Britain as they hoped the Prince would improve the Dutch Republic's military performance in the ongoing war in the Low Countries. However, there is no firm evidence of this.

=== First Lord of the Admiralty (first and second spells) ===
In February 1748 he became First Lord of the Admiralty, retaining this post until June 1751. By 1751 Newcastle, who had previously admired Sandwich for his forthright and hardline views, had increasingly begun to distrust him and his relationship with the Duke of Bedford whom Newcastle regarded as a rival. Newcastle engineered the dismissal of both of them, by sacking Sandwich. Bedford resigned in protest, as Newcastle had calculated, allowing him to replace them with men he considered more loyal personally to him.

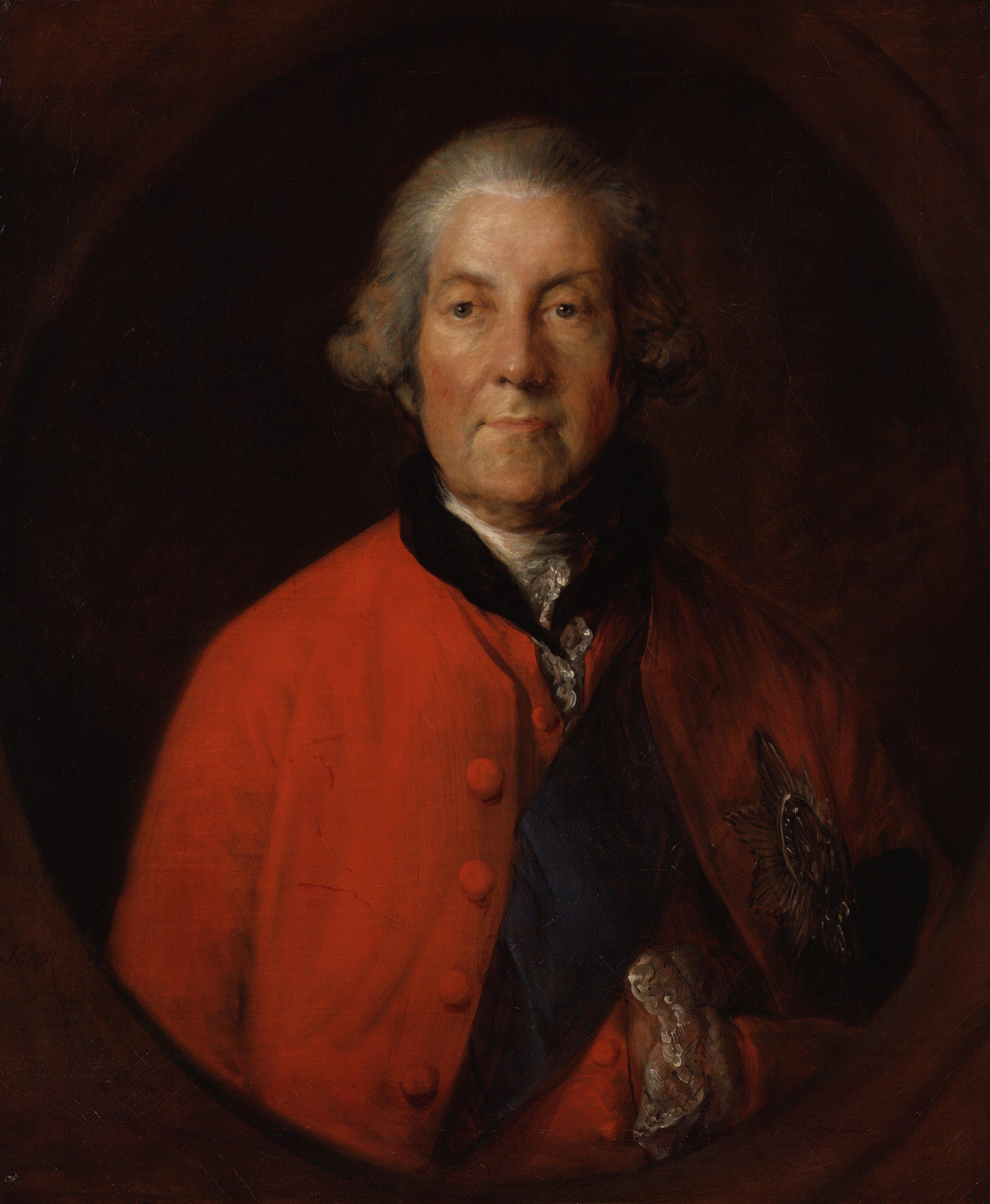
The Duke of Bedford was a long-standing patron of Sandwich, and his support helped him further his career.

For the next few years Sandwich spent time at his country estate, largely avoiding politics, though he kept in close contact with both Bedford and Anson and with Britain's participation in the Seven Years' War. Partly thanks to naval reforms pioneered by Anson and Sandwich, the Royal Navy enjoyed a series of successes and was able to blockade much of the French fleet in port.

In 1763 he returned to the Admiralty in the government of John Stuart, 3rd Earl of Bute, and encouraged a major rebuilding programme for the Royal Navy. Bute was a Tory who wished to bring the war to an end, which he did with the Treaty of Paris. It was during this time that Sandwich first met Martha Ray who became his long-standing mistress. He was soon dismissed from the office, but was offered the influential position of Ambassador to Madrid.

=== Northern Secretary ===
In August 1763 Sandwich became Secretary of State for the Northern Department, in the government of George Grenville who had replaced Bute. While filling this office he took a leading part in the successful prosecution of the radical MP John Wilkes for obscene libel. Although he had been allegedly associated with Wilkes in the notorious Hellfire Club (also known as the Monks of Medmenham), recent scholarship has suggested that the two had a more distant but cordial relationship than the friendship which was popularly portrayed at the time. John Gay's The Beggar's Opera was played in Covent Garden shortly thereafter, and the similarity of Sandwich's conduct to that of Jemmy Twitcher, betrayer of Macheath in that play, permanently attached to him that appellation. Wilkes was eventually expelled from the House of Commons.

He held the post of Northern Secretary until July 1765. His departure from the post coincided with the end of George Grenville's term as prime minister. He hoped to return to office swiftly, provided a united opposition could be formed.

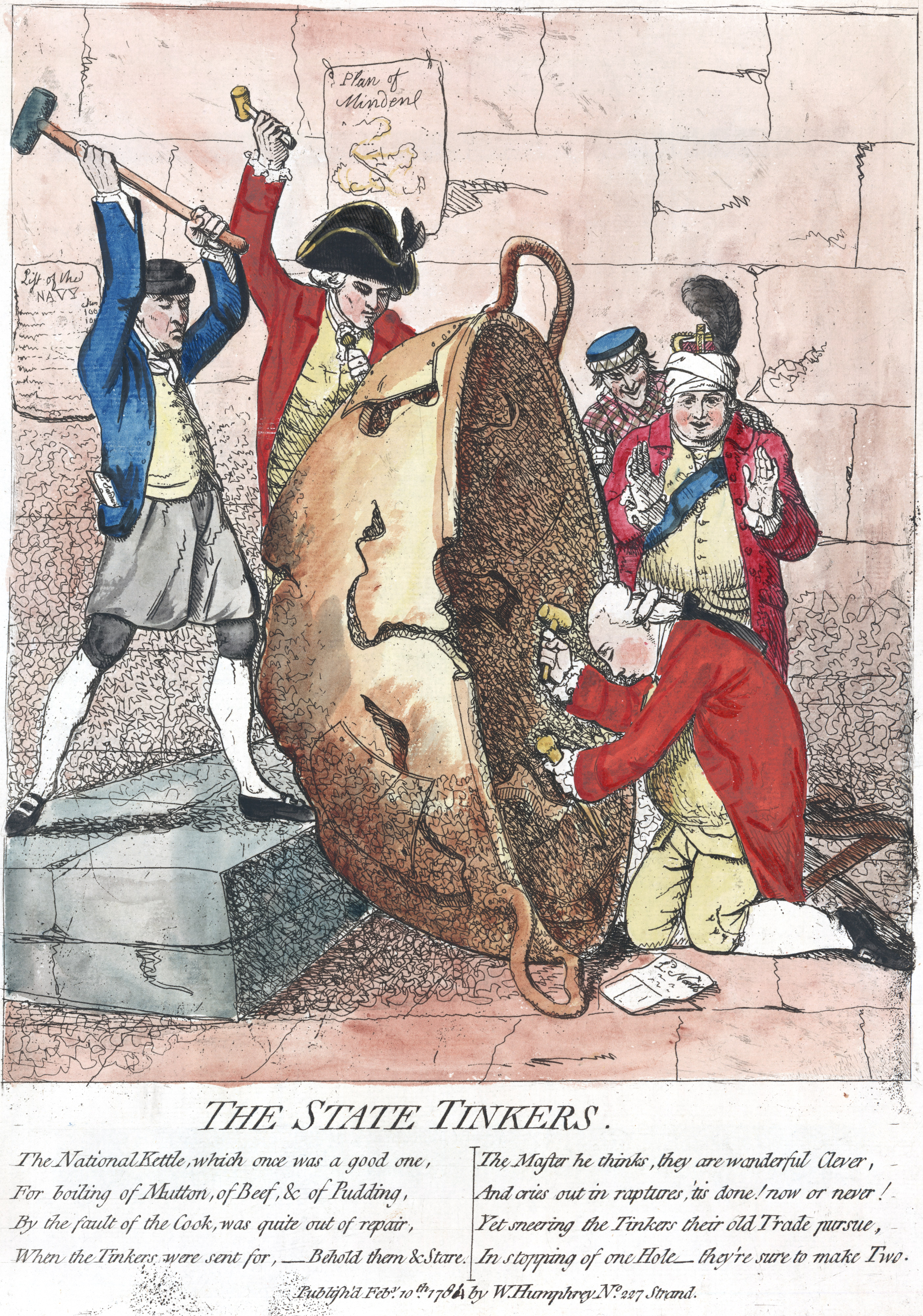
In The State Tinkers (1780), James Gillray caricatured Sandwich (on left) and his political allies in the North government as incompetent tinkers.

Sandwich was postmaster general from 1768 to 1771 and briefly secretary of state again from December 1770 to January 1771.

=== First Lord of the Admiralty (third spell) ===
Sandwich served again as First Lord of the Admiralty in Lord North's administration from 1771 to 1782. He replaced the distinguished Admiral Sir Edward Hawke in the post. His appointment to the post followed the Falklands Crisis which had nearly seen Britain go to war with Spain over the Falkland Islands in the South Atlantic Ocean after the Capture of Port Egmont by Spanish forces. War had only been averted when Louis XVI refused to back the Spanish over the dispute. Both France and Spain resented what they considered British hegemony following the Seven Years' War, and desired to overturn the imbalance of power; war was widely expected to break out between the nations in the near future.

In 1774, only three years into his third term, Sandwich commissioned a series of ship models and a model of Chatham Dockyard as a gift to George III in an attempt to interest his king in naval matters. However, Sandwich's overall administration of the navy in the lead up to and during the American War of Independence was traditionally portrayed as being incompetent, with insufficient ships being ready for the outbreak of war with France in 1778. In 1775, Sandwich spoke vociferously in opposition to a plan for British America put forth by Benjamin Franklin and the Earl of Chatham. When Britain and France went to war, Sandwich advocated a strategy of concentrating the British fleet in European waters to deter invasion in opposition to his colleague, Lord Germain, who pushed for more ships to be sent to North America. The cabinet largely followed Sandwich's policy, retaining footholds on the American coast which could be used as naval bases, while retaining the bulk of the fleet at home. Sandwich's problems increased when Spain entered the war on France's side in 1779 giving the Bourbon fleets a numerical advantage over the Royal Navy.

Prior to 1778 Keppel failed to persuade Sandwich to ignore technical difficulties and "copper sheath only a few ships"; he was later possibly unfairly to make political capital out of this in The London Magazine, March 1781. He had remarked that coppering "gave additional strength to the navy" and he reproached Lord Sandwich with having "refused to sheath only a few ships with copper" at his request, when he had since ordered the whole navy to be sheathed. The lack of coppering the navy was one of the key reasons leading to Britain losing the Thirteen Colonies.

In 1778 the new Navy Board Controller Charles Middleton, who had the major problem at the time with supplying over 100 ships for the American Revolutionary War (1775–1783), compounded that year by French opportunism in declaring war on Britain to support the American rebels, effectively turned what was a local civil war into a global conflict. Others followed: Spain in 1779 and the Netherlands in 1780. Middleton took the view that Britain was "outnumbered at every station", and the navy was required to "extricate us from present danger". He understood that coppering allowed the navy to stay at sea for much longer without the need for cleaning and repairs to the underwater hull, making it a very attractive, if expensive, proposition. On 21 January 1779 he wrote to the Admiralty, and petitioned King George directly. The King backed him for what was an expensive process for an untested technology, and in May 1779 he placed orders at the Portsmouth Docks for coppering a total 51 ships within a year.

During 1779 a combined Franco-Spanish fleet was able to sail into the English Channel to threaten the coast of Cornwall in the initial stage of a Franco-Spanish invasion of Britain. Sandwich was criticised for the failure of the smaller British Channel Fleet to prevent this, although the invasion never materialised.

After 1778, the primary objective in the war was maintaining control over the sugar-rich West Indian archipelago. The lucrative sugar trade in the Caribbean was reckoned at the time as being of more importance to British interests than the 13 colonies. The sugar trade was paying for the costs of the American Revolutionary War (1775–1783) and the Anglo-French War (1778–1783). The Royal Navy's newly coppered ships as yet untested were used successfully by Rodney in defeating the French at the Battle of the Saintes off Dominica in February 1782.

By the time Sandwich's administration ended, he would take full credit for coppering the fleet as one of his great achievements when defending his record in office in January 1782.

=== Personal life ===
Black-and-white reproduction of a pastel portrait of a lady of the Montagu family, possibly Dorothy, wife of the 4th Earl of Sandwich, or his sister Elizabeth Courtenay, by Francis Cotes RA, 1758

Fanny Murray, Portrait for the Divan Club (West Wycombe Park), 1744

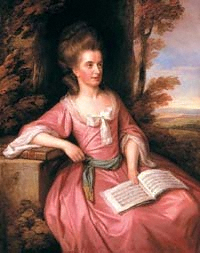
Martha Ray by Nathaniel Dance, 1777

For several years Sandwich had as a mistress Fanny Murray, the subject of John Wilkes' An Essay on Woman (1763), but he eventually married Dorothy Fane, daughter of the 1st Viscount Fane, by whom he had a son, John, Viscount Hinchingbrooke (1743–1814), who later succeeded as 5th Earl. Sandwich's first tragedy was his wife's deteriorating health and eventual insanity. During his wife's decline, Sandwich started an affair with a singer named Martha Ray. During their relationship, Ray bore him at least five, and perhaps as many as nine, children, including Basil Montagu (1770–1851), writer, jurist and philanthropist. According to several sources, Sandwich was unable to provide adequately and permanently for his mistress and their children; she therefore encouraged the suit of Captain James Hackman (who in March 1779 exchanged the army for the clergy). In April 1779, Ray was killed by a shot to the head in the foyer of the Royal Opera House (Covent Garden) at the hands of Hackman, Rector of Wiveton. Sandwich never recovered from his grief. The events surrounding Ray's murder were depicted in the popular novel Love and Madness (1780) by Herbert Croft.

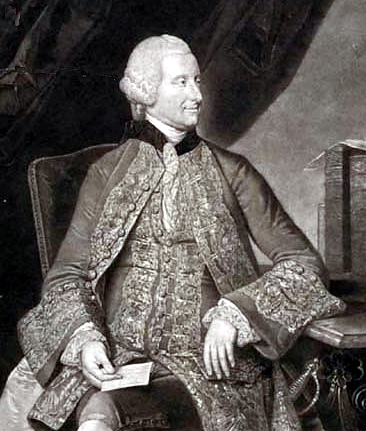
A mezzotint print of the Earl engraved by Valentine Green, after Johann Zoffany, published 30 August 1774

In a famous exchange with the actor Samuel Foote, Sandwich declared, "Foote, I have often wondered what catastrophe would bring you to your end; but I think, that you must either die of the pox, or the halter." "My lord", replied Foote instantaneously, "that will depend upon one of two contingencies; – whether I embrace your lordship's mistress, or your lordship's principles." This retort is often mistakenly attributed to John Wilkes.

Sandwich retired from public duty in 1782, and lived another ten years in retirement at the family seat, Hinchingbrooke House, Huntingdonshire, dying on 30 April 1792. His title of Earl of Sandwich passed to his eldest son, John Montagu, 5th Earl of Sandwich, who was 48 years old at the time. Sandwich was buried in All Saints' Church in Barnwell, Northamptonshire, of which only the chancel survives, kept to preserve the Montagu tombs.

== Legacy ==
Sandwich retired in 1782. Despite holding a number of important posts during his career, Sandwich's incompetence and corruption were legendary, inspiring the saying: "Seldom has any man held so many offices and accomplished so little."

Some historians have suggested that Lord Sandwich was not perhaps as incompetent as suggested, but that previous historians have placed too much emphasis on sources from his political enemies.

=== The sandwich ===
The modern sandwich is named after Lord Sandwich, but the circumstances of its invention and original use are the subject of debate. A rumour in a contemporaneous travel book by Pierre-Jean Grosley, Tour to London (published 1772), formed the popular myth that bread and meat sustained Lord Sandwich at the gambling table, but Sandwich had many habits, including the Hellfire Club, and any story may be a creation after the fact. Lord Sandwich was a very conversant gambler, the story goes, and he did not take the time to have a meal during his long hours playing at the card table. Consequently, he would ask his servants to bring him slices of meat between two slices of bread, a habit known among his gambling friends. Other people, according to this account, began to order "the same as Sandwich!", and thus the "sandwich" was born. The sober alternative to this account is provided by Sandwich's biographer N. A. M. Rodger, who suggests that Sandwich's commitments to the navy, to politics, and to the arts mean that the first sandwich was more likely to have been consumed at his work desk.

=== Islands named after Sandwich by Capt. James Cook ===
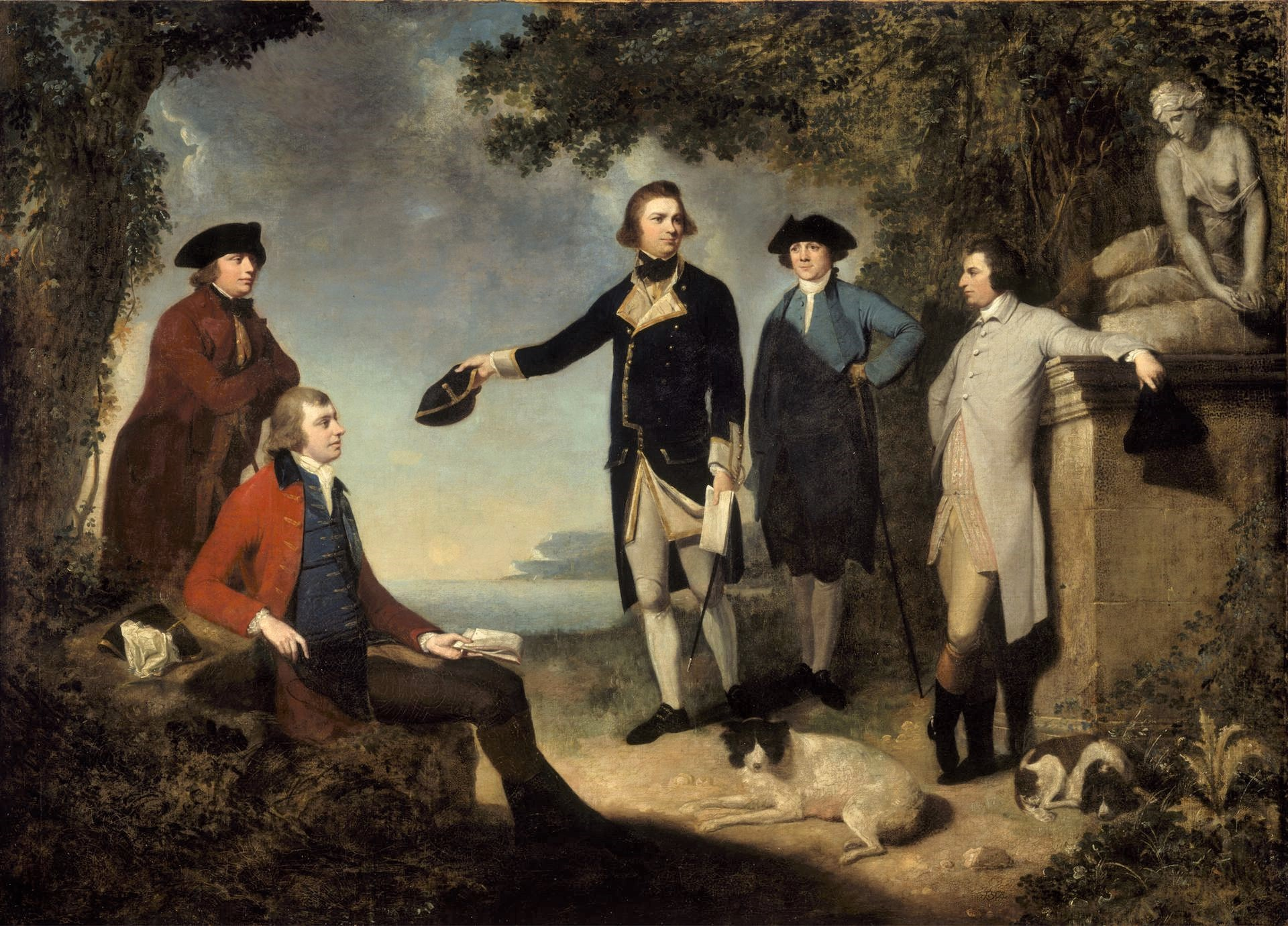
Dr Daniel Solander, Sir Joseph Banks, Captain James Cook, Dr John Hawkesworth and Lord Sandwich by John Hamilton Mortimer, 1771. Use a cursor to see who is who.

Lord Sandwich was a great supporter of Captain James Cook. As First Lord of the Admiralty, Sandwich approved Admiralty funds for the purchase and fit-out of the Resolution, Adventure and Discovery for Cook's second and third expeditions of exploration in the Pacific Ocean. He also arranged an audience with the King, which was an unusual privilege for a lower ranking officer. In honour of Sandwich, Cook named the Sandwich Islands (Hawaii) after him, as well as the South Sandwich Islands in the Southern Atlantic Ocean and Montague Island in the Gulf of Alaska. Hinchinbrook Island was named for the House owned by the Montagu family. Lord Sandwich donated the various items given him by Cook to Trinity College at the University of Cambridge. He also met the young Ra'iatean Omai, whom Cook had brought to Europe, and took him to his country estate for a week, presenting him with a suit of armour.

== Cricket ==
Martha Ray and the Earl of Sandwich from the Town and Country Magazine, 1769 No 10 Vol 1(National Portrait Gallery)

Like his friends John Russell, 4th Duke of Bedford and George Montagu-Dunk, 2nd Earl of Halifax, Sandwich was keen on cricket. The earliest surviving record of his involvement in the sport comes from 1741 when, as the patron and captain of the Huntingdonshire county team, Sandwich and Halifax formed the Northamptonshire & Huntingdonshire team which twice defeated Bedfordshire, first at Woburn Park and then at Cow Meadow, Northampton.

== Music ==
After his naval career, Sandwich turned his energy toward music. He became a great proponent of "ancient music" (defined by him as music more than two decades old). He was the patron of the Italian violinist Felice Giardini, and created a "Catch Club", where professional singers would sing "ancient" and modern catches, glees, and madrigals. He also put on performances of George Frideric Handel's oratorios, masques, and odes at his estate. Sandwich was instrumental in putting together the Concert of Ancient Music, the first public concert to showcase a canonic repertory of old works.

== Chronology ==
- 1718: The 4th Earl of Sandwich is born on 13 November 1718
- 1729: Succeeds his grandfather, Edward Montagu, 3rd Earl of Sandwich, in the earldom
- 1729: Educated at Eton and Trinity College, Cambridge
- 1740/41 (old style/new style), 14 March: marries The Hon. Dorothy Fane at St James's, Westminster
- 1746: Sent as plenipotentiary to the congress at Breda, and continues to take part in the negotiations for peace until the Treaty of Aix-la-Chapelle is signed in 1748
- 1748–1751: First term as First Lord of the Admiralty
- 1749–1756: Bailiff of the Bedford Level Corporation
- 1763: Becomes one of the principal secretaries of state
- 1763: Second term as First Lord of the Admiralty
- 1768: Appointed Postmaster General
- 1770: Becomes Secretary of State
- 1771–1782: Third and last term as First Lord of the Admiralty (during this term: the American Revolutionary War, 1775–1783)
- 1779: His mistress Martha Ray, mother of five of his children, murdered by her admirer James Hackman in Covent Garden
- 1782: Retires in March
- 1792: Dies on 30 April

== In literature and popular media ==
A plate of Sir Peter Lely's 1666 portrait of the 1st Earl appeared in Fisher's Drawing Room Scrap Book, 1837, together with a facsimile signature and a poetical illustration The Earl of Sandwich. by Letitia Elizabeth Landon, which actually relates to the 4th Earl (the islands being so-called in his honour).

The comedian Woody Allen wrote a short, satirical biography of the Earl, detailing his struggles to create the perfect sandwich, which was published as an article in The New Yorker on 8 October 1966.

Actor Bill Nighy was cast as Lord Sandwich in the TV series, Longitude in 2000.

== See also ==
- Secretary of State (England)
- Secretary of State for the Northern Department
- List of first lords of the Admiralty
- Postmaster General of the United Kingdom

== Bibliography ==
- Baker-Smith, Veronica (2008). Royal Discord: The Family of George III. Athena Press. pp. 232 pages. ISBN 978-1-84748-067-5.
- Black, Jeremy (2005) [1962]. The Continental Commitment: Britain, Hanover and Interventionism, 1714–1793. Routledge. pp. 292 pages.
- Levy, Martin (January 2005). Love & Madness: The Murder of Martha Ray, Mistress of the Fourth Earl of Sandwich Paperback. Harper Perennial. pp. 240 pages. ISBN 0-06-055975-6.
- Longmate, Norman (2001). Island Fortress: The Defence of Great Britain, 1603–1945. Pimlico.
- Maun, Ian (2009). From Commons to Lord's, Volume One: 1700 to 1750. Roger Heavens. ISBN 978-1-900592-52-9.
- Quanchi, Max (2005). Historical Dictionary of the Discovery and Exploration of the Pacific Islands. The Scarecrow Press. ISBN 0-8108-5395-7.
- Rodger, N. A. M (1993). The Insatiable Earl: A Life of John Montagu, Fourth Earl of Sandwich 1718-1792. London: HarperCollins. pp. 425 pages. ISBN 978-0-002-15784-1.
- Syrett, David (1998). The Royal Navy in European Waters During the American Revolutionary War. University of South Carolina.
- Waghorn, H. T. (1899). Cricket Scores, Notes, etc. (1730–1773). Blackwood.
- Whiteley, Peter (1996). Lord North: The Prime Minister Who Lost America. Hambledon Press.
- Rodger, N. A. M. "Montagu, John, fourth earl of Sandwich (1718–1792)". Oxford Dictionary of National Biography (online ed.). Oxford University Press. doi:10.1093/ref:odnb/19026. (Subscription, Wikipedia Library access or UK public library membership required.)
- "Montagu, John, 4th Earl of Sandwich (MNTG735J)". A Cambridge Alumni Database. University of Cambridge.

Political offices
Preceded by The Duke of Bedford	First Lord of the Admiralty; 1748–1751	Succeeded by The Lord Anson
Preceded by George Grenville	First Lord of the Admiralty; 1763	Succeeded by The Earl of Egmont
Preceded by The Earl of Halifax	Northern Secretary; 1763–1765	Succeeded by The Duke of Grafton
Preceded by The Earl of Rochford	Northern Secretary; 1770–1771	Succeeded by The Earl of Halifax
Preceded by Sir Edward Hawke	First Lord of the Admiralty; 1771–1782	Succeeded by The Viscount Keppel
Honorary titles
Preceded by The Duke of Queensberry and Dover	Senior Privy Counsellor; 1778–1792	Succeeded by The Marquess of Downshire
Peerage of England
Preceded by Edward Montagu	Earl of Sandwich; 1729–1792	Succeeded by John Montagu
