= John Croft (surgeon) =

English surgeon

- Born: 4 August 1833
- Died: 21 November 1905 (aged 72)
- Occupation: Surgeon

John Croft (4 August 1833 – 21 November 1905) was an English surgeon.

== Biography ==
Croft was born on 4 August 1833 at Pettinghoe near Newhaven, in Sussex, was son of Hugh Croft, who at the age of nineteen married his first wife Maria, aged sixteen. His grandfather, Gilmore Croft, a successful medical practitioner in the City of London, left Hugh Croft a competence, much of which was spent in farming. Hugh's first wife died in 1842, and marrying again he moved to Lower Clapton. John Croft was educated at the Hackney Church of England school, and through life held earnest religious views. He served a short apprenticeship with Thomas Evans of Burwash in Sussex, and entered St. Thomas's Hospital in 1850. Admitted M.R.C.S., and a licentiate of the Society of Apothecaries in 1854, he served as house surgeon at St. Thomas's Hospital. After spending five years (1855–60) as surgeon to the Dreadnought seamen's hospital ship, he returned to St. Thomas's to become demonstrator of anatomy and surgical registrar. He was successively resident assistant surgeon (Dec. 1863), assistant surgeon (1 Jan. 1871), and surgeon (1 July 1871), when the new buildings of the hospital were opened on the Albert Embankment. In the medical school he was in succession demonstrator of anatomy, lecturer on practical surgery, and lecturer on clinical surgery. He resigned his appointments in July 1891, when he was elected consulting surgeon. He was also surgeon to the Surrey dispensary; to the National Truss Society; to the Magdalen Hospital at Streatham, and to the National Provident Assurance Society. He was elected F.R.C.S. in 1859; was a member of the council (1882–90); vice-president in 1889, and a member of the court of examiners (1881–6).

Croft was one of the earlier hospital surgeons in London to adopt the improved methods advocated by Lister. His name is chiefly associated with the introduction of 'Croft's splints,' which were plaster of Paris cases made with scrubbing flannel and shaped to the limb. They were employed in place of the ordinary splints and the 'gum and chalk' bandages which had previously been used in the treatment of fractures of the leg. Croft was a strong advocate for early excision of the joint in cases of hip disease.

He died on 21 November 1905, and was buried in Kensal Green cemetery. He married in 1864 Annie, daughter of Alexander Douglas Douglas, but left no issue.

Croft contributed to the 'St. Thomas's Hospital Reports,' Holmes's 'System of Surgery,' the 'Transactions' of the Royal Medical and Chirurgical Society, the Clinical, and other medical societies.
