= Martha Ray =

British singer (1746–1779)

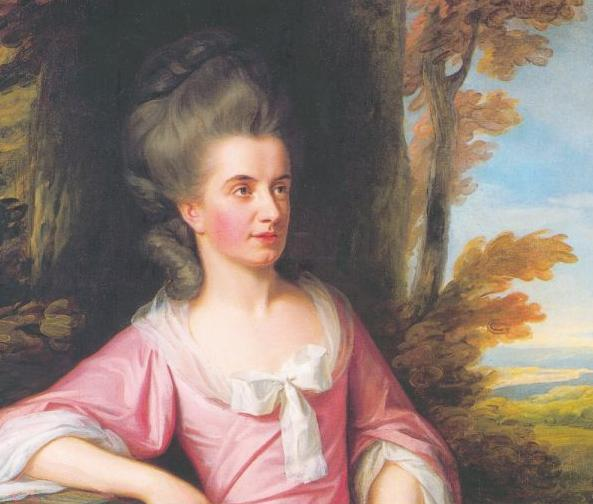
- Martha Ray by Nathaniel Dance, 1777 (detail of larger portrait)
- Born: 1746
- Died: 7 April 1779 (aged 32–33); Royal Opera House, Covent Garden, London, England
- Cause of death: Murdered by James Hackman
- Resting place: St Nicholas church, Elstree, Hertfordshire, England
- Occupation: Singer
- Known for: Mistress of John Montagu, 4th Earl of Sandwich
- Children: 5: Robert Montagu (Royal Navy officer); Augusta Montagu; Basil Montagu

Martha Ray (1746 – 7 April 1779) was a British singer of the Georgian era. Her father was a corsetmaker and her mother was a servant in a noble household. Good-looking, intelligent, and a talented singer, she came to the attention of many of her father's patrons.

The Town and Country Magazine, in October 1769, wrote of Matha Ray:

Miss R–y is a young lady of many accomplishments. Her parents were people in genteel life, who gave her an education equal, or rather superior to her station: she was placed at a boarding school near Chelsea, where she learnt all the polite acquirements in vogue: she was a great proficient in French and dancing; but was still superior in music, to which she gave additional charms by a most harmonious voice. These ornaments of education were displayed to great advantage, by a very genteel person, and most-engaging countenance: though not tall, she is graceful; and if she cannot boast of the finest complexion bestowed on the sex, there is an attractive sweetness in her eyes that is almost irresistible.

She is best known for her affair with John Montagu, 4th Earl of Sandwich. She lived with him as his mistress from the age of seventeen, while his wife was suffering from mental illness. She gave birth to nine children, five of whom survived, including the lawyer and philanthropist Basil Montagu. During this time, she conducted a successful singing career, for which she became well known, as well as completing her education with Lord Sandwich's support.

== Life and career ==
Sandwich set Ray up in a residence in Westminster, and gave her a generous allowance, allowing her a place to stay during periods in which she did not wish to remain at his home. In public, although Sandwich was married, the two acted as husband and wife. During this period, Ray was introduced to a soldier, James Hackman, by Sandwich. Hackman became a frequent visitor, and is thought to have proposed marriage to Ray on several instances, but she declined each time. Also by this time, Sandwich was deeply in debt. It is believed that while Sandwich was financially generous to Ray, he did not offer her any long-term financial security, which may have been what led Ray into tolerating Hackman's advances.

In 1779, Hackman left the British Army to join the church. At some point, believed to have been around 1778, Ray and Hackman had become involved romantically, but this affair was short-lived, by most reports due to her believing he lacked the financial means and social status to support her. However, Hackman was completely infatuated with Ray, becoming increasingly jealous, and continued to pursue her.

== Murder ==
On 7 April 1779, in the company of close friend and fellow singer Caterina Galli, Ray left her home to attend a performance of Isaac Bickerstaffe's comic opera Love in a Village. She had been approached by Hackman earlier that evening, but when she declined to tell him where she was going he followed her to the Royal Opera House at Covent Garden. After the performance at around 11:00 pm, Ray, Galli and William Hanger, Baron Coleraine, left the opera house together. Hackman seemingly believed that she had taken Hanger as another lover when he witnessed her taking Hanger's arm as they walked. Hackman later testified in court that "The will to destroy her who was dearer to me than life was never mine until a momentary frenzy overcame me’".

As Ray was about to climb into her carriage, Hackman approached and murdered her with a shot to the head with his pistol. Whether she and Coleraine were involved in an affair has never been clearly established.

Martha Ray and the Earl of Sandwich from the Town and Country Magazine, 1769, No. 10, Vol 1, October (National Portrait Gallery, London)

After firing his shot at Ray, Hackman pulled out a second pistol and attempted to shoot himself, but the bullet only glanced him and left him wounded. Having failed at his suicide, he attempted to club himself to death with the butt of his pistol, but a crowd swiftly pinned him down and he was later arrested by the Bow Street Runners.

Sandwich was reportedly devastated when her empty carriage arrived at the Admiralty and he was informed of her death, saying "I could have borne anything but this."

Two days after her burial at St Nicolas Church in Elstree, Hertfordshire, on 14 April, Hackman was sentenced to death by hanging. He had pleaded not guilty to the charge of murder, telling the court that he had only ever intended on killing himself. However, the fact that he had been carrying two loaded pistols indicated otherwise and the jury did not even feel the need to retire in order to return their verdict. Hackman's sentence was carried out on 19 April in front of a large crowd in Tyburn, London.

The events surrounding Ray's murder were used in the popular 1780 novel Love and Madness by Herbert Croft.

Ray was buried in a vault under a pew in St Nicholas church, Elstree. During renovations of the church in 1824, the vault was re-discovered and Ray's remains moved to an unmarked grave in the churchyard. In 1920, the then Earl of Sandwich had a tombstone erected over the grave.
