= Anne Fleming and Catherine Jennis =

Anne Fleming (1723 – 16 January 1796) and Catherine Jennis are buried together in their vault in Wiveton parish church in the English county of Norfolk, at the foot of the steps to the communion table.

== Biography ==
At the foot of the steps to the communion table inside the St. Mary's Church in Wiveton, there is the memorial tablet to Anne Fleming. The inscription says: "Near this monument and in the same vault with the remains of her much respected friend Mrs Catherine Jennis is interred the body of Mrs Anne Fleming, spinster, daughter of John Fleming gent and Sarah his wife late of Great Snoring. She died Jan 16th 1796 aged 73. In her were united the true Characters of a pious and charitable Christian and a kind and sincere Friend."

Catherine Jennis is buried near Anne Fleming, and in her memorial you can read: "Here lieth interred the body of Catherine, the wife of Edmund Garrett (died 1712) who departed this life the January 15 in the year of our Lord 1727, aged 61 years. Also Mrs Catherine Jennis, daughter of the aforesand Edmund and Catherine Garrett, she departed this life Dec. 19, 178?, in the 75 year of her age."

Alan Bray suggested that the use of the term "Friend" in this memorial is indication of a particular friendship between Fleming and Jennis, and therefore this is probably an early example of domestic partnership.

Anne Fleming was the daughter of John Fleming (1674–1764) and Sarah Fleming (1693–1759). The Fleming family is buried inside the church of St. Mary Virgin in Great Snoring, while Anne and Catherine are buried in their vault in Wiveton parish church with other relatives of Catherine, from the Garrett family. The two churches are less than 15 miles apart.
