= Sir John Croft, 4th Baronet =

Sir John Croft, 4th Baronet, was the son of Sir Archer Croft, 2nd Baronet and Frances Waring. He died at Bath, Somerset on 4 December 1797, without legitimate issue.

== Baronetage ==
He succeeded to the title of 4th Baronet Croft, of Croft Castle, County Hereford on 30 November 1790 upon the death of his brother, Sir Archer Croft, 3rd Baronet Croft, who had died without male issue.

Baronetage of England
Preceded by Archer Croft Jr.	Baronet (of Croft Castle); 1790–1797	Succeeded by Herbert Croft
