= Sir Herbert Croft, 5th Baronet =

18th/19th-century English writer

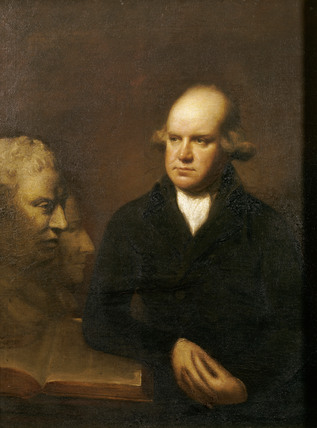
Sir Herbert Croft 5th bt by Lemuel Abbott

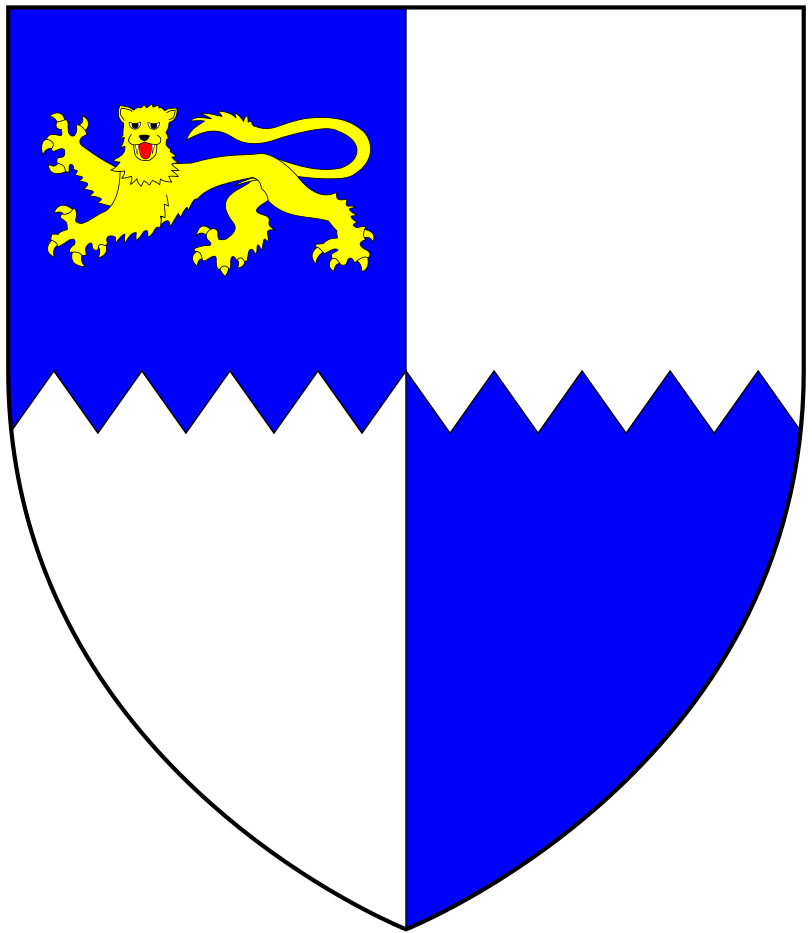
Arms of Croft, of Croft Castle, Herefordshire: Quarterly per fess indented azure and argent, in the 1st quarter a lion passant guardant or

Sir Herbert Croft, 5th Baronet (1 November 1751 – 26 April 1816), English author best known for his novel Love and Madness.

== Life ==
Croft was born at Dunston Park, Berkshire, son of the son of Herbert Croft and Elizabeth Young. He matriculated at University College, Oxford, in March 1771, and was subsequently entered at Lincoln's Inn. He was called to the bar, but in 1782 returned to Oxford with a view to preparing for holy orders. In 1786 he received the vicarage of Prittlewell, Essex, but he remained at Oxford for some years accumulating materials for a proposed English dictionary. Croft spent years on this project and he also took on preparation work made by Joseph Priestley. However, despite compiling thousands of entries not found in other dictionaries, the project was finally abandoned because of a failure to find sufficient subscribers. He was twice married, and on the day after his second wedding day he was imprisoned at Exeter for debt.

He then retired to Hamburg, and two years later his library was sold. He had succeeded in 1797 to the baronetcy, but not to the estates, of a distant cousin, Sir John Croft, 4th Baronet. He returned to England in 1800, but went abroad once more in 1802. He lived near Amiens at a house owned by Lady Mary Hamilton, the daughter of Alexander Leslie, 5th Earl of Leven. Later he removed to Paris, where he died on 26 April 1816.

In some of his numerous literary enterprises he had the help of Charles Nodier. Croft wrote the Life of Edward Young inserted in Samuel Johnson's Lives of the Poets.

In 1780 he published Love and Madness, a Story too true, in a series of letters between Parties whose names could perhaps be mentioned were they less known or less lamented. This book, which passed through seven editions, narrates the passion of the soldier-turned-clergyman James Hackman for Martha Ray, mistress of the earl of Sandwich, who was shot by her lover as she was leaving Covent Garden in 1779 (see the Case and Memoirs of the late Rev. Mr James Hackman, 1779).

Love and Madness has permanent interest because Croft inserted, among other miscellaneous matter, information about Thomas Chatterton gained from letters which he obtained from the poet's sister, Mrs Newton, under false pretences, stealing them from her and used without payment nor permission. Robert Southey, when about to publish an edition of Chatterton's works for the benefit of his family, published (November 1799) details of Croft's proceedings in the Monthly To this attack Croft wrote a reply addressed to John Nichols in the Gentleman's Magazine, and afterwards printed separately as Chatterton and Love and Madness ... (1800).

This tract evades the main accusation, and contains much abuse of Southey. In revealing Croft's villainous acts, Southey and Cottle worked together, with both the desire to help Chatterton's widowed and impoverished sister, and to turn themselves into the primary editors of Chatterton's works.

Croft supplied the material for the exhaustive account of Chatterton in Andrew Kippis's Biographia Britannica (vol. iv., 1789).

In 1788 he addressed a letter to William Pitt on the subject of a new dictionary. He criticized Samuel Johnson's efforts, and in 1790 he claimed to have collected 11,000 words used by excellent authorities but omitted by Johnson. Two years later he issued proposals for a revised edition of Johnson's Dictionary, but subscribers were lacking and his 200 vols. of manuscript remained unused. Croft was a good scholar and linguist, and the author of some curious books in French.

Charles Nodier was working as a secretary to the elderly Croft and his platonic friend, the novelist Lady Mary Hamilton in France. During this time Nodier translated Hamilton's book Munster Village and helped her write La famille du duc de Popoli or The Duc de Popoli which was published in 1810.

The Love Letters of Mr H. and Miss R. 1775–1779 were edited from Croft's book by Mr Gilbert Burgess (1895). See also John Nichols's Illustrations ... (1828), v. 202–218.

Baronetage of England
Preceded by John Croft	Baronet (of Croft Castle); 1797–1816	Succeeded by Dr. Richard Croft
