= John R. Croft =

John R. Croft is a retired brigadier general in the United States Air National Guard and former chief of staff of the Wisconsin Air National Guard.

== Biography ==
Croft graduated from Central Washington University in 1972. As a civilian he has worked as a pilot for American Airlines and has logged more than 13,000 hours flying in a Boeing 727, McDonnell Douglas DC-10, and McDonnell Douglas MD-80.

== Career ==
Croft originally joined the United States Air Force in 1972 before transferring to the Wisconsin Air National Guard in 1979 and joining the 128th Air Refueling Wing. He has acquired more than 3,300 hours flying in a Boeing KC-135 Stratotanker, Cessna T-37 Tweet, and Northrop T-38 Talon. Croft's assignments have included tours of duty in the Gulf War and the Kosovo War.

Awards he has received include the Meritorious Service Medal, the Air Medal, the Aerial Achievement Medal, the Air Force Commendation Medal, the Air Force Outstanding Unit Award with two oak leaf clusters and valor device, the Combat Readiness Medal with silver oak leaf cluster, the Southwest Asia Service Medal with two service stars, the Kuwait Liberation Medal (Saudi Arabia), and the Kuwait Liberation Medal (Kuwait).

He became chief of staff of the Wisconsin Air National Guard in 2001.
