= Lucy Cooper =

18th-Century London Courtesan

- Portrait of Lucy Cooper engraved by James MacArdell after Frans van der Mijn (National Portrait Gallery, London, NPG1615 )
- Born: Lucy Cooper; Circa 1733; Covent Garden, London, England
- Died: 18 October 1772 (aged about 39); Covent Garden, London, England
- Occupation: Courtesan

Lucy Cooper (sometimes Cowper) (circa 1733 - 18 October 1772), was an 18th-century English courtesan. A contemporary of Kitty Fisher, Fanny Murray and Charlotte Hayes, she was one of the most prominent courtesans of her day. She was mistress to Sir Orlando Bridgeman, 4th Baronet and was associated with the Divan Club founded by Francis Dashwood, 11th Baron le Despencer. Her ascendancy, fame and tragic fall into debt and poverty exemplifies the fate of many sex workers in Georgian England.

== Early Life ==
Details of Lucy Cooper's parentage and birth are unclear. It is likely she was born into a poor Covent Garden family in about 1733. According to some accounts her mother was a brothel keeper and Lucy spent her early life selling flowers or working in a tavern. When Lucy was about 14 she was recruited by the notorious bawd Elizabeth Wetherby (also spelled 'Weatherby'), who ran a coffee house named the Ben Johnson's Head (or more commonly 'Wetherby's') in Little Russell Street, near Drury Lane, Covent Garden. William Hickey wrote of Wetherby's in his memoirs:

'Upon ringing at a door, strongly secured with knobs of iron, a cut-throat looking rascal opened a small wicket, which was also secured with narrow iron bars, who in a hoarse and ferocious voice asked: 'Who's there?' Being answered 'Friends' we were cautiously admitted one at a time, and when the last had entered, the door was instantly closed and secured, not only by an immense lock and key, but a massy iron bolt and chain. I had then never been within the walls of a prison, yet this struck me like entering one of the most horrible kind. My companions conducted me into a room where such a scene was exhibiting that I involuntarily shrunk back with disgust and dismay, and would have retreated from the apartment, but that I found that my surprize and alarm were so visible in my countenance as to have attracted the attention of several people who came up, and good naturedly enough encouraged me, observing that I was a young hand but should soon be familiarised and enjoy the fun. At this time the whole room was in an uproar, men and women promiscuously mounted upon chairs, tables and benches, in order to see a sort of general conflict carried on upon the floor. Two she devils, for they scarce had a human appearance, were engaged in a scratching and boxing match, their faces entirely covered with blood, bosoms bare, and clothes nearly torn from their bodies. For several minutes not a creature interfered between them, or seemed to care a straw what mischief they might do each other, and the contest went on with unabated fury.'

Sir Francis Dashwood At His Devotions, after William Hogarth, c 1739 (Sotheby's)

Lucy was lively witty and attractive and was soon the star of Wetherby's establishment; the Nocturnal Revels, a publication on prostitution in Georgian London published in 1779, after Lucy's death, reported her quick tongue ‘was the greatest attraction she possessed’. Hallie Rubenhold writes 'There were no aspirations for Lucy's future though. If nature hadn't blessed her with such overwhelming beauty, it is probable she would have sunk into obscurity along with the others who lodge under her mother's second-rate roof'...'It was only through the insight of Elizabeth Wetherby ... that Lucy was polished and presented, a finished product ripe for high-class whoring in her early teens'. She became the acknowledged successor to Covent Garden's favorite courtesan Betsy Careless who had died in 1752. The author Dan Cruickshank speculates that Lucy may have served as one of the 'nuns' of Sir Francis Dashwood's 'Order of Medmenham' (an earlier incarnation of the Hellfire Club). She was a mistress of John Montagu, 4th Earl of Sandwich, who was also associated with rival courtesan Fanny Murray and with the singer Martha Ray.

== Fame ==
Portrait of Lucy Cooper by Frans van der Mijn (Image from Witt Library, Courtauld Institute of Art )

By the late 1750s Lucy Cooper had become the mistress of Sir Orlando Bridgeman, a well respected lawyer and member of parliament. Sir Orlando's wife had died in 1752 and he installed Lucy in a 'very elegant house he furnished for her in Parliament Street, and kept a chariot for her, which would often be at Wetherby's door for twenty-four, and sometimes eight-and-forty hours successively'. The Nocturnal Revels states that Sir Orlando Bridgeman 'was [so] besotted with Lucy's repartees (for that was the greatest attraction she possessed), that the dotard would have married her, had she not been so generous as to refuse his hand, that she might not bring a scandal upon his family' . The publication adds '... after this relation, the reader may be curious to know what could induce [Lucy Cooper to] frequent such a house of riot and debauchery [Wetherby's], when she might have been far more comfortable at her own hotel. But dissipation was Lucy's motto: the old Baronet she abhorred, at Wetherby's she could meet with Palmer the player (since dead), Bet Weyms, Alexander Stevens, Samuel Derrick, and some more choice geniuses. Her lovers at this time were said to have included the poet Charles Churchill.

Portrait of Lucy Cooper by Frans van der Mijn engraved by John Smith, circa 1750 (British Museum )

Lucy was painted by the well known artist Frans van der Mijn and his portrait of her was widely reproduced whilst she was at the peak of her fame.

Lucy's entry in the 1761 edition of Harris's List of Covent Garden Ladies, the annual directory of prostitutes working in Georgian London published between 1760 and 1794, reads as follows (quoted in Rubenhold,The Covent Garden Ladies: Pimp General Jack & the extraordinary story of Harris's List):

'No body, in the least acquainted with the world of amusement can be a stranger to the accomplishments of the sprightly Lucy [Cooper]. No woman can be a more jovial companion, or say better things. She has often true wit about her; but lards it rather a little too much with blasphemy. She was, to the astonishment of the world, kept for three years by Sir Penurious Trifle [Sir Orlando Bridgeman] who never had before shewn the slightest tendency to extravagance, but once; and that was in giving a guinea instead of a shilling, by mistake to a coachman; which he never demanded, it was because he knew not where to seek for jolt. She is said to have squandered for him 14,000 [pounds] without realising 1400 [pounds]. She is closely connected with an actor at the Old House; and some people say, they have tucked themselves up in the matrimonial noose; but the theatrical legends range this article under the head of apocrypha. Lucy's features are regular, her hair brown, her air easy, and her shape genteel: though she is very thin, her bones are not so sharp as a razor, as a certain noted Templar, lately deceased used to affirm.'

== Decline ==
Enamel etui made in Birmingham circa 1755 decorated with Lucy Cooper's portrait after Frans van der Mijn (from the collection of Nellie Ionides, sold by Christie's May 27, 2022 )

Enamel snuff box with hidden portrait of Lucy Cooper, circa 1755 (from the collection of Nellie Ionides, sold Bonhams, 19 November 2011 )

In 1764, Orlando Bridgeman died and Mrs Wetherby followed in 1765. Edward Thompson wrote in ‘The Meretriciad’ (1765 edition) that Bridgeman left Lucy a generous annuity that would guarantee her future on condition she mended her ways:

'When Bridgeman made his last dear will and groan, A good annuity was then thy own With this proviso - that you'd rake no more Nor play the vagrant mercenary whore. Alas! Thy many actions since have shown Thou could'st not quit the bottle and the town; Oft has the Muse beheld thy tottering feet, And prayed that instant for the widest street'.

Left on her own, Lucy grew wilder and more drunken; she began frequenting that last resort of low whores - Bob Derry’s Cider Cellar in Maiden Lane, described by James Boswell as a 'stinking sore of a public house'' filled with '...the most abandoned of the frail sisterhood, a shameless crowd with painted cheeks and Indian-inked eyebrows, decked out with earrings and necklaces of red and green glass, who filled this foetid tavern from sunset to sunrise.' Thompson records her dissolution in ‘The Meretriciad’:

'Lewder than all the whores in Charles's reign, At famed Bob Derry's where the harlots throng, My muse has listened to thy luscious song, And heard thee swear like worser Drury's Punk, The man should have thee, who could make thee drunk, Cit, soldier, sailor or some bearded Jew In triumph, reeling, bore thee to some stew.'

One evening in 1765 two clients, 'a Bobwig and Beau' were murdered at Bob Derry’s Cider Cellar, and Lucy was held partly to blame for the violence and was arrested and briefly jailed which occasioned the following elegy: Fat Wetherby's sunk now in eternal sleep; weep, weep, my Lucy, Wetherby's no more...' On her release it is said that Lucy opened up a bagnio on Bond Street in Mayfair but the venture failed - in part because drinking and dissipation had destroyed her health, her looks and her charm. Lucy sold her furniture, her jewels and her silver to maintain herself but to no avail and in 1769, she was overcome by debt and was imprisoned in the King's Bench Prison. Thompson in ‘The Meretriciad’ comments:

Usher, Orlando, Wetherby, are gone, In dismal Sackcloth...But O! My luscious dissipated Wench; How come ye lately to the close King's Bench

She wrote a begging letter, as reported by William Hickey, 'stating that she was almost naked and starving, without a penny in her pocket to purchase food, raiment, or a coal to warm herself '. Hickey and others raised fifty pounds for her which enabled her to survive and, eventually, leave the gaol. She found rooms in Bow Street where she attempted to resume her business but her health continued to decline and she died in poverty in October 1772 aged in her late 30s.

== In popular culture ==
Satirical engraving from 1778 attacking John Wesley as a Jacobite and 'an old lecher'. Lucy Cooper's portrait hangs on the wall inscribed 'Converted June 24 at 1 O'Clock in the Morning'. The dedication on the engraving states Lucy was 'a Lady still remembered in Covent Garden' six years after her death (British Museum ).

Lucy Cooper, like her rivals Kitty Fisher and Fanny Murray, was an 18th Century Pin-up girl. She dressed in the height of fashion and her face appeared on luxury objects such as enamel snuff boxes and etuis - sold by London jewellers as love tokens.

A popular song bore her name and she was the subject of singularly lewd verses in the Gentleman's Bottle Companion. It is said that 'Lucy Locket' in the children's rhyme is based on Lucy Cooper and her rivalry with fellow courtesan Kitty Fisher:

Lucy Locket lost her pocket,
Kitty Fisher found it;
Not a penny was there in it,
Only ribbon round it.
