= Charlotte Ward =

Charlotte Ward may refer to:

- Charlotte Ward (orienteer) (born 1992), British orienteering competitor
- Charlotte Blakeney Ward (1873–1962), English artist
- Charlotte Bickersteth Ward (1822–1896), British writer
- Charlotte Ward, pen name of Marion Chesney (1936–2019), Scottish writer of romance and mystery novels
- Charlotte Hayes (c. 1725–1813), brothel keeper, also known as Charlotte Ward
