= Charlotte Bickersteth =

Charlotte Bickersteth may refer to:

- Charlotte Bickersteth Mayor (1792–1846), British missionary and mother of Joseph Bickersteth Mayor and John E. B. Mayor
- Charlotte Bickersteth Ward (1882-1896), British religious writer
- Charlotte Bickersteth Wheeler (1818-1884), British religious writer
