= Fanny Murray =

18th-century English courtesan

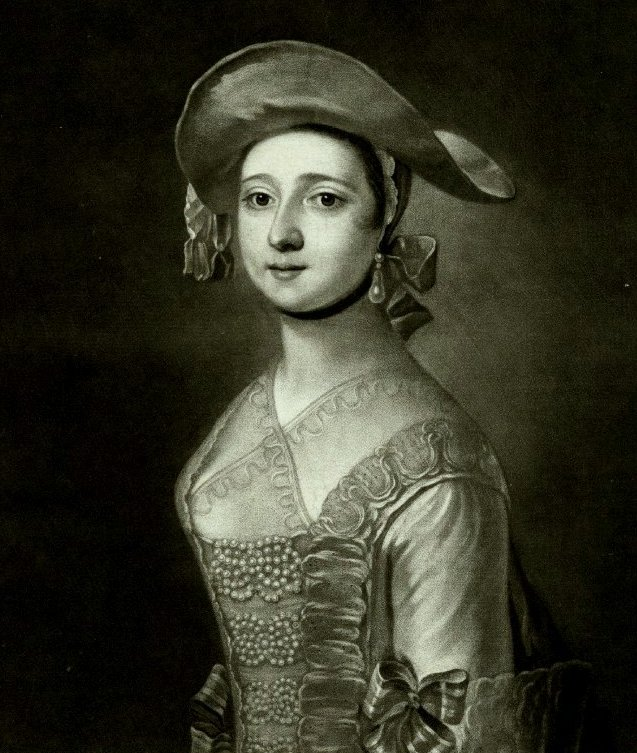
A mezzotint of Fanny Murray from a painting by Henry Robert Morland

Fanny Murray (c. 1729 in Bath – 2 April 1778 in London (Note: Some sources give her date of death as 1770. Nevertheless, notices of her death only appear in gazettes from 1778.)), née Fanny Rudman and later Fanny Ross, was an 18th-century English courtesan, mistress to John Montagu, 4th Earl of Sandwich and dedicatee of the fateful Essay on Woman (1763) that led to the downfall of John Wilkes. A contemporary of Kitty Fisher, Lucy Cooper and Charlotte Hayes, the "celebrated Fanny Murray" was one of the most prominent courtesans of her day; a celebrity and fashion leader who rose from destitution to wealth and fame, before settling down into a life of "respectable prosperity". The Memoirs of the Celebrated Miss Fanny Murray are one of the first examples of the "whore's memoir" genre of writing, although they are unlikely to have been actually written by Murray.

== Early life ==
Sir Francis Dashwood At His Devotions, after William Hogarth, c 1739 (the 'halo' above Dashwood's head is thought by some to represent John Montagu, 4th Earl of Sandwich) Sotheby's

Sir Francis Dashwood At His Devotions, after William Hogarth, c 1739 (the 'halo' above Dashwood's head is thought by some to represent John Montagu, 4th Earl of Sandwich)

The details of her life are not clear, coming as they do from often biased sources such as the Memoirs attributed to her. Most sources agree that Murray was born in Bath in 1729 to a musician called "Rudman", a friend of the influential dandy Beau Nash. Orphaned at age 12, she worked as a flower girl until she was seduced by John Spencer, a grandson of John Churchill, 1st Duke of Marlborough. According to her memoir, she had become a mistress to Beau Nash by 1743, at the age of just fourteen, and soon moved to London, where she became a "dress-lodger" — an indentured prostitute who had to work to pay for the expensive clothes that she wore to solicit customers. Once she had paid off her indenture, Fanny continued as a prostitute under her own employ, but remained in poverty. While she was in London, she was noticed by Jack Harris, a famous pimp from Covent Garden and later co-author of Harris's List of Covent Garden Ladies, a list of prostitutes that Harris claimed were free of venereal disease. Harris supposedly had a surgeon examine Murray to verify her claims that she was free of disease, and made her pay a £20 deposit on the accuracy of her information. Although she had been working in London for many years, she appeared in Harris's guide as a "new face", described as "fit for high keeping with a Jew merchant".

== Fame ==
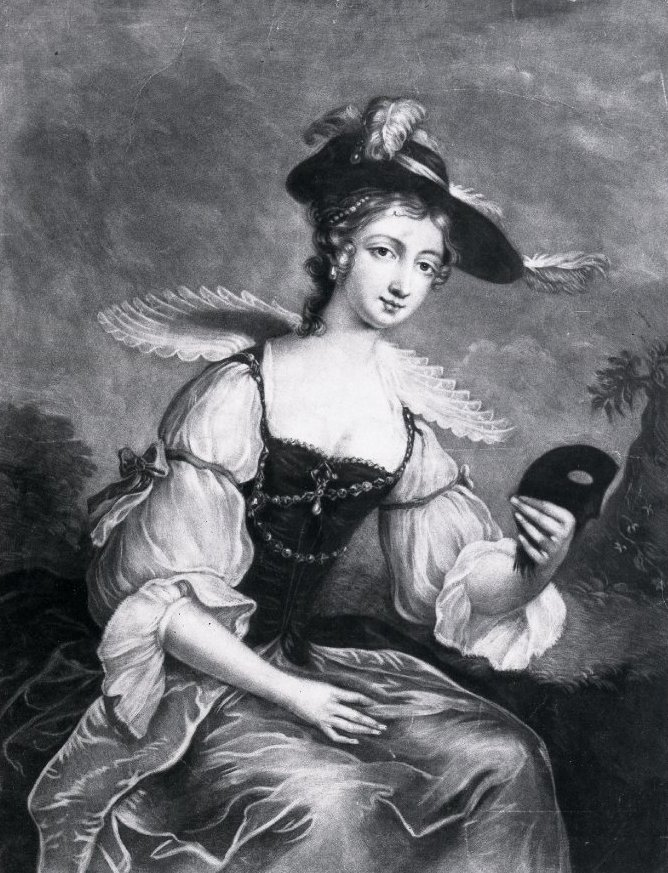
Fanny Murray c. 1750 in a "Vandyke" fancy dress for a masquerade ball, wearing a heavily adorned "Fanny Murray cap" and a low-cut dress, engraved by Thomas Johnson after Thomas Ross.(British Museum)

With the support of Harris, Murray quickly rose to the top of the London demimonde. At just 17, she was famous and widely desired; one diary from the day records that "it was a vice not to be acquainted with Fanny; it was a crime not to toast her at every meal." She is even mentioned in the memoirs of Giacomo Casanova as the guest of honour at a party held by the British Ambassador to Venice, John Murray (no relation) at his casino, and it has been suggested that she is at least in part an inspiration for Fanny Hill, which was published in 1749 at the height of her fame. She became mistress to a string of leading British politicians and celebrities, while her fashion sense — in particular, the broad-brimmed "Fanny Murray cap", supposedly invented to hide the imperfections of her "handsome though somewhat awry" face — became all the rage on the London scene. Her influence on the fashion of the era went so far that one essayist complained:

"If Fanny Murray chuses to vary the fashion of her apparel, immediately every Lucretia in town takes notice of the change, and modestly copies the chaste original. If Fanny shews the coral centre of her snowy orbs—miss, to outstrip her, orders the stays to be cut an inch or two lower; and kindly displays the whole lovely circumference"

There is evidence that Fanny furnished her home conventionally and in refined taste. The surviving account books of the artist and art dealer Arthur Pond record that on July 15, 1748, Pond sold Fanny three framed and glazed engravings from his famous series of Roman Antiquities. The prints engraved by Johann Sebastian Müller were large cappriccios of well-known buildings and antiquities in Rome taken from paitings by Giovanni Paolo Pannini - a favorite with aristocrats who had made the Grand Tour. Fanny paid 2s 3d per engraving and a 8s to frame each.

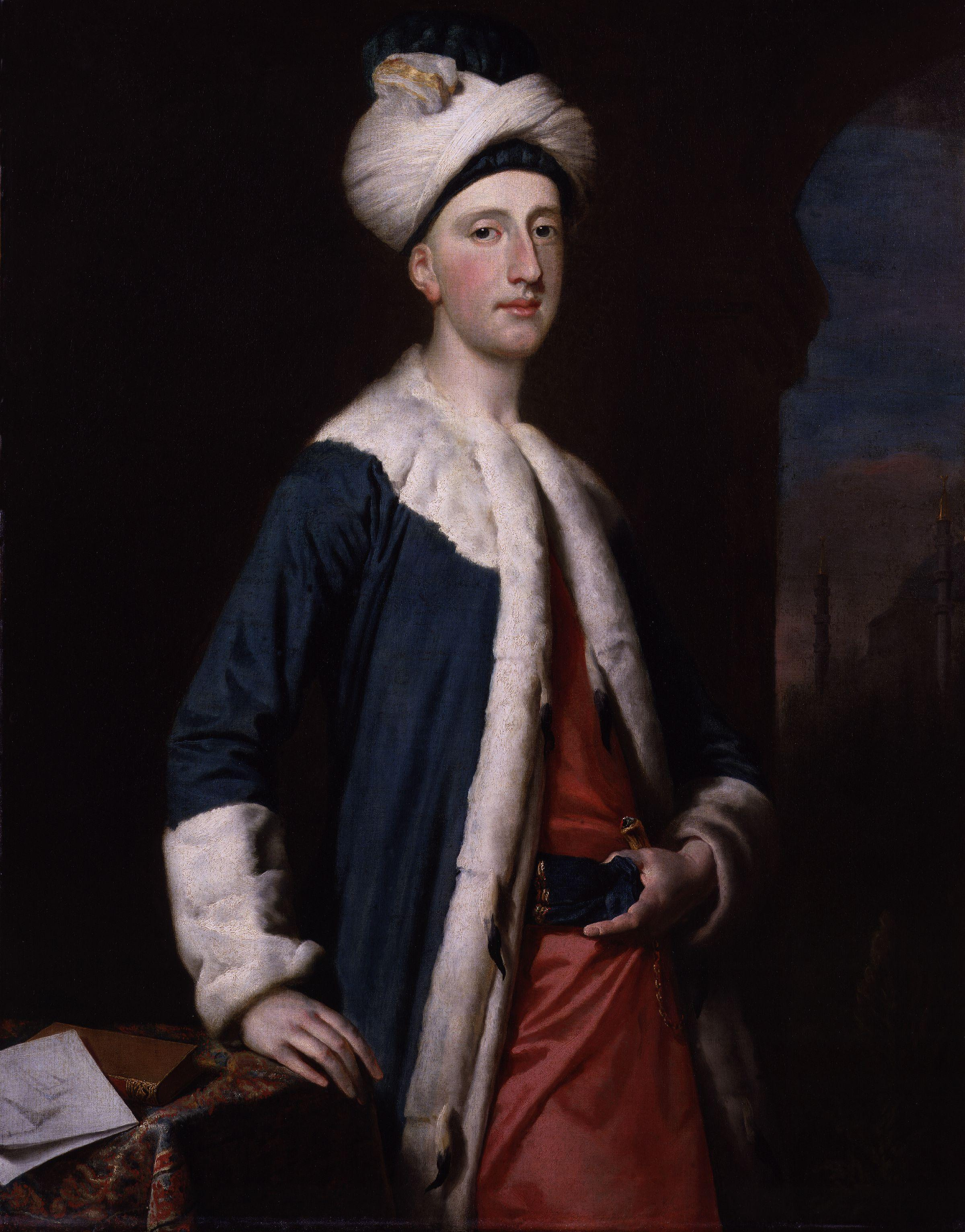
John Montagu, 4th Earl of Sandwich in Istanbul, c. 1740. Sandwich's interest in the Middle East led him to found the Divan Club.

For a long time, she was the mistress of John Montagu, 4th Earl of Sandwich, who was so deeply enamoured of her as to hang a large nude portrait of Murray in his apartment, proudly showing it to guests. Murray often appeared as a "nun" — a female guest — at the orgies of the Hellfire Club, a secret society with satanic trappings which Sandwich regularly attended, and it is also likely that she was a member of the "harem" at the Divan Club, an orientalist group founded by Sandwich that was exclusive to noblemen who had visited the Ottoman Empire.

Eventually she married Sir Richard Atkins, 6th Baronet. A famous anecdote about Murray tells that one night, she complained to him that she lacked money. He gave her a £20 note, (Note: Roughly equivalent to £2,000 in 2011 using the RPI.) to which she declared "damn your twenty pound, what does it signify?", promptly placing the note between two pieces of bread and eating it. The same story was later told of Kitty Fisher — possibly due to Casanova confusing Atkins's mistresses — and Sophia Baddeley. Her marital life appears to have been temperamental, and neither remained entirely monogamous. Atkins died suddenly in 1756 when Murray was just 27, leaving her heavily indebted.

== An Essay on Woman and later life ==
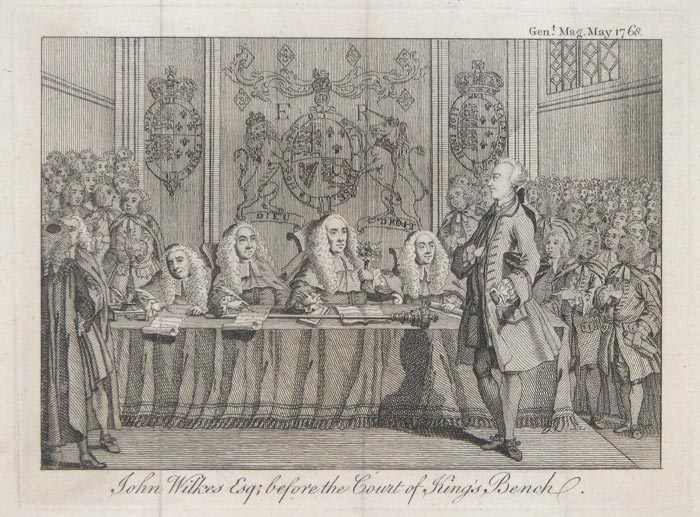
John Wilkes before the Court of King's Bench, accused of obscene libel for writing An Essay on Woman

Unable to pay her debts, Murray was sent to a sponging-house. There, she learned that John Spencer, 1st Earl Spencer, son of the John Spencer who had seduced her, was getting married. She sent him a begging letter informing him of his father's deeds, and manipulated the couple into paying her a £200 per year stipend. Spencer also introduced her to the actor David Ross, whom she married some time around 1757. A biography, purportedly a memoir although written in the third person, appeared in 1759, alongside the similar Uncommon Adventures of Miss Kitty F****r, a thinly disguised roman à clef about Kitty Fisher in which Murray appears as the Spanish prostitute "Miss Murrio".

In 1763, a pornographic poem supposedly composed by John Wilkes surfaced. The poem, a parody of Alexander Pope's An Essay on Man called An Essay on Woman, was dedicated to Murray and featured her extensively: the very first line of the poem reads "Awake, my Fanny", (Note: In some versions, this line is "Awake, my Sandwich" instead.) and one passage compares her to the Virgin Mary, finding that Murray is the better of the two for never having had a child. The poem was likely around a decade old, having been composed at the height of Murray's fame. Wilkes was only in his late teens at that time, and it is possible the poem was written by Thomas Potter, his friend and fellow Hellfire member, rather than Wilkes himself. Despite having been her lover, Sandwich seized on the chance to shame Wilkes, against whom he had borne a grudge ever since Wilkes had leapt out and scared Sandwich during a drunken séance at the Hellfire Club.

Staffordshire enamel snuff box decorated with portrait of Fanny Murray, circa 1760 (formerly collection Nellie Ionides)

Sections of the poem were read out in the House of Lords, which found it blasphemous and obscene. Already accused of seditious libel for criticising the king in The North Briton, Wilkes fled the country and was expelled in absentia from the House and branded an outlaw. Although Murray was not the target of the poem — one biography of Wilkes described her

presence in the poem as "little more than a matter of literary convention" — the event caused considerable distress to Murray, and strained her marriage with Ross. It was public knowledge that Sandwich had been Fanny Murray's lover, and the hypocrisy of his actions were not lost on the public. Records from the era suggest that the very next night, Sandwich went to see The Beggar's Opera, which featured a similar act of betrayal by the character "Jemmy Twitcher". Quickly, the name Twitcher became associated with him.

Despite the turmoil of her later years, Murray's marriage to Ross appears to have been a happy, monogamous one. When an anonymous poem besmirching Ross as an actor appeared, Murray offered twenty guineas (£21) of her own savings to anyone who could find the author. Records from the day universally praise Murray as faithful: a biography of Ross remarks that "whatever her former indiscretions had been, [Murray] conducted herself as a wife with exemplary prudence and discretion". The couple remained married until her death in 1778.

== Images of Fanny Murray ==
Print depicting Fanny Murray, published by Richard Bennet, 1754 (Victoria and Albert Museum )

Watch-paper with a portrait of Fanny Murray with a surround of burning hearts, John June (British Museum, )

Fanny Murray, mezzotint by Richard Houston circa 1760 (British Museum )

The morning tast; or Fanny M-'s maid washing her toes, George Bickham the Younger (British Museum ). Satire on Fanny Murray, seen at her toilette with a hairdresser curling her hair and a maid washing her feet using a chamber pot as a basin.

Chinese Export School, 18th Century, portrait of Fanny Murray (Sotheby's)

Fanny Murray, Portrait for the Divan Club (West Wycombe Park), 1740s
