= David Ross (actor, born 1728) =

British actor and theatre owner

David Ross (1 May 1728 – 14 September 1790) was a British actor and theatre owner. After early appearances in Dublin, he appeared in London at Drury Lane and Covent Garden, and in Edinburgh, where as actor-manager he built a theatre.

== Early life and career ==
Ross, born in London, was the son of a Writer to The Signet in Edinburgh, who settled in London in 1722 as a solicitor of appeals. He was educated at Westminster School, and some indiscretion committed there when he was thirteen years old lost him the affection, never regained, of his father, who, in his will, left instructions to Elizabeth Ross to pay her brother annually, on his birthday, the sum of one shilling "to put him in mind of his misfortune he had to be born". Ross appealed against this will in 1769, and, after carrying the case to the House of Lords, obtained nearly £6,000. How he lived after his father's abandonment is not known.

He played Clerimont in Henry Fielding's The Miser at Smock Alley Theatre, Dublin, in May 1749, and remained there for two more seasons. Engaged with Henry Mossop by David Garrick, he made his first appearance at Drury Lane in London in October 1751 as Young Bevil in The Conscious Lovers, by Richard Steele. The part suited him: "His person was pleasing, and his address easy, his manner of speaking natural, his action well adapted to the gravity as well as grace of the character. He was approved by a polite and distinguishing audience, who seemed to congratulate themselves on seeing an actor whom they imagined capable of restoring to the stage the long-lost character of the real fine gentleman". (Thomas Davies, Life of Garrick, i. 195, ed. 1808). He sprang into immediate favour, and is said, with Mossop, to have inspired some jealousy in Garrick.In 1753 he appeared in the title role of Thomas Southerne's play Oroonoko. In February 1754 he was the original Icilius in Samuel Crisp's Virginia.

On 3 Oct. 1757 he made, in his favourite character of Essex in Henry Jones's The Earl of Essex, his first appearance at Covent Garden. He remained here until 1767, playing leading parts in tragedy and comedy. Few original parts were assigned to him at Covent Garden. The principal were Sifroy in Robert Dodsley's Cleone in December 1758, Lord Belmont in The Double Mistake by Elizabeth Griffith in January 1766, and Don Henriquez in Thomas Hull's The Perplexities in January 1767.

== Theatre Royal, Edinburgh ==
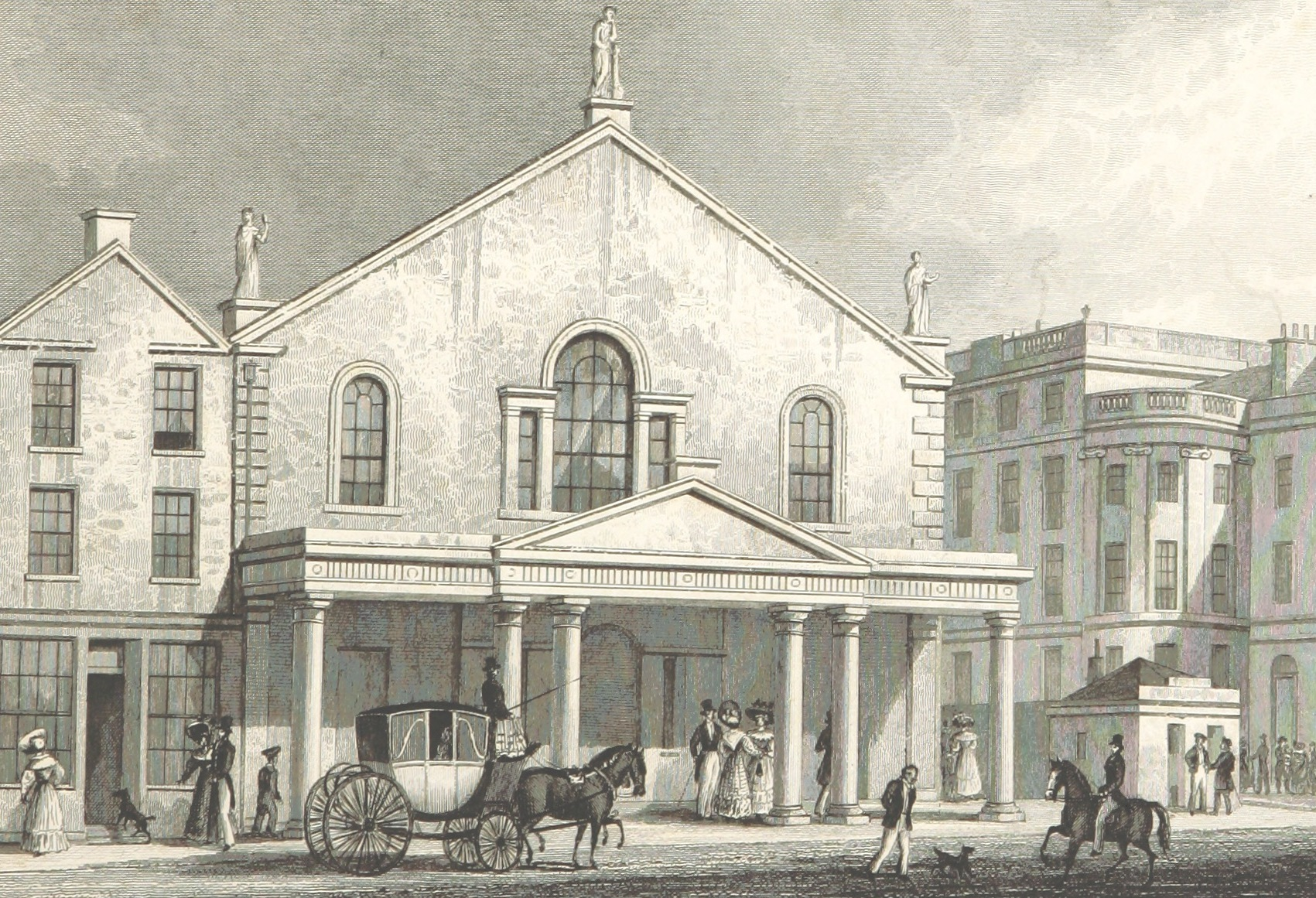
Theatre Royal, Edinburgh

At the end of the season of 1766–7 he left Covent Garden for Edinburgh. In 1767, after popular tumult and violent opposition, a patent was obtained for a patent theatre in the city. This was the first licensed theatre in Scotland. The cost of the theatre, £2,500, was raised by 25 subscribers paying £100 each and receiving 3% of profits per annum in return, and free entry to all performances. Ticket prices varied from 1s to 4s. The final cost including fixtures and fittings was £5000 when it opened in December 1769. A full house would generate £140 per night.

Ross solicited the post of patentee and manager, and, although he was personally unknown in Edinburgh, the theatre was made over to him in the autumn of 1767. He is said to have paid a rental of £400 a year. A strong and influential opposition to Ross as "an improper person" originated, and led to a paper warfare. He nevertheless opened the "old" theatre in the Canongate on 9 December 1767, playing Essex in The Earl of Essex, which is noteworthy as being the first play legally performed in Scotland.

Two years later, on 9 December 1769, he opened, with The Conscious Lovers, a new theatre at Edinburgh, the Theatre Royal. He had succeeded, in spite of innumerable difficulties, in raising the building by subscription, but seems to have had inadequate capital to work it. At the close of a disastrous season he let it to Samuel Foote at a cost of 500 guineas per year, and returned to London. Foote was somewhat unhappy and sold the lease on the Messrs West, Digges and Bland, who revived the profitability by use of "Mrs Hartley".

The second season began on 17 November 1770 with Ross's own work, "The Commissary". From 24 November they produced "The Mirror" in which George Whitefield was parodied under the name of Dr Squintum.

The position of the theatre was greatly enhanced by the completion of North Bridge, which linked the theatre to the main population in the Old Town. However, North Bridge collapsed in August 1769 shortly before the theatre opened, greatly frustrating access to its location. The bridge was not reopened until 1772.

In 1781 the Theatre Royal was purchased by a Mr John Jackson, who in 1793 was author of "A History of the Scottish Stage".

== Return to London ==
In October 1770 Ross reappeared at Covent Garden as Essex, this being announced as his first appearance for four years, and resumed at once his old characters. After a season or two, during which he was seen as Sciolto and Alcanor in Voltaire's Mahomet, his name became infrequent on the bill. After the season of 1777–8 he had the misfortune to break his leg, and he did not reappear on the stage. He was for some years in extreme poverty. An unknown friend, subsequently discovered to be Admiral Samuel Barrington, made him an annual present of £60, which was continued until his death. He died in London on 14 September 1790, and was buried three days later in St James's Church, Piccadilly, James Boswell being chief mourner.

He is said, at the instance of Lord Spencer, to have married, with an allowance of £200 a year, the courtesan Fanny Murray, who "had been debauched" by Lord Spencer's father.

== Commentary ==
John Joseph Knight wrote: "He was a good actor, his great success being 'in tragic characters of the mixed passions'. He was, in his youth, a fashionable exponent of lovers in genteel comedy, but forfeited those characters through indolence and love of pleasure.... He was said to be the last pupil of Quin, whose Falstaffian qualities he perpetuated.... His extravagance kept him in constant trouble. He was a good story-teller and boon companion, and made many influential friends in Scotland and in England."
