= William Paget (actor) =

English actor and author

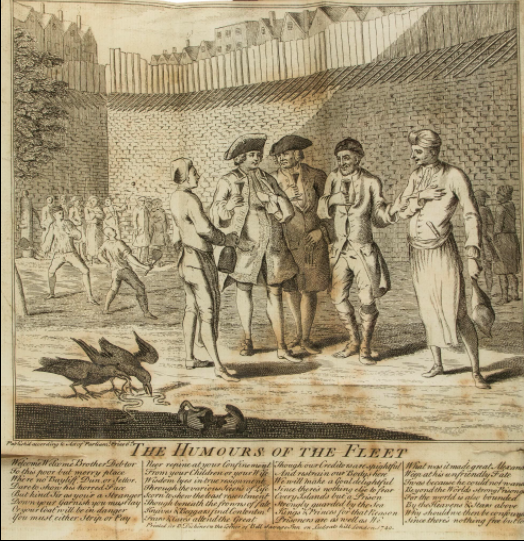
Fleet Prison – front piece for Paget's The Humours of the Fleet

William Paget (died 23 March 1752) was an English actor and writer in the 18th century who played alongside David Garrick and was a member of John Rich's company, playing in the first season of Theatre Royal, Covent Garden (1732). He was also an eminent tobacconist on Fleet Street, London. Toward the end of his life he served time in Fleet Prison, writing the poem "The Humours of the Fleet" among others. He then agreed to participate in the establishment of Halifax, Nova Scotia, dying there in 1752.

== Career ==
His father, "the son of Dance", was a mason and architect and is reported to have built Buckingham House (which would become Buckingham Palace).

In 1730 Paget was cast as Mirza in the first Masonic opera, the libretto written by William Rufus Chetwood, entitled The Generous Freemason; or, The Constant Lady. With Humours of Squire Noodle and his Man Doodle. The opera was performed at Oates and Henry Fielding's Great Theatrical Booth at the George Inn Yard in Smithfield, during the time of Bartholomew Fair. He also played at Southwark Fair.

In the same year, 27 June 1730, Paget played Othello at Haymarket, having arrived from the theatre of Dublin.

In the 1730–1731 season, he joined the Drury Lane company, when he played Peachum in John Gay's Beggar's Opera. He played in John Rich's company for the 1731–1733 seasons at Lincoln's Inn Fields Theatre and later Covent Garden.

In 1733–1734 he returned to Drury Lane.

=== Henry Giffard's Company, Goodman's Fields Theatre ===
After that he played Covent Garden, the Haymarket, Lincoln's Inn Fields Theatre, Goodman's Fields Theatre, and at Richmond and Dublin. At Goodman's he played Longman in Henry Giffard's (1694–1772) play Pamela: A comedy, etc..

In 1736–37, Paget played Duke of Albany in King Lear at Covent Garden.

In June 1741, Henry Giffard took a small group of actors to present a summer season at Tunkard Street Theatre, Ipswich. Both Paget and Garrick (the latter just joined the company at age 24) were part of the company. Paget wrote A Voyage to Ipswich to open the plays, which includes a commemoration of Admiral Edward Vernon and his victory at Battle of Porto Bello.

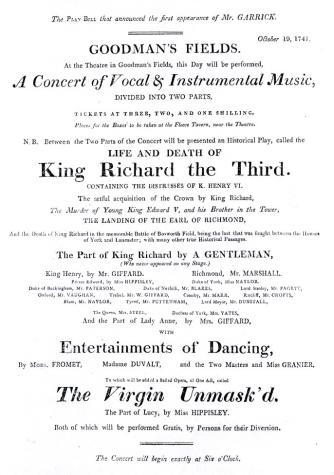
Facsimile of Playbill (c. 1800) from Garrick's debut as Richard III, Paget playing Lord Stanley

In October 1741, Paget played Lord Stanley in Richard III, which marked the rise to fame of David Garrick in the lead role.

In November 1741, Paget played Judge Guttle in David Garrick's own play The Lying Valet.

In 1742, Paget played Gripe the miser in John Hippisley and Thomas Chapman's play Scaramouch scapin, or the Old Miser Caught in a Sack. With the Comical Tricks, Shifts and Chests of Scapin's Three Companions.

In 1742 and returning to the role in 1746, Paget played Earl of Kent in King Lear, with Garrick playing King Lear.

=== John Rich's Company, Covent Garden ===
Under John Rich's management, in June 1746 at Covent Garden Paget played Polonius in Hamlet opposite Garrick who played Hamlet and Edward Shuter who played the grave digger.

In October 1746, Paget played Alonzo in Giffard's production of Revenge; he also played again in The Lying Valet and in Henry IV, Part 1, as Falstaff.

In November 1748, at Covent Garden, he played Shallow in a production of Merry Wives of Windsor.

In March 1749, at Covent Garden Paget played in Henry IV, as Mowbray.

== Halifax ==
Paget eventually was imprisoned in a sponging-house because of debt. He then was sent to Fleet Prison in London and later released because of the Insolvent Debtors Relief, etc. Act 1747 c. 33. The following year he published The Humours of the Fleet, the title being a play on both The Rules of the Fleet and James Miller's popular play The Humours of Oxford. Along with many other English immigrants, Paget then moved to Halifax to escape his debt. Paget died soon after he arrived (1752), leaving his wife and four children.

== Publications ==
- A Voyage to Ipswich. 1744
- The Humours of the Fleet. 1749
