= Jane Douglas =

18th century London brothel-keeper

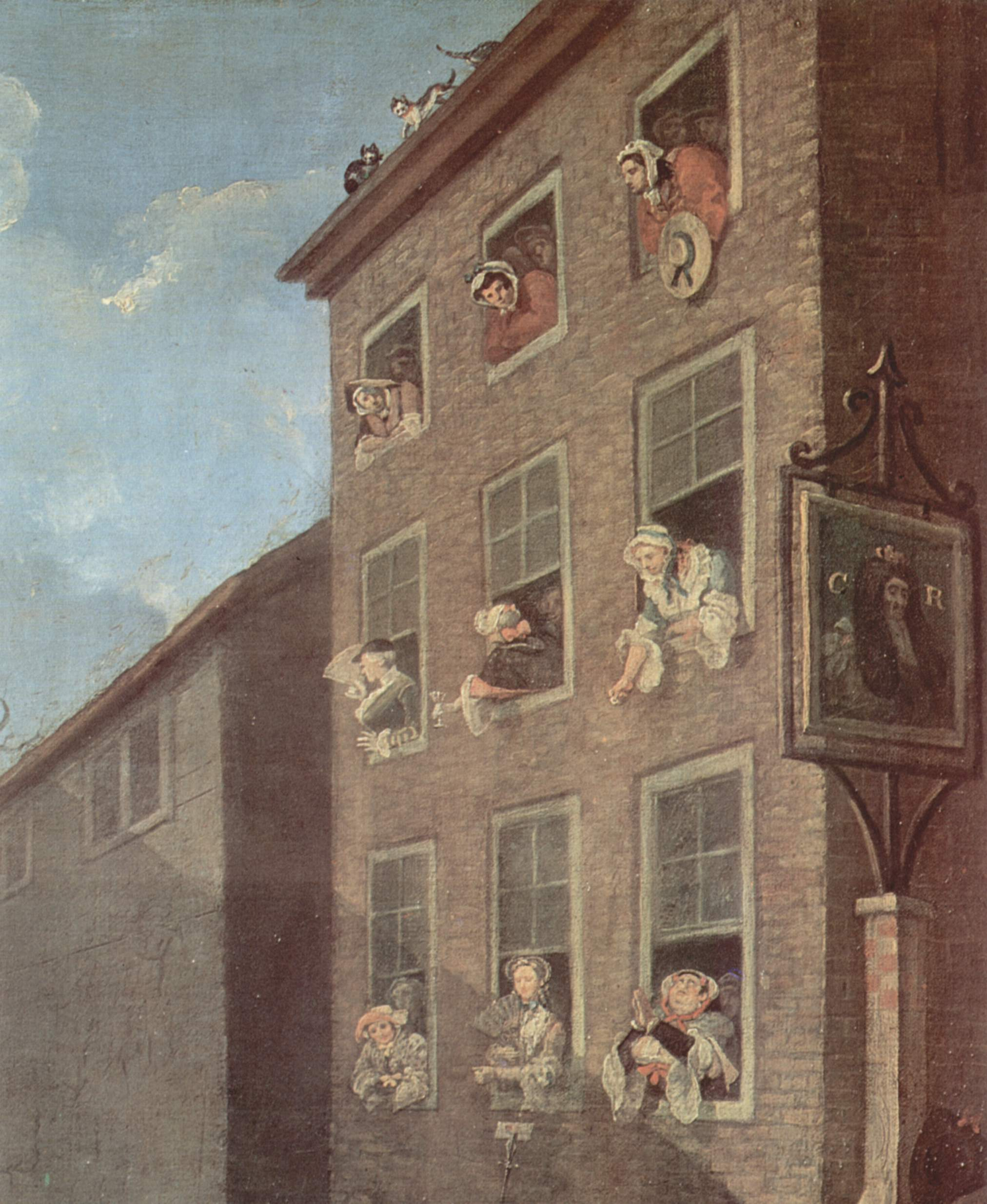
- Detail from Hogarth's The March of the Guards to Finchley, 1745 showing Douglas in the window at the bottom right praying for the safe return of her "Babes of Grace". Douglas' girls line the other windows, and the cats on the roof indicate the house is a "cattery"; the signboard shows King Charles
- Born: c.1698 Edinburgh, Scotland
- Died: 10 June 1761; London, England, Kingdom of Great Britain
- Other name: Mother Douglas
- Occupation: Brothel-keeper

Jane Douglas (c. 1698 – 10 June 1761), commonly known as Mother Douglas, was a brothel-keeper in mid-18th century London. Known at the time as "The Empress of the Bawds", her house in Covent Garden attracted customers from the higher echelons of society.

== Early career ==
Mother Douglas was born around 1698 or 1704 to a well-to-do Edinburgh family named Marin(e). She had three sisters and at least one brother, but nothing more is known of the family. By the time she was 17, she was already working as a prostitute in London under the name Douglas. She worked out of a house in St James's, Piccadilly and was praised by John Gay as "that inimitable Courtesan". She was on intimate terms with many influential people, both men and women, but had a particularly close friendship with John Williams (later 1st Earl FitzWilliam). At some point she took possession of the St James's house and began to work as a procuress, choosing girls for their elegance, pleasant manners, and sexual expertise.

== Covent Garden ==
By 1735, she had moved to Covent Garden, home to many of the famous brothels of the time. She took a house in the Little Piazza, to the east of the main piazza on the corner of Russell Street, that had recently been vacated by Betty Careless. As she had done in St James's, she decorated the house in opulent style and hired liveried servants to wait on her customers. The Covent Garden location meant that customers were plentiful. It also had the advantage of being close to the theatres; these supplied a continual flow of beautiful, but poor, actresses—who would supplement their incomes by working for Douglas. The customers coming from the many drinking dens and bagnios that surrounded the square were often drunk and rowdy. This led to disturbances at the house, and occasional raids and arrests.

In 1741, Douglas moved to the opposite side of the square into the vacant King's Head. This house was much larger, with a garden and running water supplied to the basement. Douglas made further improvements, installing a drain and cesspool, extending the water supply, and renovating the roof, chimneys, and staircases. This house was decorated to the highest standards with fine furniture, china, glass, and expensive paintings adorning the walls. She added a restaurant with liveried waiters to serve the guests. As well as paying high prices to enjoy the luxurious surroundings and hand-picked girls of her establishment, her patrons were able to take advantage of condoms manufactured by Jacobs in the Strand, presented in a silk bag and with a hefty markup. For those suffering from syphilis, she supplied Dr. Jean Misaubin's pillule.

According to the Nocturnal Revels, her customers included "Prince, Peers and men of the Highest Rank". Prince William, Duke of Cumberland was a frequent visitor and presented her with some silver plate. William Hogarth often sketched in her house and featured her praying from the window of her house in The March of the Guards to Finchley and again in Enthusiasm Delineated. Her house was also popular with army officers on leave and the captains of the East Indiamen.

She attempted to maintain an honest house, discharging girls if they were caught stealing, but from time to time she fell afoul of the Society for the Reformation of Manners, in the person of Sir John Gonson and his anti-vice patrols, and was arrested. On most of these occasions she escaped with a fine, or by bribery escaped punishment completely, but she did once or twice have to spend time in prison.

== Decline and death ==
Around 1746, her fortunes took a turn for the worse. Her house fell out of fashion with high society and a lower class of customer began to patronise the establishment. Douglas herself became pregnant; the child was thought to be Lord Fitzwilliam's and was the subject of much debate, although Rear Admiral Charles Holmes, another of Douglas' lovers, later turned out to be the father. Additionally, Douglas' health was beginning to fail.

By 1759, she was unable to continue business, and the lease on the King's Head passed to a relative, Amelia Douglas. Jane was described as "much bloated by Drink and Debauch...her Legs swelled out of shape...suffering great discomfort". She died on 10 June 1761 leaving a considerable estate. The contents of her house were sold off by her friend, the auctioneer Abraham Langford. Although there was a genuine Mother Cole, Douglas supposedly forms the prototype for Mother Cole in John Cleland's Fanny Hill, and together with Langford, those of Mrs. Cole and Mr. Smirk in Samuel Foote's The Mirror.
