= Henry Jones (poet) =

Henry Jones (1721–1770), born in Ireland, was a poet and dramatist active in London.

== Life ==
Jones was born at Beaulieu, near Drogheda, County Louth, in 1721. He was apprenticed to a bricklayer, but contrived to study privately. Some complimentary verses which he addressed to the corporation of Drogheda and some lines "On Mr. Pope's Death", attracted the attention of Lord-chief-justice Singleton, who lived at Beaulieu.

In 1745 he obtained employment in the reparation of the parliament house at Dublin, Jones celebrated the arrival of Lord Chesterfield as lord-lieutenant of Ireland in a poem which was presented to Chesterfield by Singleton. Chesterfield rewarded Jones liberally, and, at his request, Jones followed him to London in 1748. With the assistance of Chesterfield and his friends, Jones published by subscription Poems on Several Occasions, 8vo, London, 1749, from which he derived a handsome profit. He finished about the end of 1752 his tragedy, The Earl of Essex. Chesterfield warmly commended it to Colley Cibber. The latter introduced Jones to the manager of Covent Garden Theatre, and showed his regard for him by making efforts at court to secure the laureateship for Jones after his own death.

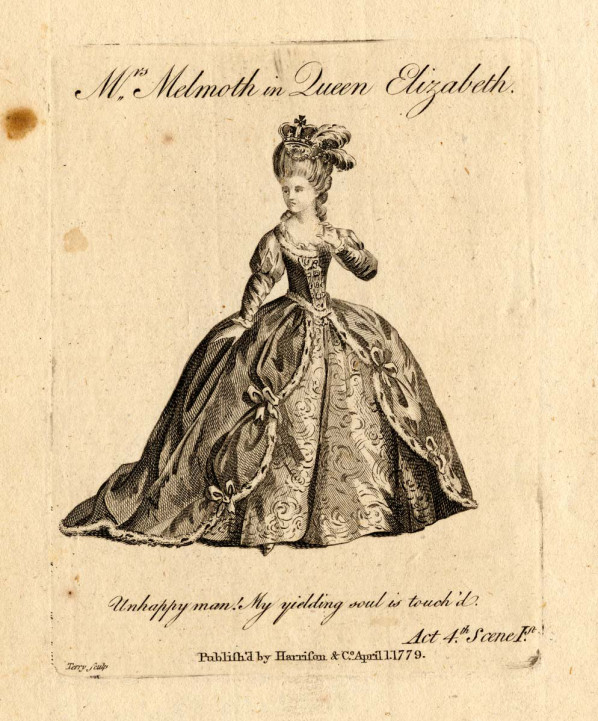
Charlotte Melmoth as Queen Elizabeth in Jones' "The Earl of Essex" 1779.

The tragedy, after being carefully revised by Chesterfield and Cibber, was brought out at Covent Garden on 21 Feb. 1753, and, thanks to the fine acting of Spranger Barry in the title role, was played seventeen nights during the season to crowded houses (John Genest, History of the Stage, iv. 370–1, 374, 421). It met with equal success in Dublin and the provinces. Jones's benefits brought him £500. The play was printed soon after its production, and reached a fourth edition in 1770. However, it is of poor literary quality.

The success ruined Jones, and he took to irregular courses. His drunken habits, indolence, coarse manners, and arrogant temper soon disgusted most of his patrons, though by a carefully regulated system of hypocrisy he continued to keep on terms with Chesterfield for some years longer. At length he offended him by borrowing money of his servant. He had at that time made some progress with a tragedy called Harold, and on that doubtful security managed to raise money from the booksellers. His relations with some of the leading actors were still friendly. He sponged freely on minor actors, whom in his drunken fits he would denounce as 'parrots', but he repaid them with puffs and panegyrics before their benefits. He composed a prologue for Husbands, paid some poetical compliments to Barry on his Hamlet, and wrote a eulogy on Margaret Woffington.

When an inmate of sponging-houses he generally contrived to flatter the daughter or wife of the bailiff with verses on their beauty or talents, and thus secured comfortable quarters. His misfortunes at last excited the pity of the master of the Bedford Coffee-house, Covent Garden, who gave him free board and lodging. He left his room unobserved early one morning, and, after being in a state of intoxication for two days, was run over by a wagon in St Martin's Lane. He died in the parish workhouse in April 1770.

== Works ==
Reddish, the actor of Drury Lane, obtained all Jones's manuscripts, which included 'Harold' and three acts of another tragedy called 'The Cave of Idra.' The last-named drama was augmented and completed by Paul Hiffernan, and, under the title of 'The Heroine of the Cave,' was produced for Reddish's benefit on 25 March 1774 (ib. v. 450). It was printed in the following year. The fate of 'Harold' is unknown (Baker, Biog. Dram. ed. 1812, ii. 284-5).

Jones wrote also:

- Philosophy : a Poem address'd to the Ladies who attend Mr. Booth's Lectures. By the Bricklayer, 8vo, Dublin, 1746.
- An Epistle to the . . . Earl of Orrery, occasion'd by reading his Lordship's translation of Pliny's Epistles, 4to, London, 1751.
- Merit: a Poem, 4to, London, 1753.
- The Relief, or Day-Thoughts: a Poem, occasioned by The Complaint, or Night Thoughts [of E. Young] (anon.), 8vo, London, 1754.
- Verses to, . . . the Duke of Newcastle, on the Death of the Rt. Hon. Henry Pelham, 4to, London, 1754.
- The Invention of Letters, and the Utility of the Press [a poem], s. sh. fol., Dublin, 1755.
- An Address to Britain [a poem], 4to, London, 1760.
- Vectis; the Isle of Wight: a Poem, in three Cantos, 4to, London, 1766; another edition, published anonymously as The Isle of Wight, 8vo, Newport, I. W., 1781.
- Clifton: a Poem, in two Cantos, including Bristol and all its Environs, 4to, Bristol, 1667, or rather 1767; second edition, to which is added an Ode to Shakespear in honor of the Jubilee, &c., 1773.
- Kew Garden: a Poem, in two Cantos, 4to, London, 1767.
- Inoculation, or Beauty's Triumph: a Poem, 4to, Bath, 1768.

== See also ==
- List of 18th-century British working-class writers
