= Charlotte Bickersteth Wheeler =

British writer, teacher and linguist (c.1818–1884)

- Born: 1818; Clerkenwell
- Died: 26 November 1884 (aged 65–66); South Norwood
- Occupation: Writer, teacher, linguist
- Spouse(s): John Bleecher Wheeler (m. 1853)
- Children: 6

Charlotte Bickersteth Wheeler (née Cooper; 1818 – 26 November 1884) was a British writer on religious topics, teacher and linguist.

== Biography ==
Wheeler was born Charlotte Bickersteth Cooper was born in 1818 in Clerkenwell, Middlesex (present-day London) to The Rev John Cooper, the rector of Coppenhall, and Mary Anna Cooper (née Bickersteth). On 7 May 1818, Wheeler was baptised at St James's Church in Clerkenwell. In 1853, she married The Rev John Bleecher Wheeler, Rev. Cooper's curate. The Wheelers had six children. Their eldest son required institutionalization due to his special needs. Charlotte Wheeler and two of her daughters ran a school for girls in Croydon.

Wheeler was a linguist who knew both modern and ancient languages. She authored numerous works on religion, some of which were inspired by her school lessons. These included Our Master's Footsteps (1883), a popular gospel commentary for an audience of women. She also wrote the novels Taking the Consequences (1867) and Gleams Through the Mists (1877).

Charlotte Bickersteth Wheeler died in South Norwood, Surrey (present-day London) on 26 November 1884.

== Bibliography ==
- Memoir of John Lang Bickersteth. 1850.
- Memorials of a Beloved Mother: Being a Sketch of the Life of Mrs. Cooper. London: Wertheim and Macintosh, 1853.
- Taking the Consequences: A Book for the Present Day. 1 vol. Manchester: Palmer and Howe, 1867.
- Gleams Through the Mists, Literary and Domestic: or, A Story of Two Lives. 1 vol. London: Sampson Low, 1877.
- Chimes from By-Gone Years: Thoughts for Daily Reading. London: Elliot Stock, 1878.
- Our Master's Footsteps; or, Bible Class Notes for Thoughtful Girls. London: Elliot Stock, 1883.
- Golden Links. London: Elliot Stock, 1884.
- The Mother's Crown Jewels. London: Jarrold & Sons, 1885.
