= Nocturnal Revels =

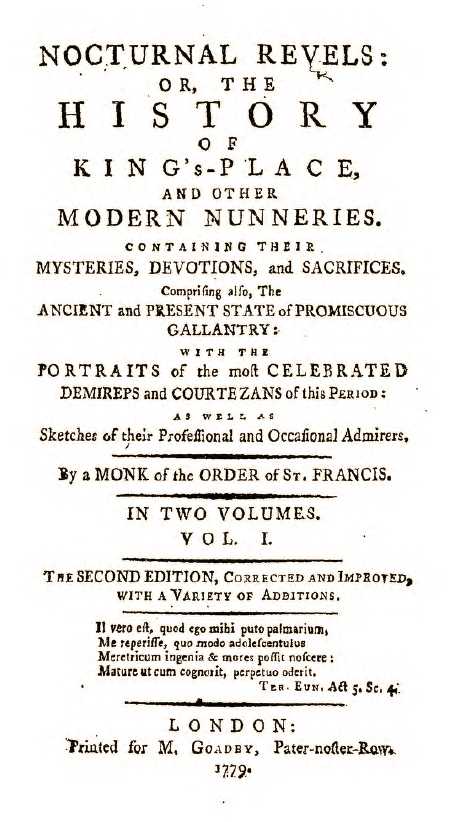
Nocturnal Revels title page

Nocturnal Revels is a 1779 two-volume book about prostitution in 18th-century London during the reign of George II.

The title page introduces the book as "the history of King's-Place and other modern nunneries", with authorship by a "monk of the Order of St Francis", and "containing their [the nunneries'] mysteries, devotions and sacrifices, comprising also, the ancient and present state of promiscuous gallantry: with the portraits of the most celebrated demireps and courtezans of this period: as well as sketches of their professional and occasional admirers".

The Order of St Francis is a coded reference to the Hellfire Club, founded by Francis Dashwood, the club later renamed the Order of the Monks of Medmenham. The "modern nunneries" the author describes are contemporary high-class brothels.

The book includes anecdotes about high-society figures who frequented brothels or were otherwise involved with prostitutes. Their names are partly blanked out, but were obviously recognisable, with a Miss Armstrong appearing as "Armstr_ng". Particular mention is given to the exploits of the Duke of Queensberry and the Earl of Sandwich.

The second volume includes a defence of prostitution as social necessity:

"Even in the state of matrimony itself, it often happens, that a man who holds his wife in the highest estimation, may be debarred the felicity of hymeneal raptures, from sickness, absence, and a variety of other temporary causes, which may with facility be imagined. If, in any of those situations, a man could not find temporary relief in the arms of prostitution, the peace of Society would be far more disturbed than it is: The brutal Ravisher would stalk at large, and would plead, as in the case of hunger, that the violence of his passion would break down even stone walls: No man's wife, sister, or daughter would be in a state of security: The rape of the Sabines would be daily rehearsed, and anarchy and confusion ensue. In this point of view then, at least, female prostitution should be winked at, if not protected; and though it may be pronounced a moral evil, it certainly is a political good".

In chapter 24 the writer provides a detailed description of life at Charlotte Hayes' seraglio (high-class brothel) at King's-Place, St James's (now Pall Mall Place off Pall Mall), and aspects of Hayes' life. Volume I states that Hayes' fortune was derived from the "follies, vices and profligacy of the age". There is an itemised price list from a typical day at the brothel, with entries including a client named Doctor Frettext, who would pay two guineas for the services of Poll Nimblewrist or Jenny Speedyhand. There is also an account of the recruitment techniques by which Charlotte Hayes tricked young women into joining the brothel.

== See also ==
- Harris's List of Covent Garden Ladies
