= Lucy Locket =

English language nursery rhyme

Nursery rhyme
- Published: 1842
- Songwriter(s): Unknown

"Lucy Locket" is an English language nursery rhyme. It has a Roud Folk Song Index number of 19536.

== Lyrics ==
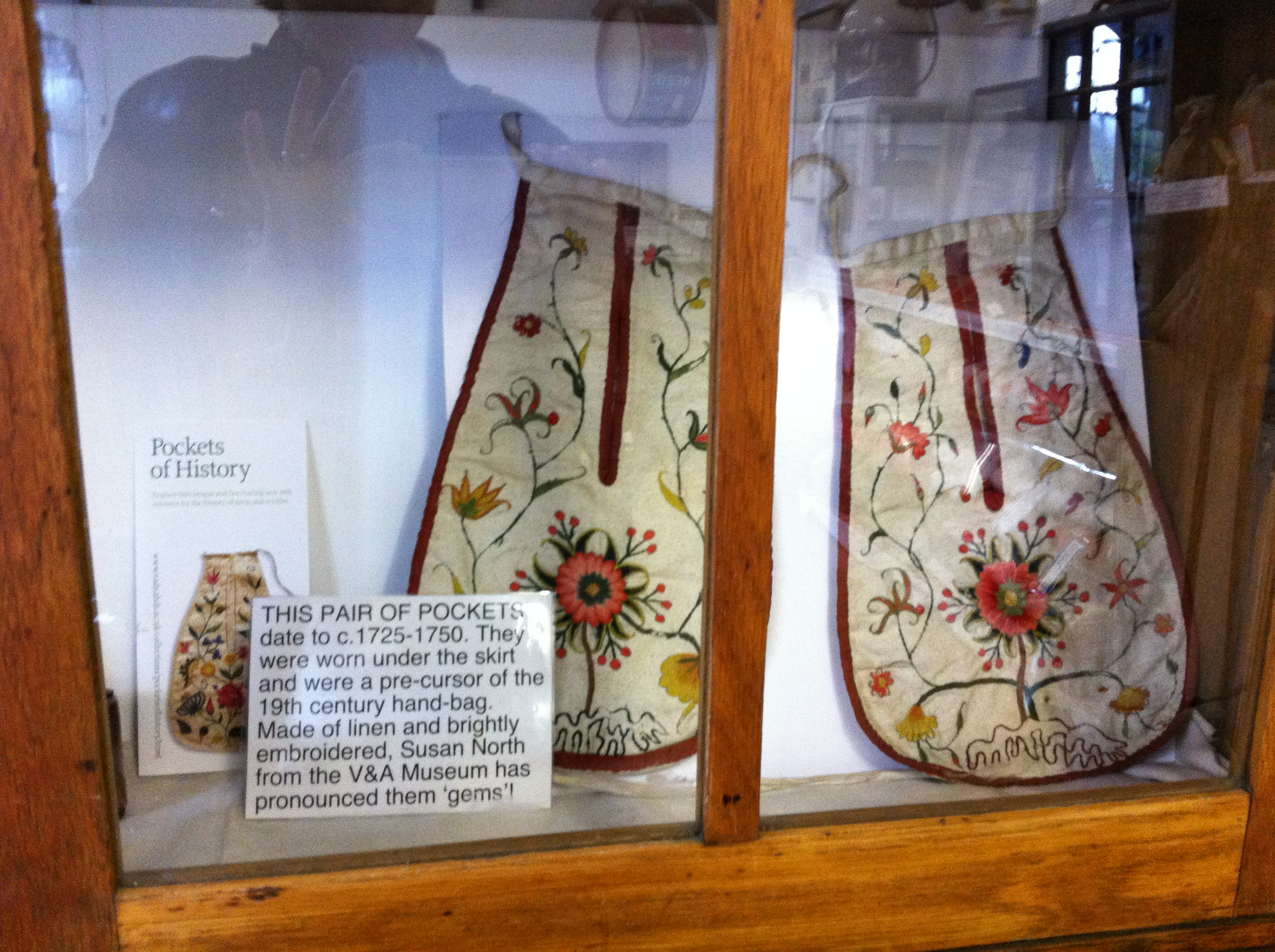
18th century-style hanging pockets

Common modern versions include:

Lucy Locket lost her pocket,
Kitty Fisher found it;
Not a penny was there in it,
Only ribbon round it.

Another version:

Lucy Locket lost her pocket,
Kitty Fisher found it;
Nothing in it, nothing in it,
But a binder round it.

== Tune ==
One version of the song shares its tune with "Simple Simon", "Jack and Jill", and "Yankee Doodle", with Yankee Doodle emerged in North America in the mid-eighteenth century, but it is not clear which set of lyrics emerged first.

== Origins and meaning ==
Historically, the term "pocket" referred to a pouch worn around the waist by women in the 17th to 19th centuries. Skirts or dresses of the time had an opening at the waistline to allow access to the pocket which hung around the woman's waist by a ribbon or tape. The opening in the skirt was formed by leaving unstitched, near the waist, the panels of fabric for the skirt. Fabrics could be around 20 inches wide, so seaming the selvedges offered a reliable opportunity for an opening. Corresponding opening in the panels of fabric forming the petticoat underneath.

The rhyme was first recorded by James Orchard Halliwell in 1842, but there is evidence that it was popular in Britain and America at least in the early nineteenth century. Various persons have been identified with Lucy Locket and Kitty Fisher. Halliwell suggested that they were "two celebrated courtesans of the time of Charles II", but no supportive evidence has been found.

The name Lucy Locket was used by John Gay in Beggar's Opera (1728), but may have already been proverbial. Kitty Fisher may have been Catherine Marie Fischer (d. 1767) a British courtesan who was the subject of three unfinished portraits by Joshua Reynolds and a number of songs, including an air recorded in Thompson's Country Dances (1760).
