= John June =

English engraver

John June (fl. 1740–1770) was an English engraver, best known for his portraits and book illustrations.

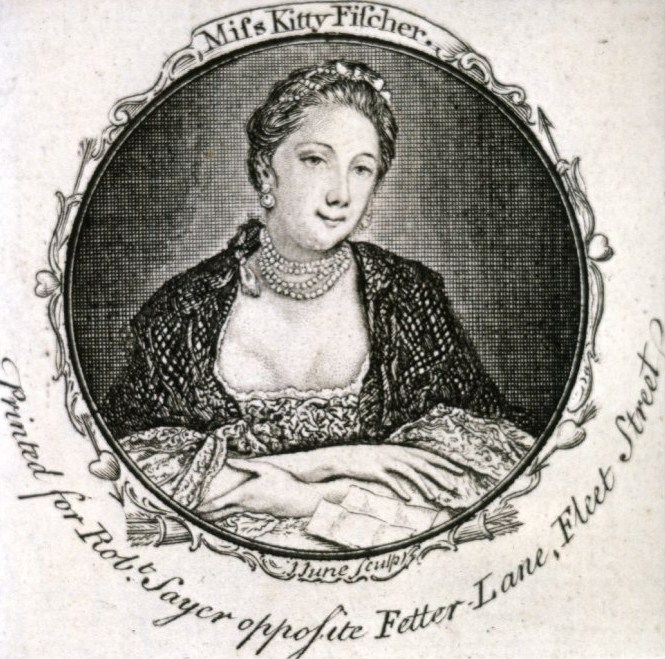
Watch-paper portrait of Kitty Fisher, c. 1759, by John June

== Works ==
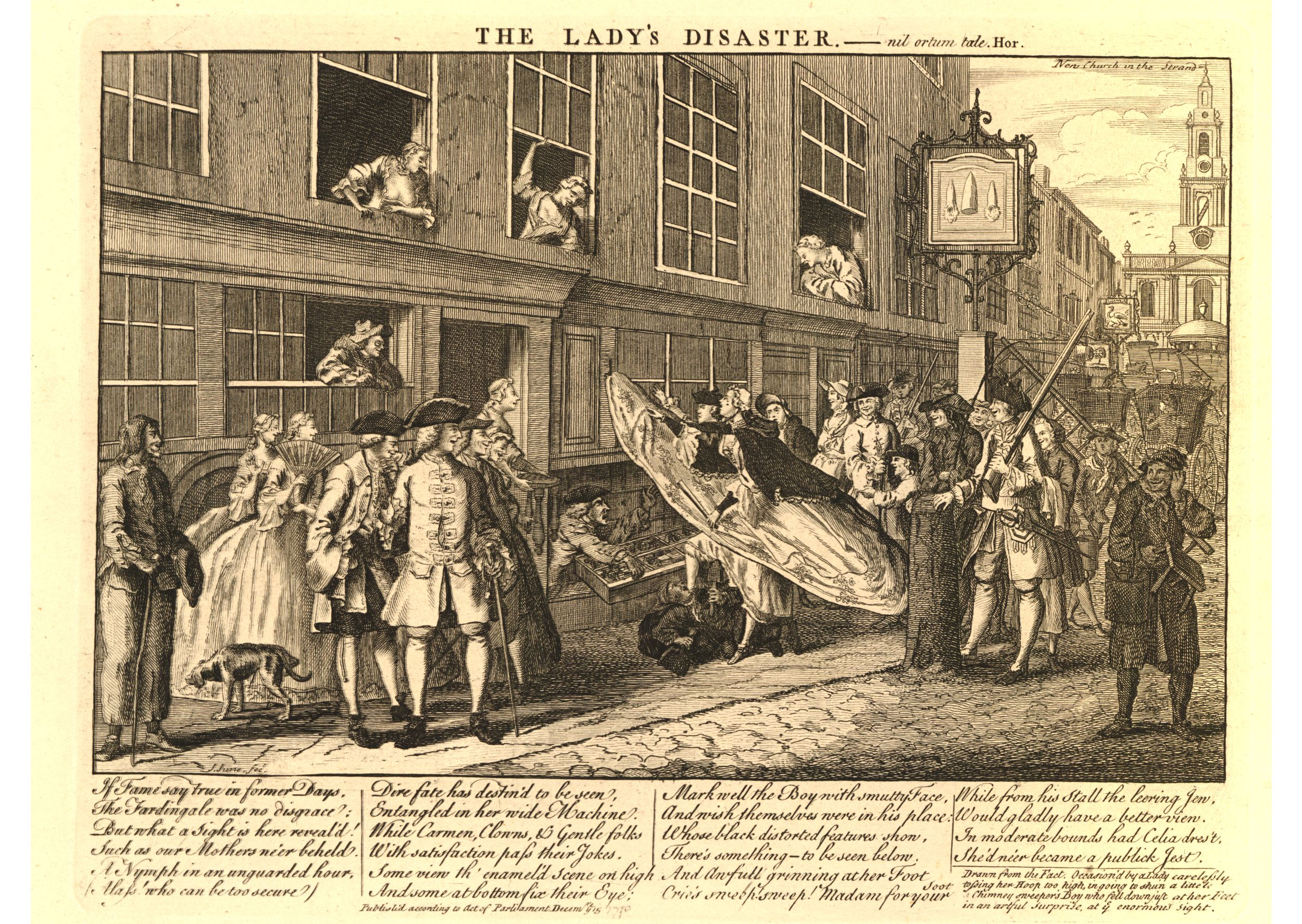
The Lady's Disaster, 1747 engraving by John June

June worked regularly for the publisher Robert Sayer. He made engravings from his own drawings, as a general rule, though he did make plates after John Collett. Some of them, such as The Farm Yard and The Death of the Fox, were engraved in a bold style, and unusually large. His works include View of Cheapside on Lord Mayor's Day, November 1761.

== Notes ==
Attribution

- This article incorporates text from a publication now in the public domain: Lee, Sidney, ed. (1892). "June, John". Dictionary of National Biography. Vol. 30. London: Smith, Elder & Co.
