= Charlotte Hayes =

British brothel keeper

- Born: c.1725 Genoa, Italy
- Died: 1813 (aged 89–90)
- Other name: Charlotte Ward
- Occupation: Brothel keeper
- Partner: Dennis O'Kelly

Charlotte Hayes (c. 1725–1813) was a brothel keeper in early Georgian London, and the owner of some of the city's most luxurious brothels in and around King's Place, in St James's.

== Biography ==
Although the precise details of Hayes's early life are unknown, it is believed she was born in Genoa (as cited in the 1761 edition of Harris's List of Covent Garden Ladies) to the courtesan and brothel keeper, Elizabeth Ward. In her early career as a prostitute, she was known as Charlotte Ward. Eventually, she would grow to be considered one of the most desirable 'women of the town', along with Lucy Cooper and Fanny Murray. It is unknown why or when she adopted the surname of Hayes.

In the 1750s, Charlotte had two fairly well-documented liaisons; one with Robert "Beau" Tracy, the wealthy son of a judge, and another with his friend, Samuel Derrick, an impoverished Irish poet who became the author of Harris's List of Covent Garden Ladies. Upon Derrick's death in 1769 he was buried at St Peter and St Paul's church, Bath, on 2 April 1769, according to its parish register, and bequeathed the profits of the final edition of Harris's List to her.

In spite of her success as a brothel keeper, first in Soho, at Berwick Street and Great Marlborough Street, and then in St James's, at King's Street, King's Place, and Arlington Street, Hayes was committed to debtors' prisons on several occasions. Fergus Linnane writes that Hayes was committed to the Marshalsea prison in 1776 for refusing to pay £50 to a bankrupt lacemaker.

During her stay in the Fleet Prison in the late 1750s, she met Dennis O'Kelly, who became her partner in life as well as in business. Contrary to popular belief, Hayes and O'Kelly never married, but lived as common-law husband and wife. In her later years, she chose to be known as Mrs O'Kelly or Charlotte Kelly.

Dennis O'Kelly was a professional gambler and race horse owner and eventually made his fortune through the purchase of the prize-winning stallion Eclipse. With the money he earned through breeding Eclipse, and what Charlotte earned through running several brothels, the couple were able to purchase two estates, Clay Hill outside of Epsom, and later Canons Park, in addition to numerous properties throughout St James. It is believed that Charlotte's enterprise was worth £20,000, but that collectively, she and Dennis O'Kelly owned assets worth £70,000 by the early 1780s.

After Dennis' death in 1787, Charlotte's health began to decline. Correspondence between Dennis O'Kelly's family members seem to indicate that her mental state also had begun to suffer.

Towards the end of her life, Charlotte once more found herself in financial difficulties and was committed to debtors' prison again in 1798. This time, Dennis O'Kelly's nephew, Andrew O'Kelly, bailed her out, but only on the condition that she sign over to him all her assets.

She died in unknown circumstances in 1813.

Many years before her death, in 1779, a book supposedly written "By a Monk of the Order of Sr. Francis" was published in London under the following title Nocturnal Revels: or, the History of King's Place and other Modern Nunneries, containing Their Mysteries, Devotions, and Sacrifices, Comprising also, The Ancient and Present State of Promiscuous Gallantry.''It told the story, among other things, of Charlotte Hayes' profitable trade and provided a detailed Italic textmenu of the pleasures she offered to her wealthy clients.

== Studies ==
Hayes's story is told in detail in Hallie Rubenhold's The Covent Garden Ladies (2005), as well as in Nicholas Clee's Eclipse: the Story of the Rogue, the Madam and the Horse That Changed Racing (2009). It is also discussed in Fergus Linnane's, London, the Wicked City, as well as in several books by E. J. Burford.

The TV series, Harlots, drew from Hayes' lifetime for its plot.

== See also ==
- Harris's List of Covent Garden Ladies
- Lucy Cooper, Georgian Courtesan
- Fanny Murray, Courtesan

== Additional sources ==
- Linnane, Fergus (2003), London: the wicked city : a thousand years of vice in the capital, Robson, ISBN 9781861056191
- Rubenhold, Hallie (2012). The Covent Garden Ladies: The inspiration behind ITV show HARLOTS. Transworld. ISBN 9781448153916.
- Trumbach, Randolph (1998). Sex and the Gender Revolution, Volume 1: Heterosexuality and the Third Gender in Enlightenment London. University of Chicago Press. ISBN 9780226812908.
- Williams, Kate (2007). England's Mistress: The Infamous Life of Emma Hamilton. Penguin Random House. ISBN 9780099451839.
- Wright, John D. (2018). Bloody HIstory of London: Crime, Corruption and Murder. Amber Books Ltd. ISBN 9781782745709.
