= Kitty Fisher =

English courtesan

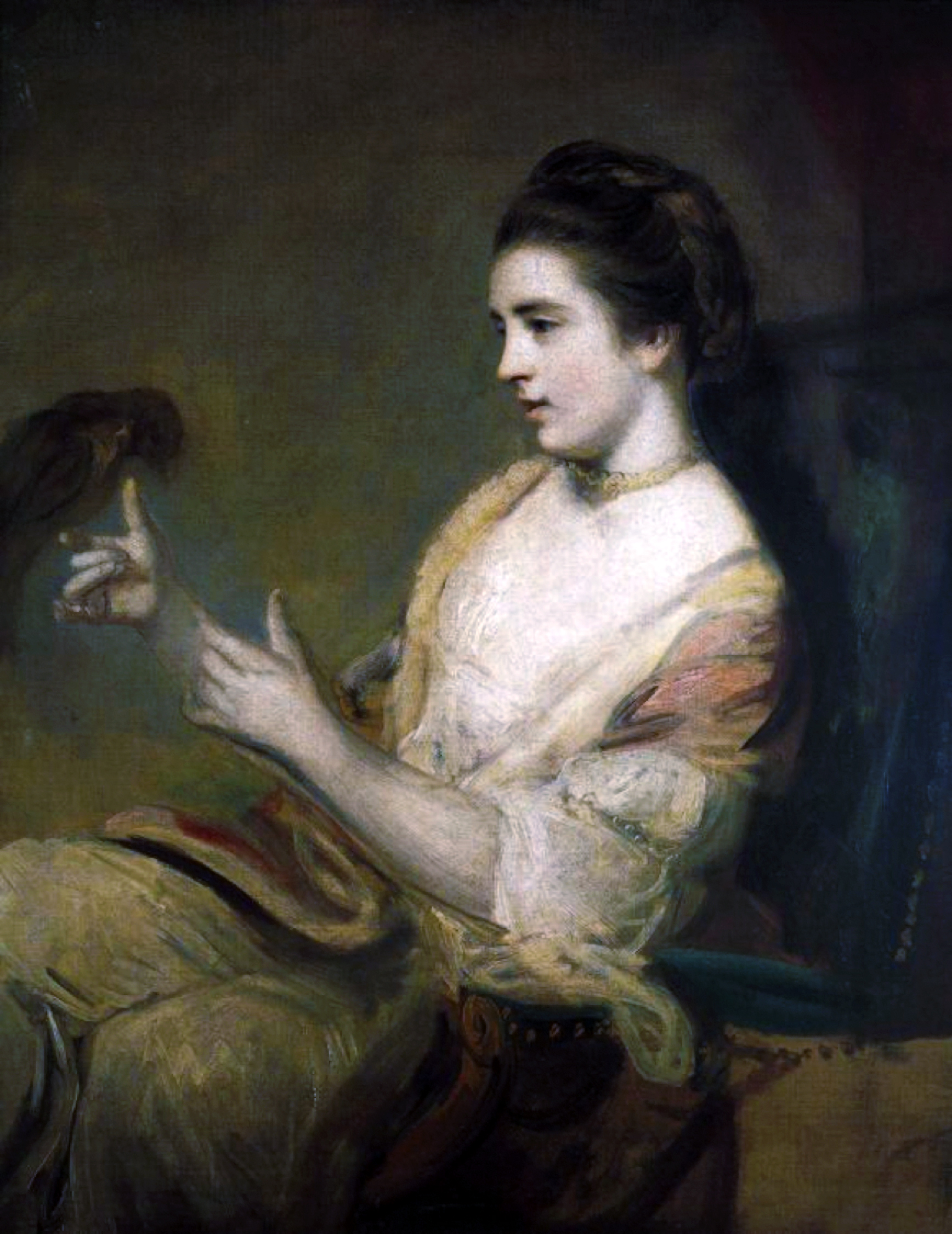
- Kitty Fisher and parrot, by Joshua Reynolds (1763/4)
- Born: Catherine Maria Fischer; 1 June 1741; Soho, Westminster, London, England
- Died: 10 March 1767 (aged 25)
- Occupation: Courtesan
- Spouse: John Norris (m. 1766)

Catherine Maria Fischer (1 June 1741 – 10 March 1767), better known as Kitty Fisher, was an English courtesan. From her teenage years onward, Fisher developed a carefully moulded public image, which was enhanced by acknowledgement from Sir Joshua Reynolds and other artists. By emphasizing Fisher's beauty, audacity, and charm, portraits of her, along with newspaper and magazine articles promoted her reputation, prompting spectators to view her with awe. She was one of the world's first celebrities who was not famous for being an actress, musician, or member of the royalty, but simply for being famous. Her life exemplifies the emergence of mass media publishing and fame in an era when capitalism, commercialism, global markets, and rising emphasis on public opinion were transforming England.

== Early life and time as a courtesan ==
Kitty Fisher by Sir Joshua Reynolds, painted 1759,Petworth House, Sussex (National Trust, # 486167)

Born in London, (Note: A German background, suggested as a possibility in the Dictionary of National Biography, is based on Sir Joshua Reynolds' spelling of her name consistently as "Fischer" and once as "Fisscher".) Kitty Fischer was the daughter of John Henry Fischer and Ann Fischer. According to some sources, she was originally a milliner, whom either Commodore Augustus Keppel, second son of the Earl of Albemarle (as reported by Town and Country in 1771) or perhaps Lieutenant-General (then Ensign) Anthony George Martin (d. 1800) reportedly introduced to London high society. With a flair for publicity, she became known for her affairs with men of wealth. She almost certainly knew Derbyshire's wealthiest nobleman, Philip Eyre Gell. In January 1759, Gell's friend Thomas Bowlby wrote to him : ‘You must come to town to see Kitty Fisher, the most pretty, extravagant, wicked little whore that ever flourished. You may have seen her but she was nothing till this winter.’Both later sat for Reynolds in overlapping years in the early 1760s; Gell’s full-length portrait was already under way by May 1761 and is generally dated about 1763, while Fisher’s recorded sittings continued through 1761–1766.

Portrait of Philip Gell by Sir Joshua Reynolds

By 1758 Fisher was fast becoming the biggest celebrity across the land. Her appearance and dress were scrutinized and copied. Scurrilous broadsheets and satires upon her were printed and circulated, and several portraits of her by Joshua Reynolds, including one in which she posed as Cleopatra Dissolving the Pearl, were engraved. Prints from these engravings were sold to thousands of her fans, making Kitty Fisher one of the first "pin-up" glamour girls.

In one famous incident, on 12 March 1759, Kitty Fisher fell off her horse while riding in St James's Park and as she landed gave the crowd ‘favourable opportunity of viewing those charms which decency dictates should be hidden’ (as split-leg undergarments did not exist in the time period). Scores of broadsheets, ballads, and prints mocked her, playing on the pun of her being a fallen woman. But Fisher was not one to be outdone, and she immediately seized public attention for her own ends by having her portrait painted by Joshua Reynolds, the most prominent painter in England.

Her fame spread throughout Europe. When he visited London in 1763, the famous Italian lover Giacomo Casanova met Fisher and wrote:

“... the illustrious Kitty Fisher, who was just beginning to be fashionable. She was magnificently dressed, and it is no exaggeration to say that she had on diamonds worth five hundred thousand francs. Goudar told me that if I liked I might have her then and there for ten guineas. I did not care to do so, however, for, though charming, she could only speak English, and I liked to have all my senses, including that of hearing, gratified. When she had gone, Mrs Wells told us that Kitty had eaten a bank-note for a thousand guineas, on a slice of bread and butter, that very day. (Note: Reynolds' fancy piece of her, Kitty Fisher as Cleopatra Dissolving the Pearl (1759), is at the Tate Gallery (on-line catalog entry); to reinforce the identification, Reynolds posed her in the same manner as a Cleopatra by Angelo Trevisani in the Galleria Spada, Rome.) The note was a present from Sir Akins, brother of the fair Mrs Pitt. I do not know whether the bank thanked Kitty for the present she had made it.”

Kitty Fisher by Nathaniel Hone, Canterbury Museums and Art Galleries (# CANCM:4031)

It is unclear to what extent Casanova's account is to be trusted, as similar stories of a currency or banknote sandwich were told about several other women who were Fisher's contemporaries. His insistence that Fisher spoke only English is contradicted by other sources. It is possible Casanova sought to link his name to Fisher's due to her celebrity status. Another visitor, Johann Wilhelm von Archenholz, wrote in 1791:

[Fisher] was indebted to nature for an uncommon portion of beauty, judgement and wit, joined to a most agreeable and captivating vivacity. The union of so many perfectons procured the esteem ... of those who prefer Cyprian delights to the other pleasures of life. This lady knew her own merit; she demanded a hundred guineas a night, for the use of her charms, and she was never without votaries, to whom the offering did not seem exhorbitant.

Fisher maintained a famous rivalry with Maria Gunning, who had become Lady Coventry after a calculated insertion into the marriage market orchestrated by Gunning's mother. Fisher's rumored affair with Lord Coventry several years later sparked the rivalry. Giustiniana Wynne, visiting London at the time, wrote:

The other day they ran into each other in the park, and Lady Coventry asked Kitty the name of the dressmaker who had made her dress. Kitty Fisher answered, she had better ask Lord Coventry as he had given her the dress as a gift." The altercation continued with Lady Coventry calling her an impertinent woman, and Fisher replying that she would have to accept this insult because Maria became her 'social superior' on marrying Lord Coventry, but she was going to marry a Lord herself just to be able to answer back.

Kitty Fisher (1741–1767) as Cleopatra Dissolving the Pearl, Kenwood House

Fisher's retort to Lady Coventry shows her intentions to marry a Lord and, thus, ascend social class by means of marriage, in much the same way as Gunning herself. Fisher's cynical assessment of the gender politics of the day shows an awareness of the constraints on single women with a mind towards greater social mobility, but also serves as a condemnation of the Gunning girls for positioning themselves to marry wealthy, powerful men, merely for their own means and preservation. Wynne also wrote that "She lives in the greatest possible splendor, (Note: In Carrington Street in fashionable Mayfair, according to DNB.) spends 12,000 pounds a year, and she is the first of her social class to employ liveried servants—she even has liveried chaise porters." (Note: Quoted in A Venetian Affair by Andrea di Robilant.)

== Later life and death ==
Apart from the letters of Giustiniana Wynne, she is also mentioned in the diaries and letters of Madame D'Arblay and Horace Walpole among others.

Portrait of Catherine Maria 'Kitty' Fisher, c.1765 by Nathaniel Hone (Private Collection)

In 1766, she married John Norris, the M.P. for Rye and son of Admiral Sir John Norris. She came to live at her husband's family house, Hemsted (now the premises of the prestigious English public school Benenden School). Some sources say she settled into the proper role of mistress of Hemsted, building up Norris's fortune and enjoying the company of the locals, who appreciated her generosity to the poor. However, she died only four months after her marriage, some sources say from the effects of lead-based cosmetics (although this may be a confusion with the fate of her rival Lady Coventry), or possibly from smallpox or consumption (now known as tuberculosis), in 1767. She was buried in Benenden churchyard dressed in her best ball gown.

== Portraits ==
The first artist known to have painted Fisher was Joshua Reynolds. In addition to the portraits made famous through engraved prints that were marketed directly to the public, he did several other paintings of Fisher, some of which appear to be unfinished studies.

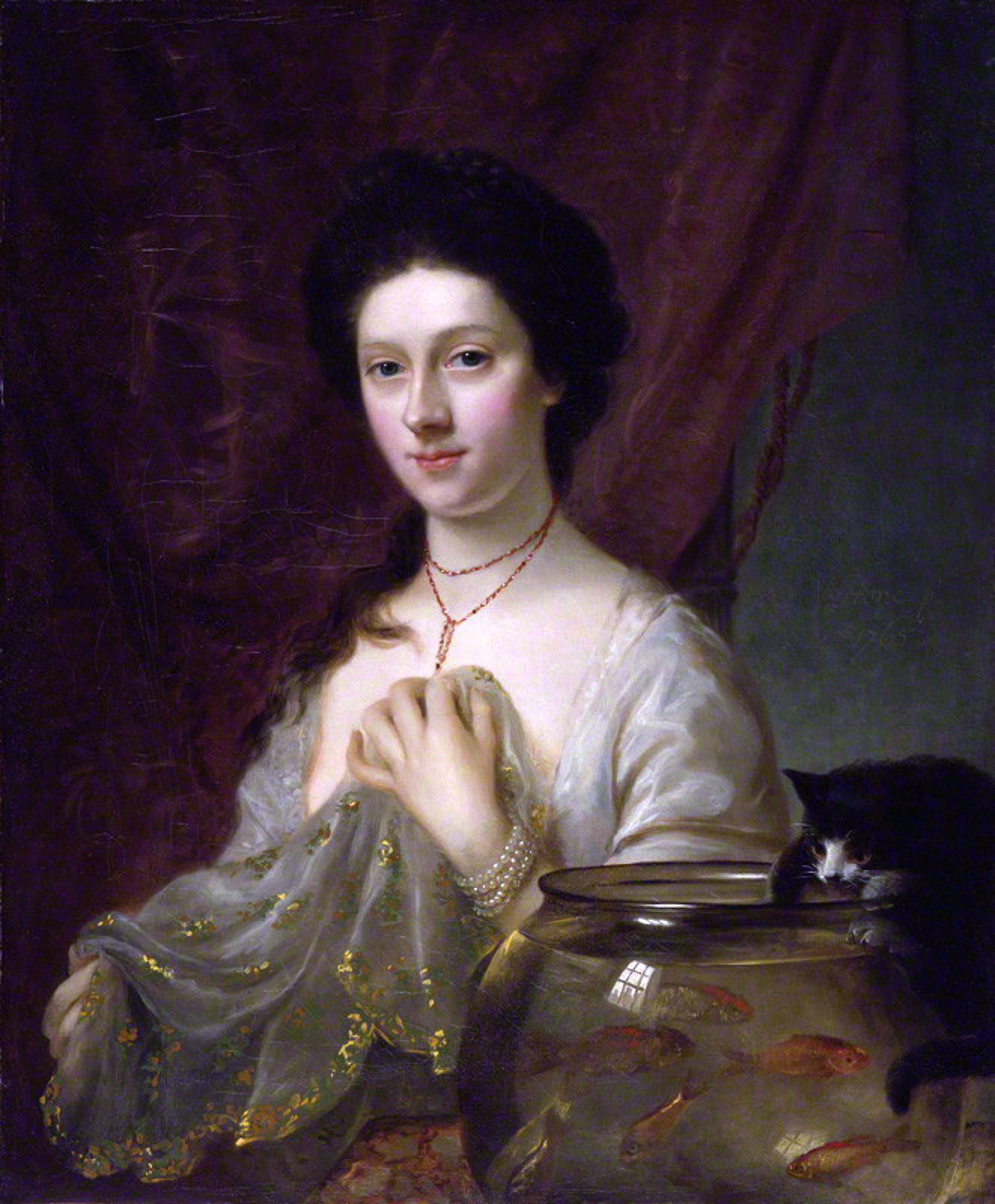
"Catherine Maria Kitty Fisher" by Nathaniel Hone.

Nathaniel Hone painted her at least twice in 1765, at the height of her popularity, one of his works includes the famous rebus of a cat trying to catch a goldfish - a 'Kitty Fisher', now in the National Portrait Gallery, London. Besides sitting multiple times for Hone and Reynolds, she may have been painted by Philip Mercier, James Northcote, and Richard Purcell, among others.

== Legacy ==
Fisher is mentioned in the nursery rhyme Lucy Locket:

"Lucy Locket lost her pocket,
Kitty Fisher found it;
But ne'er a penny was there in't
Except the binding round it."

Music publisher Peter Thompson also published a country dance bearing her name in Volume II of Thompson's Complete Collection of 200 Country Dances published in 1764. During her lifetime, numerous books and articles claiming to tell her life story were published, although these were often spurious and make it difficult to separate biographical facts from the myth of Kitty Fisher. She was also included as a character in several eighteenth-century novels, including Chrysal by Charles Jonstone. A fictionalized version of Fisher, played by Kirsty MacColl, appeared in the 1991 Channel Four historic musical fantasy Ghosts of Oxford Street.

== Engraved portraits ==
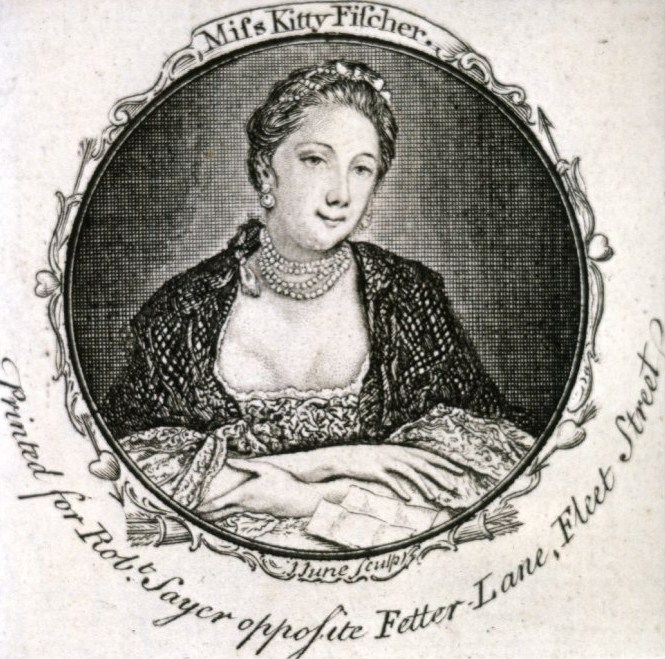
Watch-Paper engraved by John June with portrait of Kitty Fisher (British Museum )

Mezzotint portrait of Kitty Fisher by Richard Houston after Sir Joshua Reynolds published Robert Sayer 1759-1765

The Merry Accident, satirising Kitty Fisher's exposure when falling from her horse, Spring 1759 (Library of Congress )

Engraved portrait of Kitty Fisher, circa 1765, recycled from identical image of Fanny Murray (British Museum )

Print depicting Fanny Murray, published by Richard Bennet, 1754 - used as the basis for Kitty Fisher portrait (Victoria and Albert Museum)

'Kitty Fell' from Favourite Collection of English Songs Sung by Mr. Beard, Miss Young etc. at Ranelagh Gardens (1757)

== See also ==
- Harriette Wilson, a London courtesan during the Regency era
- Fanny Murray, Kitty Fisher's greal courtesan rival
- Maria Coventry, Countess of Coventry with whom Kitty had a public feud
- Lucy Cooper, leading courtesan before Kitty Fisher
