= Divan Club =

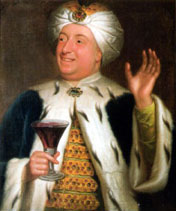
Sir Francis Dashwood, 2nd Baronet (1708–1781), notorious "bon vivant" and builder of West Wycombe Park, dressed in his "Ottoman" dining club garb

The Divan Club was a short-lived dining club in 18th century England, with membership open to gentlemen who had visited the Ottoman Empire. The club took its name from the Turkish "divan".

The club was founded in 1744 by John Montagu, 4th Earl of Sandwich and Sir Francis Dashwood, who was also a leading member of the Dilettante Society. Members met to dine and relate experiences in the east. Its members included distinguished travellers, who made important contributions to travel writing and knowledge of culture and art in the region controlled by the Ottoman Empire. "The Harem" as a regular club toast. The club lasted for only two years, ending in 1746, when Dashwood founded the Hellfire Club.

In 2007 the club was revived at a dinner held at The Travellers Club and continues to meet regularly in London and Istanbul. Members, including men and women, are writers, historians, diplomats, publishers, bankers and archeologists with an interest in modern Turkey as well as the legacy of the Ottoman Empire.

== Literature and sources ==
- Illustrated monograph on The Divan Club by Dr. Rachel Finnegan: The Divan Club, 1744-46 Published in: The Electronic Journal of Oriental Studies, 2006 (ISSN 0928-6802).
