= Sponging-house =

Historical UK debtors' prison

A sponging-house (more formally: a lock-up house) was a place of temporary confinement for debtors in the United Kingdom.

If a borrower defaulted on repaying a debt, a creditor could lay a complaint with the sheriff. The sheriff sent his bailiffs or tipstaffs to arrest the debtor and to take him to the local sponging-house. This was not a debtors' prison as such, but a private house, often the bailiff's own home. Debtors would be held there temporarily in the hope that they could make some arrangement with creditors. Anthony Trollope set out the system in his 1857 novel The Three Clerks:

He was taken to the sponging-house, and it was there imparted to him that he had better send for two things – first of all for money, which was by far the more desirable of the two; and secondly, for bail, which even if forthcoming was represented as being at best but a dubious advantage.

If debtors could not sort matters out quickly, they were then taken before a court and transferred to a debtor's prison.

Sponging-houses had a terrible reputation. They could be much feared, and were not always appreciated by their clients, as was made clear in a description of Abraham Sloman's establishment in Cursitor Street, Chancery Lane, which was provided by one of the characters featuring in the 1892 book Round London: Down East and Up West, which was written by Montagu Williams (1835-1892), a London lawyer, to whom sponging-houses were well-known:

[...] Ah, my dear fellow, you've never seen a sponging-house! Ye gods – what a place! I had an apartment they were pleased to call a bedroom to myself certainly, but if I wanted to breathe the air I had to do so in a cage in the back garden – iron bars all round, and about the size of one of the beast receptacles at the Zoo. For this luxury I had to pay two guineas a day. A bottle of sherry cost a guinea, a bottle of Bass half-a-crown, and food was upon the same sort of economical tariff. [...]

The idea of the sponging-house was based on that of the sponge that gave it its name, which readily gives up its contents on being squeezed. In the sponging-house, debtors had any available cash squeezed out of them, partly to the creditor's benefit, but also to that of the bailiff who ran it.

In French, éponger une dette ('sponge-up a debt') means to repay one's debt. Scottish English has the verb to spung, meaning to rob. The English-language term spunging-house dates from at least 1699.

== Notable sponging-house residents ==
- Michael Arne - composer
- Henry Fielding – author
- Benjamin Flower - journalist
- Theodore Edward Hook – author
- Joseph Lancaster - educational reformer
- Andrew Matveof - ambassador of czar Peter the Great
- George Morland – painter
- Fanny Murray - courtesan
- John Murray – Universalist minister
- Robert Murray - financier
- William Paget - actor
- Gilbert Stuart – painter

== See also ==
- Marshalsea
