= Charlotte Bickersteth Ward =

- Born: June 17, 1822; Islington
- Died: September 11, 1896; Hampstead
- Occupation: Writer
- Spouse: Edward Langton Ward
- Parents: Edward Bickersteth (father); Sarah Bignold (mother)
- Relatives: Edward Bickersteth, Elizabeth Bickersteth, Harriet Bickersteth Cook

Charlotte Bickersteth Ward (17 June 1822 – 11 September 1896) was a British writer.

Charlotte Bickersteth Ward was born on 17 June 1822 in Islington, the second daughter of the Rev. Edward Bickersteth, rector of Watton, and Sarah Bignold Bickersteth. Her siblings included Edward Bickersteth, future Bishop of Exeter, and Elizabeth Bickersteth, wife of Thomas Rawson Birks, and Harriet Bickersteth Cook, religious writer and mother of Albert Ruskin Cook. In 1866, she married Edward Langton Ward, rector of Blendworth.

She wrote dozens of works, most of them on religious topics. She wrote a memoir of her sisters Elizabeth and Frances and three novels, Broad Shadows on Life's Pathway (1861), The Post of Honour (1863), and Life in the Ghetto: or, The Jewish Physician (1872). She also wrote the widely-anthologized poem "Lean Hard."

Her diaries for the years 1855 to 1863 are in the Wellcome Collection.

Charlotte Bickersteth Ward died on 11 September 1896 in Hampstead.

== Bibliography ==
- Dawn and Sunrise: Brief Notices of the Life and Early Death of B. S. Gordon [Barbara Sophia Gordon]. 1850.
- Doing and Suffering: Memorials of Elizabeth and Frances, daughters of the late Rev. E. Bickersteth. Seely, Jackson & Halliday, 1852.
- Broad Shadows on Life's Pathway. 1 vol. London: Seeley, 1861.
- The Post of Honour. 1 vol. London: Seeley, 1863.
- The Childhood of Jesus. London: J. F. Shaw, 1865.
- Christ's Wonderful Works. London: J. F. Shaw, 1865.
- Friends of Jesus. London: J. F. Shaw, 1865.
- Parables of Jesus. London: J. F. Shaw, 1865.
- Stories of the Holy Land. London: J. F. Shaw, 1865.
- Story of the Cross. London: J. F. Shaw, 1865.
- Abraham and Isaac. London: J. F. Shaw, 1866.
- Creation and the Deluge. London: J. F. Shaw, 1866.
- Joseph the Captive, and Joseph the Ruler. London: J. F. Shaw, 1866.
- Lending a Hand: or Help for the Working Classes. London: Seeley, 1866.
- The Old Picture Bible: Stories from the Life of Christ. London: Seeley, 1867.
- Pictures of the Old World. London: J. F. Shaw, 1868.
- Life in the Ghetto: or, The Jewish Physician. 1 vol. London: Charles J. Thynne, 1872.
