= Sir Richard Croft, 6th Baronet =

British doctor

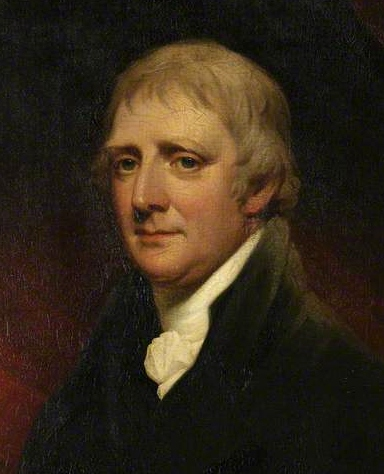
Sir Richard Croft by John James Halls, 1803–1804

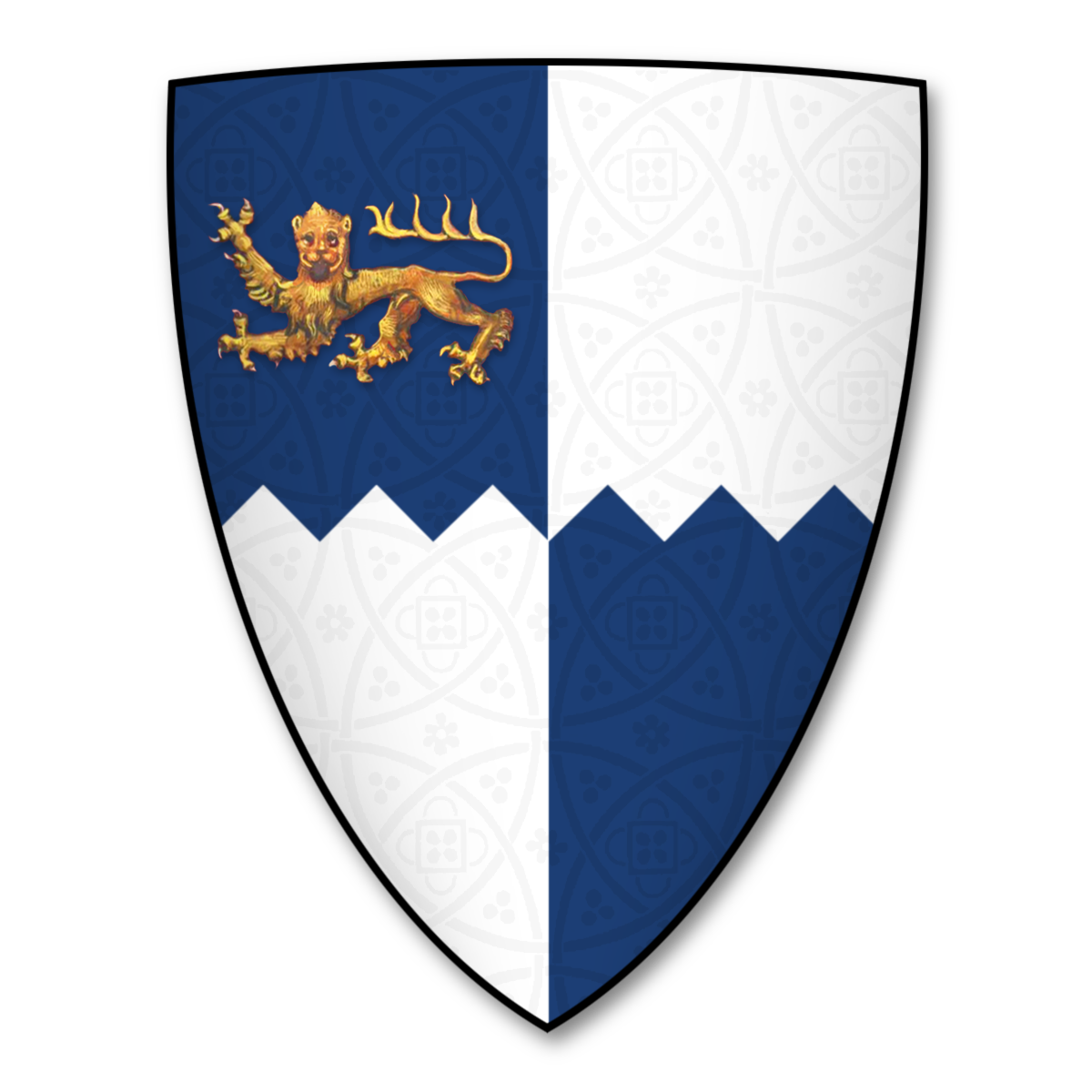
Arms of the Croft family, of Croft Castle, Herefordshire

Sir Richard Croft, 6th Baronet (9 January 1762 – 13 February 1818) was an English physician and obstetrician who became infamous due to his role in the "triple obstetrical tragedy" of 1817, which involved the deaths of Princess Charlotte of Wales, Princess Charlotte's child, and Croft himself.

== Early life and family ==
Croft was born on 9 January 1762 at Dunster Park, Berkshire, the son of Herbert Croft and Elizabeth Young. He married on 3 November 1789 Margaret Denman, daughter of Dr Thomas Denman and Elizabeth Brodie and sister of Thomas Denman, 1st Baron Denman, who became Lord Chief Justice of England.

They had four children: Thomas Elmsley Croft, who succeeded his father as 7th Baronet; Archer Denman Croft, who succeeded his brother as 8th Baronet; Frances Elizabeth Croft; and the Reverend Richard Croft, rector of Hillingdon, Middlesex. Croft's great-grandson through his third son was Henry Page Croft, 1st Baron Croft.

== Education ==
Croft began his medical training under Dr Rupert Chawner, an apothecary/surgeon residing at Burton-upon-Trent. After he completed his training under Dr Chawner, his parents sent him to London to complete his medical education. He became a pupil of Dr John Hunter; and by recommendation of Dr Matthew Baillie, (a fellow pupil of Croft's and nephew of Dr Hunter) he boarded and lodged with Dr Denman. Croft was also trained by his father-in-law, Dr Thomas Denman, a preeminent obstetrician in London at the turn of the nineteenth century, whose textbook on childbirth had been first published in 1788. He graduated with his MD from the University of Oxford in 1789. He held the office of Physician to King George III.

== Baronetcy ==
Croft succeeded to the Croft baronetcy, of Croft Castle in the County of Hereford, upon the death of his brother on 27 April 1816.

== "The triple obstetrical tragedy" ==
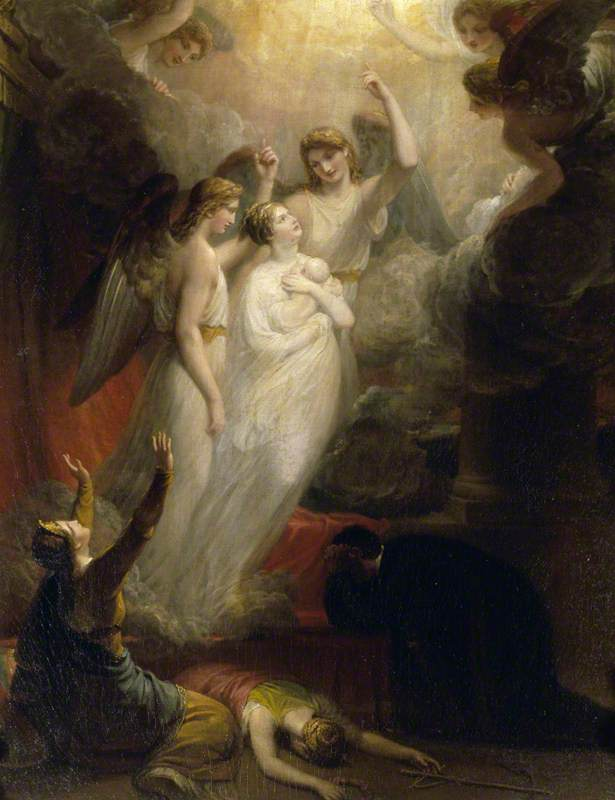
The Apotheosis of Princess Charlotte by Henry Howard, 1818

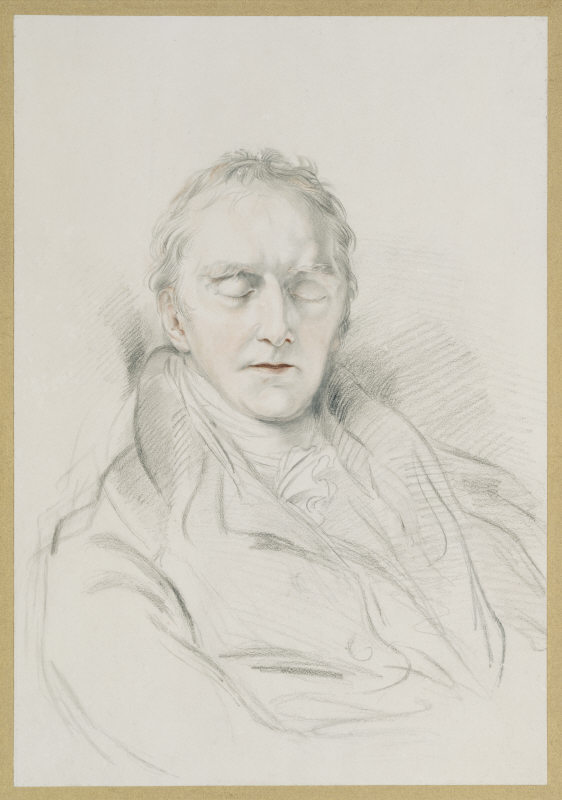
Posthumous portrait of Croft

When Princess Charlotte conceived in February 1817, Croft was chosen to attend her. Following medical dogma, Croft restricted her diet and bled her during the pregnancy. Her membranes broke 42 weeks after her last period on 3 November 1817. Her bedroom at Claremont was chosen as the labour and delivery room. The first stage of labour lasted 26 hours. At the beginning of the second stage of labour, Croft sent for Dr John Sims, who arrived seven hours later. The second stage of labour lasted 24 hours. He had correctly diagnosed a transverse lie of the baby during labour; however, forceps were not used as they had fallen into disfavour in the British medical community. A caesarean section at that time would have resulted in the princess's death. Eventually, Princess Charlotte delivered a stillborn nine-pound male. Five hours later she died. At the time this was presumed to be from concealed internal bleeding, but in 1988 academics at Yale University concluded that a more convincing explanation was a pulmonary embolism.

Although the princess's husband, Prince Leopold, and the Prince Regent, her father, sent messages to thank Croft for his care and attention, Croft was distraught over the outcome. The king ordered an autopsy, with the result that Sir Everard Home and Sir David Dundas reported that everything had been done for the best. However, the death of the princess continued to weigh heavily on Croft, and on 13 February 1818, at age 56, he killed himself with a gun while attending the labour of Mary Ann Thackeray, the wife of George Thackeray. Near his body a copy of Shakespeare's Love's Labour's Lost was found open at the passage "Fair Sir, God save you! Where is the Princess?" (Act V, Scene II).

Society portraitist Sir Thomas Lawrence was commissioned by Croft's half-sister to create a posthumous portrait sketch of Croft in his coffin. The haunting result, now at Croft Castle, is often taken for a man sleeping.

Charlotte's pregnancy is known in medical history as "the triple obstetrical tragedy", due to the loss of the baby, the mother and the obstetrician.

Both Croft and his wife are buried at St James's Church, Piccadilly. A memorial to them is found within the church.

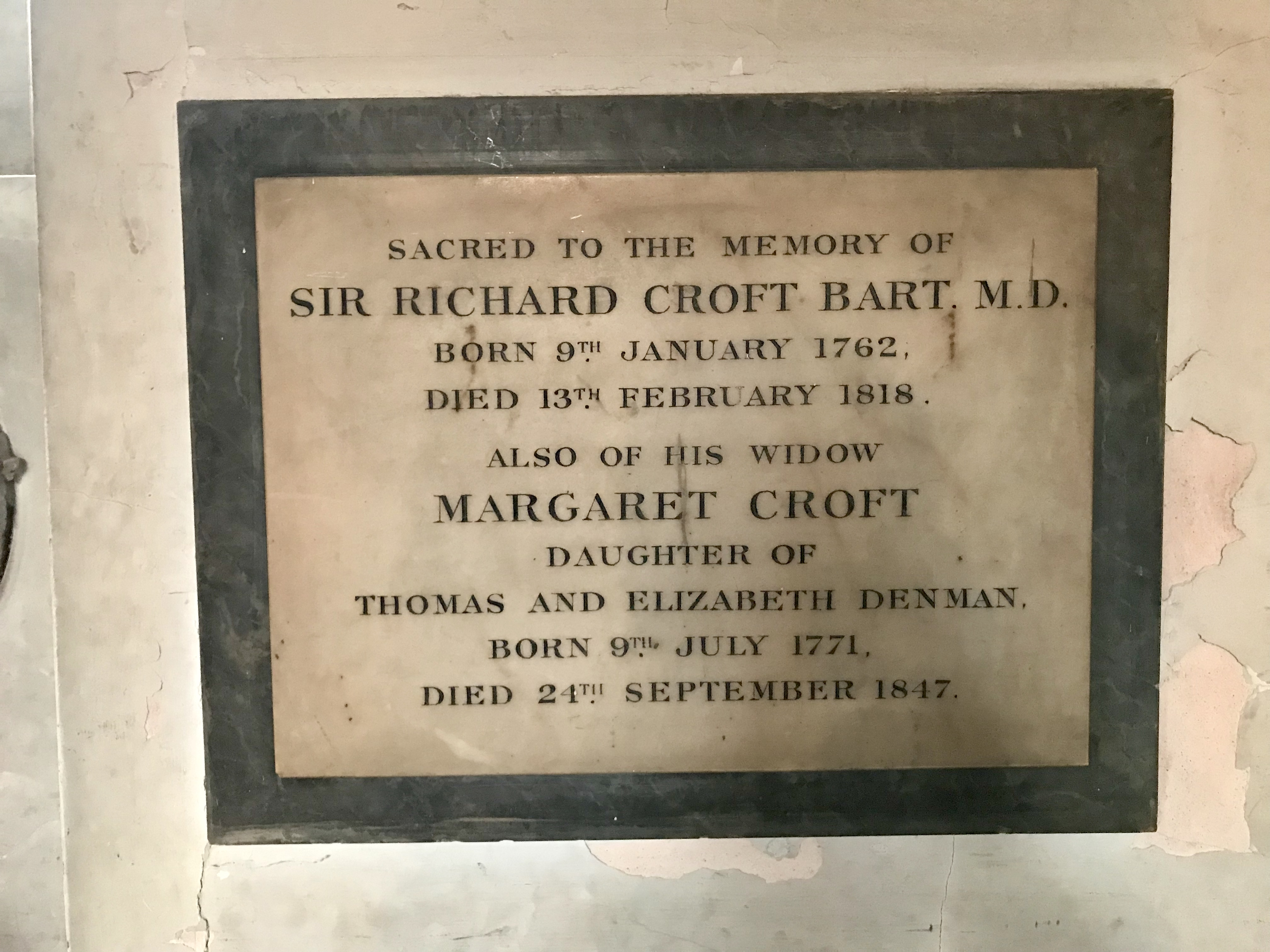
Memorial to Sir Richard and Lady Croft in St James's Church, Piccadilly

Baronetage of England
Preceded by Herbert Croft	Baronet (of Croft Castle); 1816–1818	Succeeded by Thomas Elmsley Croft
