= Richard Croft =

Richard Croft may refer to:

- Richard Croft (MP) for Herefordshire (UK Parliament constituency)
- Richard Croft (tenor), American tenor
- Sir Richard Croft, 6th Baronet (1762–1818), English physician to the British Royal Family
- Lord Richard Croft, Tomb Raider character
