= Bernard Croft =

- Born: Bernard Hugh Denman Croft; 24 August 1903 Armidale, New South Wales
- Died: 27 February 1984 (aged 80) Armidale, New South Wales
- School: The Armidale School

Rugby union career
- Position: wing
International career
Years	Team	Apps	(Points)
1928	Wallabies	1	(2)

Sir Bernard Hugh Denman Croft, 13th Baronet Croft of Croft Castle (24 August 1903 – 27 February 1984), was an Australian rugby union player. Croft, a wing, claimed one international rugby cap for Australia.

Croft was born in Boorolong station, Armidale, New South Wales, the son of Sir Hugh Matthew Fiennes Croft, 12th Baronet, and Lucy Taylor.

He died at Armidale in 1984.
