= Croft baronets of Cowling Hall (1818) =

Croft baronets of Cowling Hall

The Croft baronetcy, of Cowling Hall in the County of York, was created in the Baronetage of the United Kingdom on 17 December 1818 for John Croft, for his services during the Peninsular War. He shared a common ancestry with the Croft baronets of Croft Castle.

== Croft baronets, of Cowling Hall (1818) ==
- Sir John Croft, 1st Baronet (died 1862)
- Sir John Frederick Croft, 2nd Baronet (1828–1904)
- Sir Frederick Leigh Croft, 3rd Baronet (1860–1930)
- Sir John William Graham Croft, 4th Baronet (1910–1979)
- Sir John Archibald Radcliffe Croft, 5th Baronet (1910–1990)
- Sir Thomas Stephen Hutton Croft, 6th Baronet (born 1959)

There is no heir to the title as of 2026.

== Notes ==
Baronetage of the United Kingdom
Preceded by Shiffner baronets	Croft baronets of Cowling Hall; 17 December 1818	Succeeded by Bateson baronets
