= James Tunstall =

James Tunstall (1708?–1762) was an English cleric and classics scholar.

== Life ==
The son of James Tunstall, an attorney at Richmond, Yorkshire, he was born about 1708. He was educated at Slaidburn grammar school under Bradbury, and was admitted a sizar at St John's College, Cambridge, on 29 June 1724, aged over 16, being supported at university by an uncle. He graduated B.A. in 1727, M.A. in 1731, B.D. in 1738, and D.D. on 13 July 1744. His act for the doctor's degree was much applauded. On 24 March 1728–9 he was elected to a fellowship at his college, and ultimately became its senior dean and one of the two principal tutors. He was known as a "pupil monger", for his classical knowledge and manner.

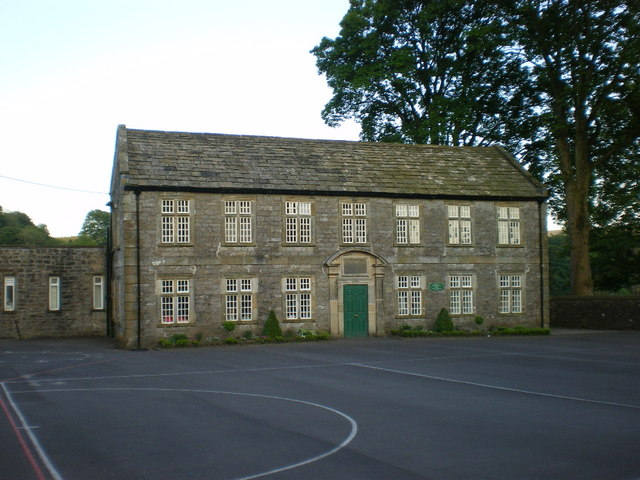
Brennand's Endowed School, Slaidburn today. The endowment by John Brennand was from 1717, so that in Tunstall's time the school was new.

Tunstall, on the presentation of Edward Harley, 2nd Earl of Oxford, was instituted on 4 December 1739 to the rectory of Sturmer, Essex, and held it until early in 1746. In October 1741 he was elected to the post of Public Orator at Cambridge, polling 160 votes against 137 recorded for Philip Yonge, and held it though absent from the university, until 1746, when his grace for a continuance of the permission was refused. This absence was caused by his appointment about 1743 as domestic chaplain to John Potter, the archbishop of Canterbury.

The archbishop offered Tunstall in 1744 the rectory of Saltwood in Kent, but it was declined. He accepted, however, the vicarage of Minster-in-Thanet (collated 12 February 1747), and the rectory of Great Chart (collated 6 March 1747). He had become a senior fellow of his college on 12 November 1746, but after these preferments he vacated his fellowship in February 1748. From 1746 to his death he was treasurer and canon residentiary of St. Davids.

On the nomination of archbishop Matthew Hutton he was collated on 11 November 1757 to the vicarage of Rochdale; but his ambition was prebendal stall at Canterbury Cathedral. He died at the house of a brother in Mark Lane, London, on 28 March 1762, and was buried in the chancel of St. Peter, Cornhill, on 2 April.

== Works ==
Tunstall published:

- Epistola ad virum eruditum Conyers Middleton, (1741) an attack on the life of Cicero by Conyers Middleton that questioned the genuineness of Cicero's letters to Brutus, which Middleton had accepted without reserve. Middleton replied sharply in The Epistles of Cicero to Brutus, and of Brutus to Cicero (1743), claiming to have vindicated their authenticity and to have confuted all the objections.
- Observations on the present Collection of Epistles between Cicero and Brutus, in answer to the late pretences of the Rev. Dr. Middleton (1744); in the following year Jeremiah Markland confirmed his view. Tunstall advertised a new edition of Cicero's letters to Atticus and to his brother Quintus, and he brought up with him to London in 1762 his annotations on the first three books of the letters. They were offered to William Bowyer, who declined to take them until the copy was ready. A week or two later Tunstall died.

Tunstall's other works were:

- A Sermon preached before the Hon. House of Commons, 1746.
- Vindication of Power of States to prohibit Clandestine Marriages, particularly those of Minors, 1755; and Marriage in Society stated, 1755. These were in answer to treatises of Henry Stebbing and were caused by the passing of the Clandestine Marriages Act 1753.
- Academica. Part I. Several Discourses on Natural and Revealed Religion, 1759.
- Lectures on Natural and Revealed Religion read in the Chapel of St. John's College, Cambridge, 1765. They were published by subscription for the benefit of his family, and were edited by his brother-in-law, Frederick Dodsworth, later canon of Windsor, who acted as a father to the children.

Tunstall gave critical annotations to the first edition of William Duncombe's Horace, and obtained William Warburton's notes on Hudibras for Zachary Grey. Warburton was a friend, and his letters to Grey were printed. Other friends included Thomas Baker and John Byrom. His library was sold in 1764, and 152 manuscript sermons by him passed to Sir Everard Home.

== Family ==
Tunstall married, about 1750, Elizabeth, daughter of John Dodsworth of Thornton Watlass, Yorkshire, by his wife Henrietta, daughter of John Hutton of Marske, and sister of Matthew Hutton, successively archbishop of York and Canterbury. After Tunstall's death, his widow moved to Hadleigh in Suffolk, and died there on 5 December 1772, in her forty-ninth year. A marble slab to her memory is at the west end of the north aisle.

Seven daughters at least survived Tunstall. The three that were living in 1772 were sent to Lisbon for their health. Henrietta Maria, the second, married, on 14 June 1775, John Croft, merchant at Porto, and was mother of Sir John Croft FRS; Catherine, the sixth daughter, married, first, the Rev. Edward Chamberlayne, and, secondly, Horatio, Lord Walpole; Jane, the seventh daughter, married, first, Stephen Thompson, and, secondly, Sir Everard Home.
