= Frank Howard (painter) =

English painter

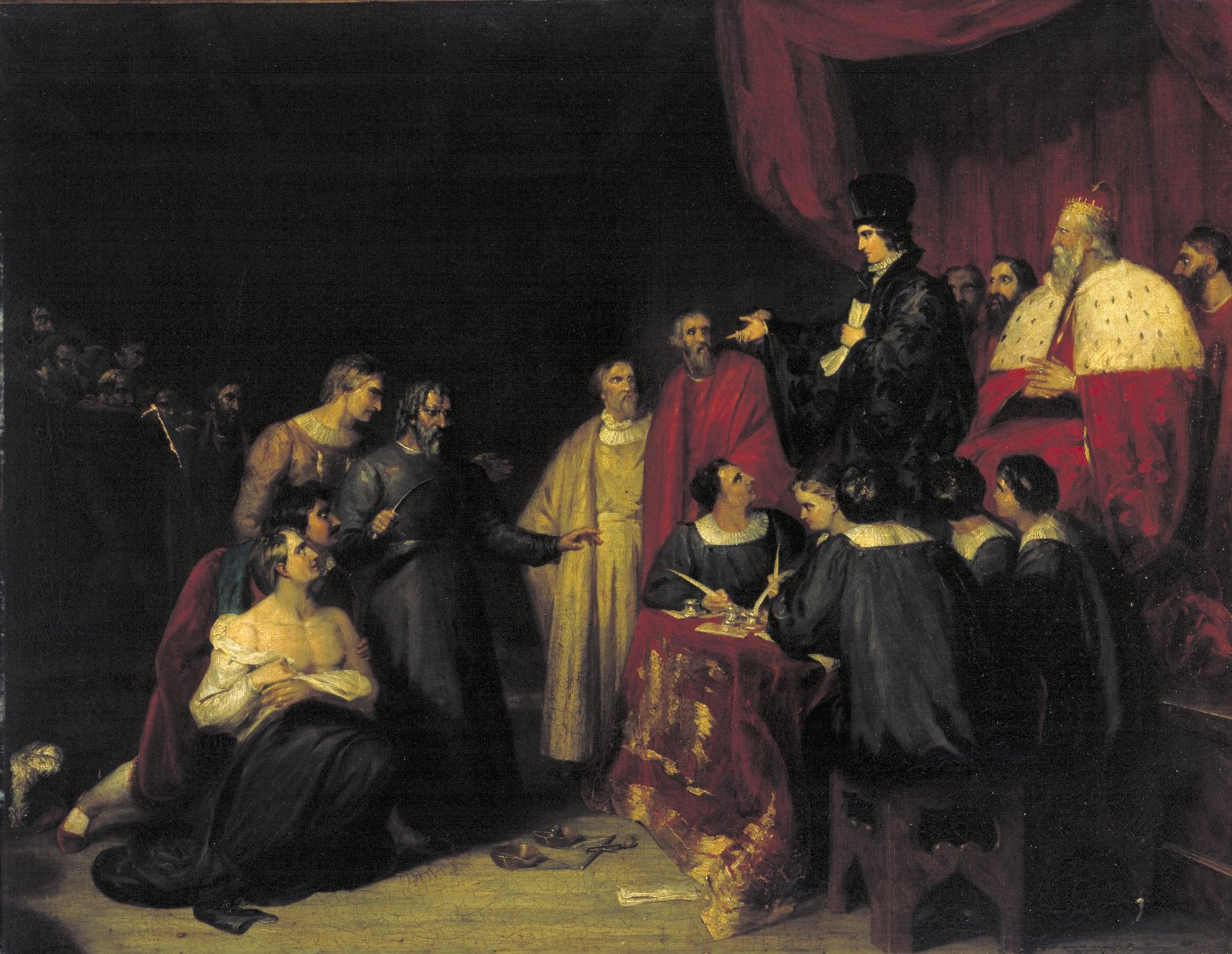
Portia pronouncing sentence, c. 1830–1831

Frank Howard (1805?–1866) was the son of Henry Howard, an artist.

== Biography ==
Howard was born in about 1805, the son of Henry Howard R.A. He was born in Poland Street in London. He was trained in art by his father and as a student of the Royal Academy. He became an assistant of Sir Thomas Lawrence and exhibited at the British Institution from 1824 to 1843 and at the Royal Academy in 1825, when he sent 'Othello and Desdemona' and three portraits, and he continued to exhibit portraits and Shakespearean and poetical subjects until 1833. In 1827 he commenced the publication of a series of clever outline plates, entitled 'The Spirit of the Plays of Shakespeare,' which was completed in 1833.

After the death of Lawrence he exhibited again at the Academy in 1842. He sent The Adoration of the Magi, Suffer little Children to come unto Me, and The Rescue of Cymbeline. He contributed in the same year to the British Institution 'Spenser's Faerie Queene, containing Portraits of Queen Elizabeth and her Court.' In 1843 he sent three cartoons to Westminster Hall in competition for the prizes offered in connection with the rebuilding of the Houses of Parliament, and for one, 'Una coming to seek the assistance of Gloriana,' an allegory of the reformed religion seeking the aid of England, suggested by Spenser's Faerie Queene, he was awarded one of the extra prizes of 100 pounds.

In 1847 he moved to Liverpool, where he earned a livelihood by painting and teaching drawing, lecturing on art and writing articles for a local newspaper. Howard died on 29 June 1866 in Liverpool.

== Works include ==
- The Sketcher's Manual, 1837
- Colour as a Means of Art, 1838,
- The Science of Drawing, 1839-40
- Imitative Art, 1840.
