= Adrian Skeggs =

Australian rugby union player (born 1963)

- Full name: Adrian Lisle Skeggs
- Born: 28 September 1963 (age 63) Lord Howe Island, Australia
- Height: 190 cm (6 ft 3 in)
- Weight: 116 kg (256 lb)
- School: The Armidale School

Rugby union career
- Position: Prop
International career
Years	Team	Apps	(Points)
1993	Australia		

Adrian Lisle Skeggs (born 28 September 1963) is an Australian former rugby union player.

== Biography ==
Born and raised on Lord Howe Island, Skeggs came to the mainland in eighth grade to board at The Armidale School, where he was versed in rugby by ex-Wallaby John Hipwell. He was developed into a second rower and had multiple years as a NSW Country Schools representative. Pursuing further studies in Sydney, Skeggs joined Warringah and it was there that he was switched to the front row, becoming a specialist tighthead prop.

Skeggs made his New South Wales representative debut in 1989 against the touring British Lions, the first of his 19 Waratahs caps. He relocated to Brisbane and joined Brothers in 1991, going on to earn Queensland representative honours his first season. In 1993, Skeggs won a Wallabies call up for the end of year tour to Canada and France, as injury cover for prop Dan Crowley. He made one uncapped appearance in Canada before being recalled home, with Crowley becoming available for the France leg of the tour. In 1994, Skeggs was a member of the Queensland side that won the 1994 Super 10 grand final against Natal. He finished his career with 41 Queensland caps.

After two years playing in South Africa with Natal, Skeggs held several coaching positions in England, which included a stint as head coach of Division One club Worcester. He worked with Namibia's front row at the 2003 World Cup.

In 2024, Skeggs returned to Lord Howe Island with his family.
