= James Keith Bain =

Australian farmer and author (1929–2022)

- Born: 1 October 1929
- Died: 9 September 2022 (aged 92)
- Education: The Armidale School; Scots College
- Occupations: Businessman, farmer, author
- Known for: Chairman of W. Bain & Co.; chairman of the Sydney Stock Exchange

James Keith Bain AM (1 October 1929 – 9 September 2022) was an Australian businessman, farmer, and author. He was chairman of W. Bain & Co. (1947–1987), Merryville Estates Pty Ltd, Sydney Stock Exchange Ltd (1983–1987) and the NatWest Aust. Bank Ltd (1985–1991).

Bain attended both The Armidale School and Scots College.

Bain retired as a senior partner of Bain & Company in 1986–1987, and a few years later (1992) it was acquired by Deutsche Bank; Jim Bain was a grandson of the founder. In retirement, he wrote about his experiences in the Australian financial industry. Bain died on 9 September 2022, at the age of 92.

== Works ==
- Bain, James (2001). The remarkable roller coaster : forty years in the Australian finance industry. Pymble, N.S.W.: HarperCollins. ISBN 9780732264437.
- Bain, Jim (2007). A financial tale of two cities : Sydney and Melbourne's remarkable contest for commercial supremacy. Sydney, N.S.W.: UNSW Press. ISBN 978-0868409634.
