= Shiffner baronets =

Baronetcy in the Baronetage of the United Kingdom

- Escutcheon of the Shiffner baronets of Coombe
- Creation date: 1818
- Status: vacant

The Shiffner Baronetcy, of Coombe in the County of Sussex, is a title in the Baronetage of the United Kingdom. It was created on 16 December 1818 for George Shiffner, Member of Parliament for Lewes from 1812 to 1826.

== Shiffner baronets, of Coombe (1818) ==
- Sir George Shiffner, 1st Baronet (1762–1842)
- Sir Henry Shiffner, 2nd Baronet (1788–1859)
- Sir George Shiffner, 3rd Baronet (1791–1863)
- Sir George Croxton Shiffner, 4th Baronet (1819–1906)
- Sir John Shiffner, 5th Baronet (1857–1914)
- Sir John Bridger Shiffner, 6th Baronet (1899–1918)
- Sir Henry Burrowes Shiffner, 7th Baronet (1902–1941)
- Sir Henry David Shiffner, 8th Baronet (1930–2018)
- Sir Michael George Edward Shiffner, 9th Baronet (born 1963). While he succeeded to the title in 2018, he has not officially taken it up.

The heir presumptive is the current holder's cousin, Rear-Adm. John Robert Shiffner (born 1941). The heir presumptive's heir apparent is his son John Edward Shiffner (born 1971).

== Notes ==
Baronetage of the United Kingdom
Preceded by Stracey baronets	Shiffner baronets of Coombe; 16 December 1818	Succeeded by Croft baronets
