= Sir John Croft, 1st Baronet =

Sir John Croft, 1st Baronet, DL, FRS (1778–1862) was an English diplomat, and spy for Wellington against Napoleon.

== Life ==
He was born in Porto, Portugal, the son of John Croft, merchant, and Henrietta Maria, daughter of James Tunstall. He was educated in a British school run by an Anglican clergyman Dr. Bell, who taught his pupils fluency in six languages. In 1795, at his father's request, Jack (his nickname), joined the family Port house. Five years later he sailed to London to become a scientist. His first work was as an assistant to Humphry Davy, the inventor of the miners' safety lamp. In 1803 he went to assist the botanist Joseph Banks. Croft was later admitted to the Royal Society, with recommendations by Davy and Banks and Peter Mark Roget. In 1814 he was also appointed an Associate of The Royal Academy of Science in Lisbon.

In 1810 in the midst of the Peninsular Wars he met Charles Stuart, the British Minister to Portugal, who invited him to undertake a six-month espionage operation along the entire north coast of Spain from Corunna to the French border. His task was to organise a network of agents to report details of French troop movements to Stuart who, in turn, would sort them and pass them to Wellington.

The following year Charles Stuart appointed Croft as the joint leader of the British Government Distribution Fund whose challenge was to provide aid to desolate Portuguese villagers in the war-torn villages. He quickly took charge of the operation and with his team of 16 volunteers provided blankets, clothing, food, medicines, livestock, etc. to 77,000 families.

In 1814 the Portuguese Regent awarded him the Order of the Tower and Sword, four years later he was awarded a baronetcy, and in 1854 Portugal remembered him again with the title of Barão da Serra da Estrela (Serra d'Estrella in old Portuguese writing).

Letters and documents confirming this history are contained in the archives of The Fladgate Partnership, Vila Nova de Gaia, Portugal and the Croft family records, as well as in the Factory House.

Baronetage of the United Kingdom
New creation	Baronet (of Cowling Hall); 1816–1862	Succeeded by John Croft
