= The Armidale School =

Independent Anglican school in New South Wales, Australia

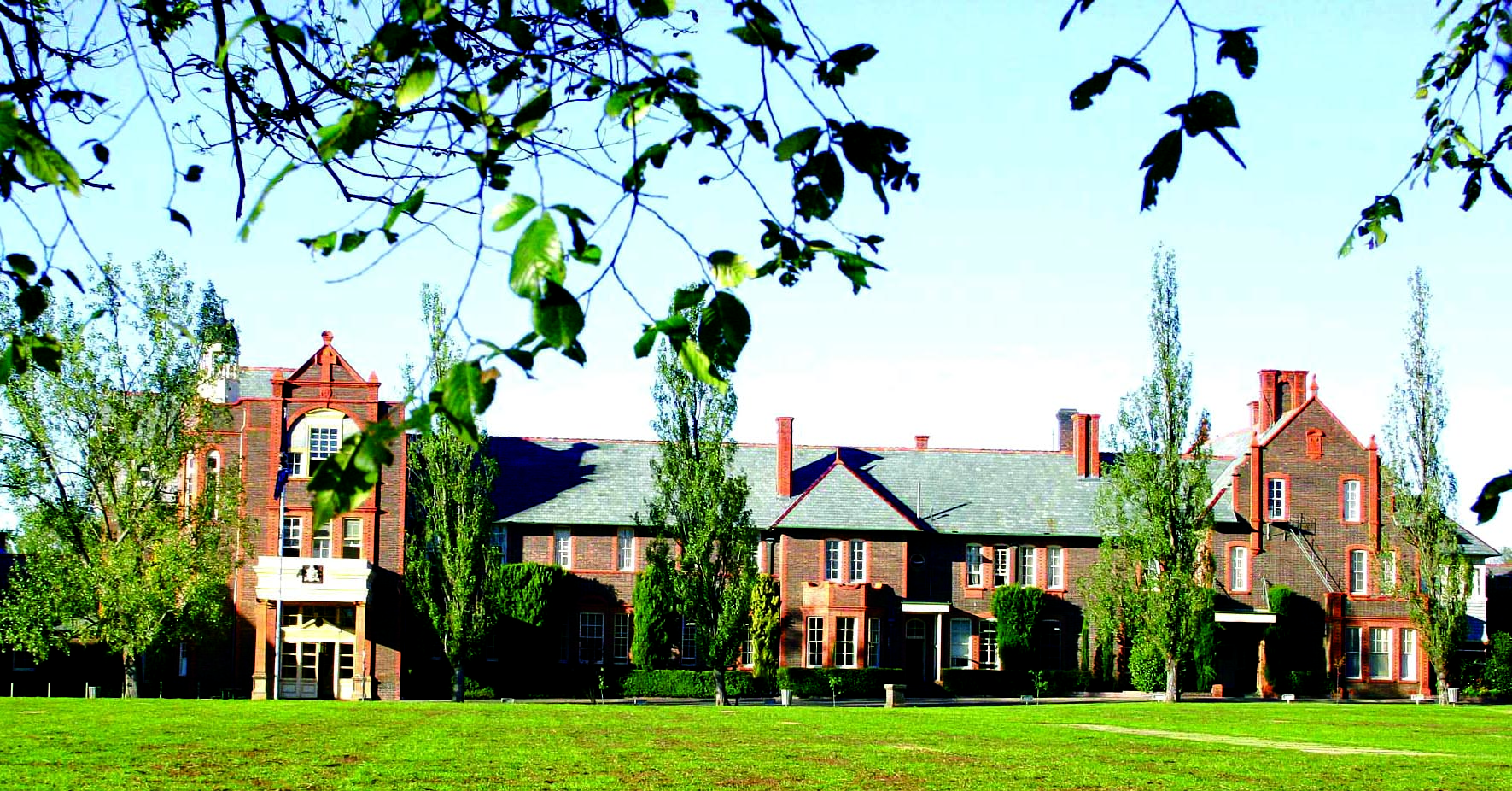
- The main building of The Armidale School, designed by Sir John Sulman in 1892

Location
- Armidale, New South Wales; Australia; 30°31′13″S 151°40′26″E

Information
- Former name: New England Proprietary School
- Type: Independent co-educational early learning, primary and secondary day and boarding school
- Motto: Latin: Absque Deo Nihil (Without God, Nothing)
- Denomination: Anglicanism
- Established: 1894; 132 years ago
- Educational authority: New South Wales Education Standards Authority
- Chairman: Mr Sebastian Hempel
- Principal: Mr Ray Pearson
- Chaplain: Rev Joanne Benham
- Employees: ~127
- Grades: Early learning and K–12
- Enrolment: 682 (2022)
- Campus type: Regional
- Colours: Navy blue and straw
- Slogan: "The One for All," or "Explore, Experience, Excel."
- Athletics: Athletic Association of the Great Public Schools of New South Wales
- Affiliations: Association of Heads of Independent Schools of Australia; Junior School Heads Association of Australia; Australian Boarding Schools' Association; Round Square Schools
- Alumni: Old Armidalians
- Website: www.as.edu.au

The Armidale School (abbreviated as TAS) is an independent, Anglican, co-educational, Pre K–12 boarding school located in Armidale, New South Wales, Australia.

Founded in 1894 as the New England Proprietary School, TAS uses a non-selective enrolment policy. As of 2026, approximately 625 students were enrolled, including around 225 boarders from years 6 to 12. The school includes a preschool (ages 4 and above), a Junior School (Kindergarten to Year 5), offering the International Baccalaureate Primary Years Programme), a Middle School (Years 6–8), and a Senior School (Years 9–12).

The school is affiliated with the Association of Heads of Independent Schools of Australia (AHISA), the Junior School Heads Association of Australia, and the Australian Boarding Schools Association. It is also one of three Round Square schools in New South Wales. It is also a member of the Athletic Association of the Great Public Schools of New South Wales (AAGPS).

== History ==
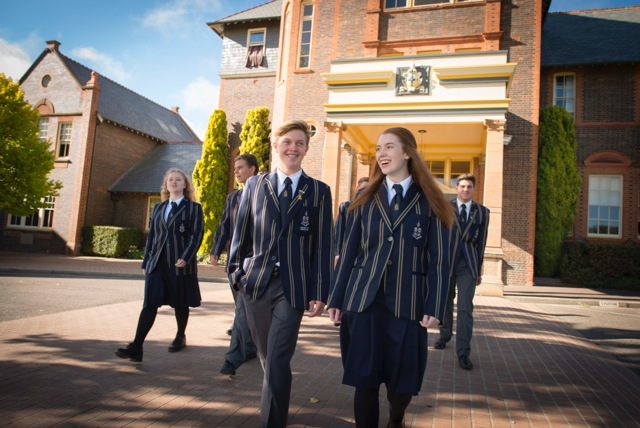
TAS admitted its first senior girls in late 2015 ahead of full co-education the year after.

The Armidale School was founded in 1894 as a boarding school, mainly for the sons of the gentry. The school's origins can be traced to 1838, when Patrick Grant, a magistrate at Maitland, initially conceived the idea of a proprietary school for boys in the Hunter Valley. This idea was taken up by prominent members of the Church of England in the northern districts of New South Wales, and £500 was obtained from the Society for Promoting Christian Knowledge. This was the result of the efforts of the first (and only) Bishop of Australia, William Grant Broughton. A site for the school was purchased at Honeysuckle Point in Newcastle in 1840. The property was transferred to William Tyrrell (the first Bishop of Newcastle) in 1846. Finally, in 1854, the land was resumed by the Hunter River Railway Company.

By 1877, the school had still not been established, and Tyrrell continued advocating for the school's establishment. Thus, a plan was created with land selected at Blandford, near Murrurundi. In 1881, it was determined that the Blandford plan was too costly, and a suggestion was made that instead it should be built on the New England Tablelands at Armidale. The additional required capital of £6,000 was raised by James Ross, Archdeacon of Armidale, and his leading laymen.

The foundation stone of the main building, designed by noted architect Sir John Sulman, was laid on 22 February 1893 by the Governor of New South Wales, the Rt. Hon. Victor Albert George, Earl of Jersey. The Opening Ceremony was performed by the Rt. Rev Arthur Vincent Green, Bishop of Grafton and Armidale, on 15 May 1894.

The names of the company and school were changed in 1896 to The Armidale School. In the same year, TAS joined the AAGPS in Sydney.

In 1950, the school site was transferred to the trustees of the Church of England Diocese of Armidale, and was administered by a School Council comprising members from the Diocese, Old Boys' Union, and P&F through to 2009.

On 1 January 2010, the school was incorporated as a company limited by guarantee under the Corporations Act with the name "The Armidale School."

In March 2015, the school announced it would commence full co-education and began taking enrolments for Year 12 students, who would begin tuition in October 2015, and for Year 6–11 students, to begin tuition in 2016. This expanded upon the Junior School, which became co-educational in 1989, and was announced following a nine-week consultation process. The school year began in 2016 with 53 girls, including 14 boarders, and the first female students to complete their entire education at the school did so in 2022.

== Headmasters ==
Period	Details
1894–1906	W A Fisher
1906–1910	A H Reynolds
1910–1912	Ven Archdeacon T K Abbott
1913–1918	Frederick Perkins
1918–1919	Canon J Forster
1919–1926	Canon H. K. Archdall
1927–1934	H Sanger
1936–1939	H P Young
1940–1961	G.A. Fisher
1962–1982	A H Cash
1982–1986	G C S Andrews
1987–1997	K Langford-Smith
1998–2019	Murray L Guest
2020–2021	Alan Jones
2021–2024	Rachel Horton (hereafter the role known as Principal)
2024–	Ray Pearson

== Campus ==
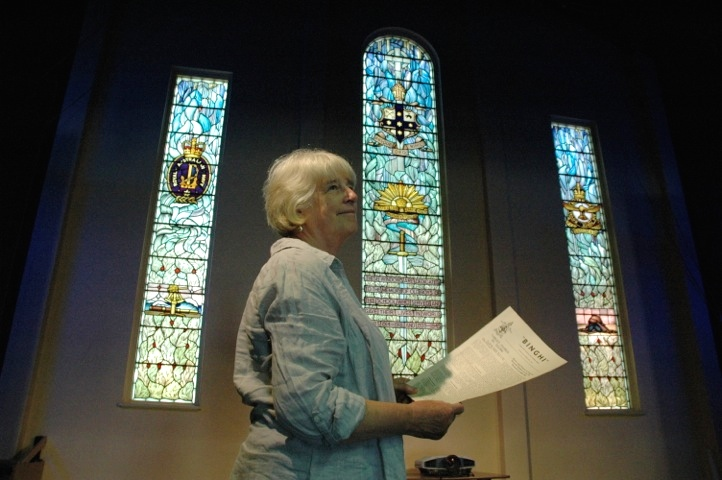
Napier Waller historian Dr Bronwyn Hughes inspects the Memorial Windows in the TAS Assembly Hall.

The campus covers 25 hectares and is in Armidale, a university city on the New England Tablelands of New South Wales, midway between Sydney and Brisbane. The school has a mix of historic and modern buildings, all of which reflect design elements of the original building designed by the architect John Sulman in 1892. Other notable buildings are the Chapel, designed by Cyril Blacket and constructed in 1902, and the War Memorial Assembly Hall, which features three large stained-glass windows designed by Napier Waller.

The Michael Hoskins Creative Arts Centre has a 240-seat performing arts theatre, drama classrooms, and visual arts studios. The centre is used by local and visiting performing arts organisations. The school has an indoor swimming pool, rifle range, cattle stud, gymnasium, library, music centre, computer rooms, climbing wall, weights room, an indoor cricket centre, indoor and outdoor basketball courts, seven tennis courts, sports fields, and cricket wickets.

=== Boarding ===
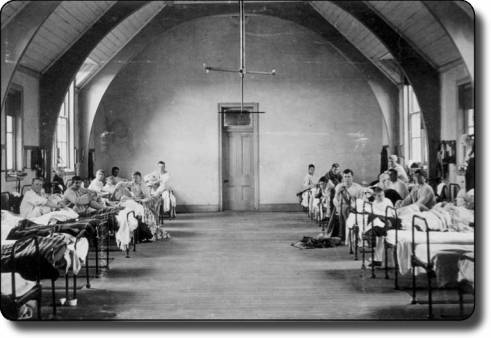
TAS dormitory, 1898

TAS has six school boarding houses, named Abbott, Croft, Dangar, Tyrrell, White, and the new 64 bed 'Girls Boarding House'. Broughton house was a boarding house from 1964 to 1998, when it was reassigned as a house for day-boys.

The senior boys' boarding houses (Abbott, Croft and Tyrrell) each accommodate up to 60 students, with 10 to 15 boys in each year group. In the lower years, boys are accommodated in dormitories, and as they progress through the school are moved into private study/bedrooms. Middle School boys are accommodated in White House, while Middle School girl boarders reside in Dangar House, the school's original primary school.

Originally, all girls boarding at the school lived in the renovated Dangar House. The school constructed a new boarding house in 2018 to accommodate more girls.

== Co-curricular Activities ==
Co-curricular activities available to TAS students include: Debating and public speaking, drama, band, orchestra, choirs, art, photography, Duke of Edinburgh's Award Scheme, and a school Poll Hereford stud which exhibits cattle at local and regional agricultural shows. Annual theatrical productions are staged in the School's Hoskins Centre theatre; previous productions include The Addams Family (2018), Oliver! (2019), Wizard of Oz (2019), Sweeney Todd (2020), Rhinoceros (2022) and Legally Blonde (2023).

=== Community service ===
Year 8 students may volunteer for a service trip to St Christopher's Orphanage in Fiji, where they participate in the upkeep and daily maintenance of the orphanage and establish friendships with the children. In the past, a similar Christian service trip has been offered to Year 10 and 11 students to Thailand, assisting at the McKean Leprosy Rehabilitation Centre and the Agape AIDS Orphanage near Chiang Mai.

=== Sport ===
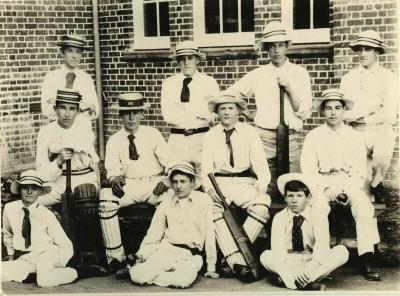
TAS 1st XI Cricket Team, 1895

The Armidale School is one of the nine members of the Athletic Association of the Great Public Schools of New South Wales (GPS) and participates in GPS sporting competitions as well as several non-GPS or traditional sports. Students may participate in a variety of sports including: athletics, basketball, canoeing, cricket, cross country, hockey, mountain biking, netball, rugby union, rifle shooting, soccer, squash, rowing, swimming, tennis, triathlon, volleyball and water polo.

The school hosts the TAS Rugby Carnival annually in April; with over 40 participating school and club teams, it is recognized as largest rugby event for primary-aged players in Australia.

The school also holds a swimming carnival and an athletics carnival once a year, with students participating in inter-house competition. Boarding students compete for either Abbott, Croft or Tyrrell house, while day students are members of Broughton, Green or Ross houses. Green and Ross were inaugurated in 1983 by Prince Edward, during a private visit to the school. Inter-house competitions are also held for debating, public speaking, and the creative arts.

=== Music ===
The Armidale School often takes part in music competitions like the Armidale Eisteddfod.

== Outdoor education ==
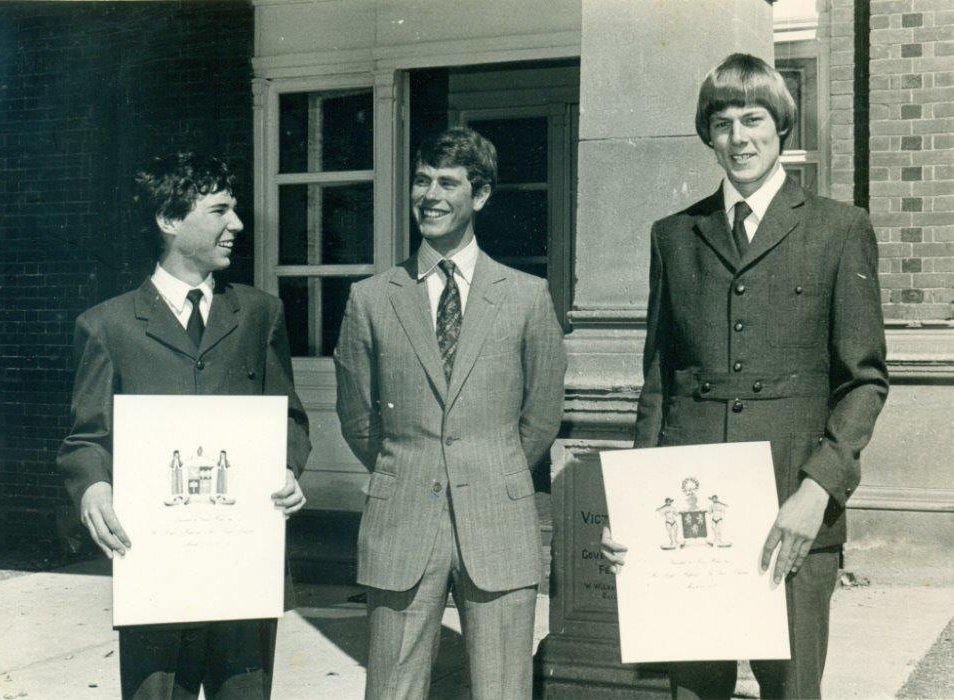
Prince Edward inaugurates the first Day Houses, Green and Ross, during a private visit to the school in 1983. The captains are wearing the Norfolk Jacket, the school's formal uniform at the time.

Pupils at the school can take part in abseiling, whitewater kayaking and making bivouac shelters.

=== Rural Fire Service ===
In 1970, TAS became the first school in NSW to offer bush firefighter training, originally as part of the service component for the school's Duke of Edinburgh Award. The school's RFS program aims to produce students who are competent in aspects of bush firefighting, and who obtain a Bush Firefighting (BF) qualification. The activity is carried out with the Dumaresq Brigade of the NSW Rural Fire Service New England Zone and at the RFS' Armidale Fire Training Centre.

=== Surf Life Saving ===
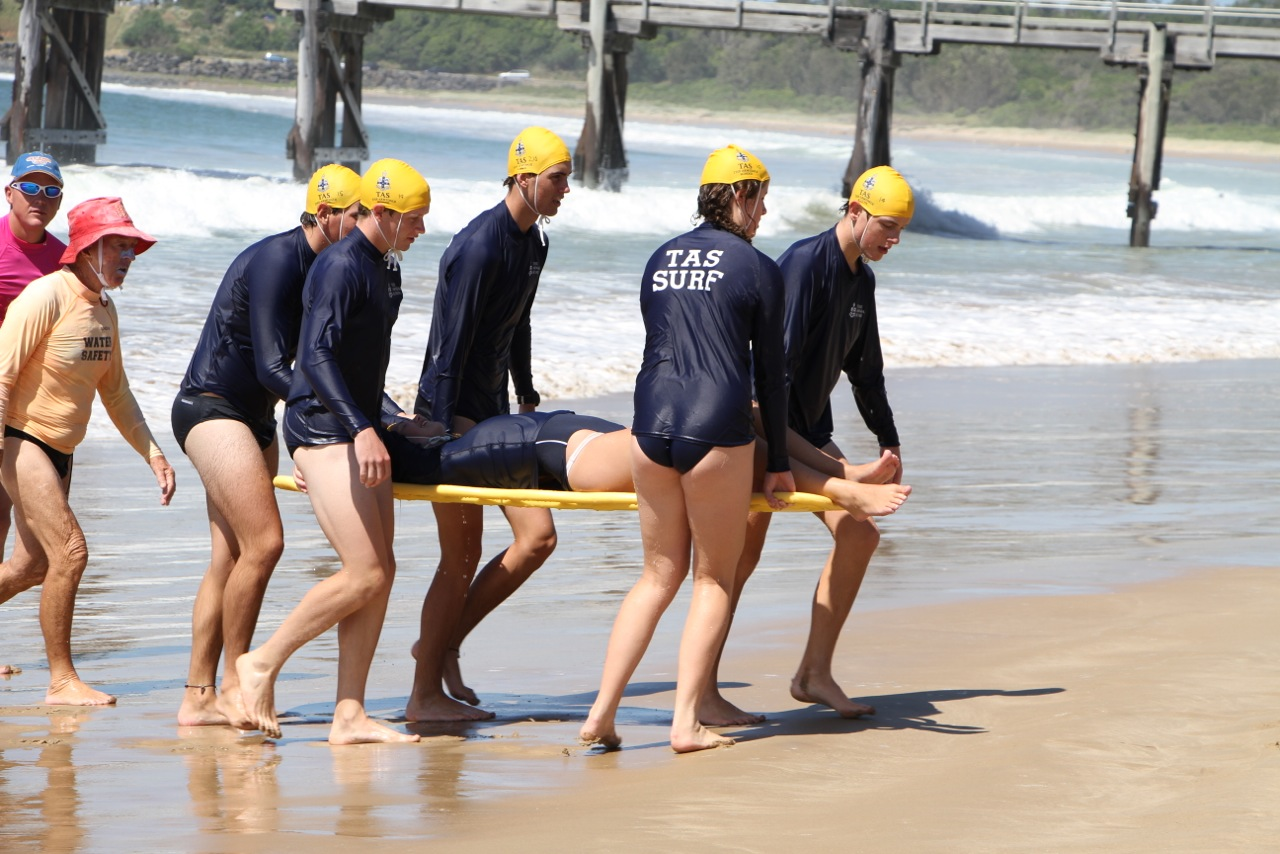
TAS students undertake Surf Life Saving qualifications in conjunction with Sawtell Surf Life Saving Club.

Surf life saving commenced at TAS in 1967, as a service component for the Duke of Edinburgh Award Scheme introduced at the school earlier that year. For the first few years, the training was done at Nambucca Heads, and, during the 1990s, with Yamba SLSC. Currently, TAS has a relationship with Sawtell SLSC. Students spend 10 days at Sawtell SLSC during the year, with five days of training and assessment in November. This leads to an examination for the RLSSA Surf Life Saving Bronze Medallion.

== Round Square ==
TAS is a member of Round Square, an international institution of more than 200 schools worldwide which subscribes to the philosophy of Kurt Hahn (1886–1974), a renowned educationalist, who founded the idea of experiential education through such initiatives as the Duke of Edinburgh's Award Scheme and Outward Bound. The philosophy is based on five pillars or IDEALS: Internationalism, Democracy, Environment, Adventure, Leadership and Service. The Round Square network affords member schools the opportunity to arrange local and international student and teacher exchanges on a regular basis between their schools. Students and staff also have the opportunity to participate in local and international community service projects and conferences.

== Controversy ==
In recent years there have been several allegations of sexual misconduct at the school, both recent and historical. This includes instances of both teachers and boarding staff sexually abusing students in their care, and teachers owning child pornography — though it did not involve the students.

Historically, the school faced challenges and had a reputation for bullying, racism and homophobia amongst the all-male students, particularly those who boarded at the school.

In late 2015, the school became co-ed and opened its doors to girls for the first time in its 123-year history. Despite popularity and strong demand, TAS girls were not warmly welcomed by many in the community, including the Old Boys Union and parents at the school. In the early days of co-education at TAS, there were frequent revisions to the girls' uniforms due to parental concerns, as well as extra safety measures in place for the girls.

== Notable alumni ==
Alumni of The Armidale School are referred to generally as Old Armidalians, Old Boys or Old Girls (following the introduction of co-education in 2015) and may elect to join the schools' alumni association, the Old Armidalians' Union (formerly TAS Old Boys' Union). Some notable Old Armidalians include:

=== Rhodes scholar ===
- Robert Clarence Robertson-Cuninghame – later Chancellor of the University of New England

=== Arts, media, and entertainment ===
- Alex Buzo – playwright
- Ian Kiernan AO – environmentalist and around the world yachtsman (also attended The Scots College)
- David Morrow OAM - media sports broadcaster with the Australian Broadcasting Corporation and Radio 2GB.
- Nigel Brennan – photojournalist and author who was kidnapped by Islamist insurgents in Somalia in 2008 and held hostage for 15 months
- Ben Mingay – TV and film actor
- Angus Sampson – TV and film actor who appeared in Kokoda and Thank God You're Here (he also attended PLC Sydney and Trinity College)

=== Business ===
Adam Howie "Curly" Brydon -

Brydon established Diners' Club in Australia in 1956 and was later a senior newspaper executive

and director in Sydney, Melbourne and New York for more than 20 years.

1960-1970 Senior executive, later Director, with News Limited, Sydney

1970-1977 Senior executive with Herald & Weekly Times and HSV 7, Melbourne

1977-1979 Vice president, Director Operations New York Post, New York

1979-1985 Vice president, General Manager and Director News Group Publications, New York

1985 Retired from News Corporation in New York and returned to Sydney

- James Keith Bain AM – company director, farmer, author, chairman of Merryville Estates Pty Ltd, NatWest Aust. Bank Ltd (1985–91), Bain & Company (1947–87), Sydney Stock Exchange (1983–87) (also attended The Scots College)

=== Politics, public service and the law ===
- Kina Bona KBE – Judge, National and Supreme Courts of Papua New Guinea
- Michael Bruxner – leader of the New South Wales Country Party, Deputy Premier and Member of the NSW Parliament from 1920 to 1962
- Leslie Morshead KCB, KBE, CMG, DSO, ED – military leader who led the Australian and British troops at the Siege of Tobruk (1941) and at the Second Battle of El Alamein (TAS Staff)
- George Souris – former Member of NSW Parliament for State seat of Upper Hunter and former NSW Government Minister
- Dave Layzell – Member of NSW Parliament for State seat of Upper Hunter – NSW Nationals
- William Wentworth AO – Liberal and then independent member of the Australian House of Representatives for the seat of Mackellar, Minister for Social Services and Minister for Aboriginal Affairs

=== Sport ===
- Adam Howie "Curly" Brydon - racing driver and yachtman
- Greg Cornelsen – former rugby player capped 25 times for the Wallabies
- Sir Bernard Croft Bt. – played Rugby Union for Australia in the 1928 New Zealand tour
- Allan Grice – racing driver and politician, most known for twice winning the Bathurst 1000, and Member for Broadwater in the Queensland Parliament from 1992 to 2001
- Joe Roff – former rugby player for the ACT Brumbies (1996–2004) and capped 86 times for the Wallabies
- Richard Tombs – former rugby player capped five times for the Wallabies
- Adrian Skeggs – former representative rugby player.

=== Other occupations ===
- Clifford M. Chard (active 1920s onward) – architect with the firm Kabbery and Chard
- Patrick Gordon Taylor – pioneering aviator and author
- Adam Howie "Curly' Brydon -
  * At 18 enlisted in RAAF in 1939, on the day after WW2 was declared * Hudson Bomber pilot (1940-42) in No.1 Squadron RAAF in Malaya, Singapore, Sumatra and Java. * Co-pilot in the first allied aircraft attack in the Pacific War against the Japanese in 1941 * Wounded in Java and to avoid being captured by the invading Japanese he escaped to Colombo on a Chinese river boat. * Australia’s youngest wartime Squadron Leader at the age of 22 years in 1943 * Kittyhawk Fighter pilot (1943-1944) in No.78 Squadron RAAF in South West Pacific Area * Awarded DFC and BAR in 1944 * Starring role in Department of Information 1944 film “ISLAND TARGET” * Fleet Air Arm Supermarine Seafire pilot (1945-1946) with RANVR & Royal Navy

== See also ==
- List of Anglican schools in New South Wales
- Anglican education in Australia
- List of boarding schools in Australia
- Lawrence Campbell Oratory Competition
