= Henry Howard (artist) =

English painter (1769–1847)

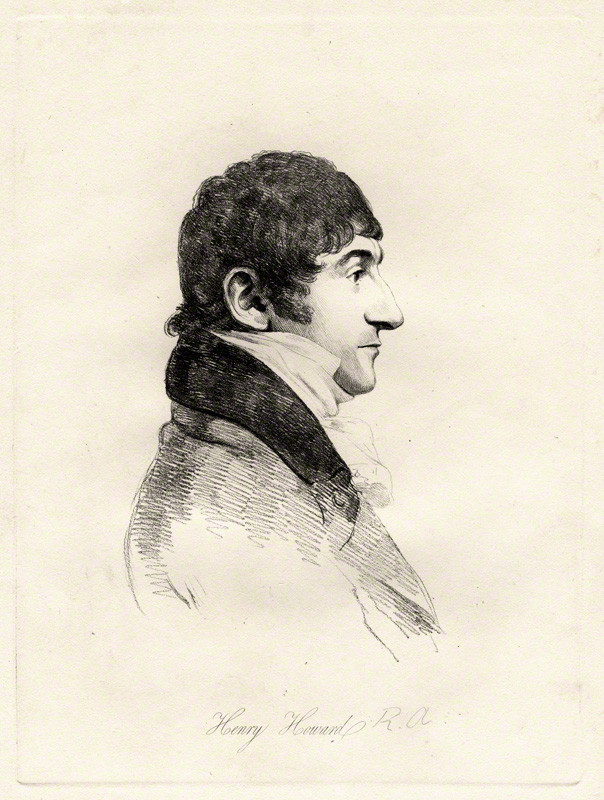
Portrait dated 1800 from the National Portrait Gallery

Henry Howard RA (31 January 1769 – 5 October 1847) was an early 19th-century British portrait and history painter.

== Biography ==
He was born in London and after being educated at a school in Hounslow, he started studying with the painter Philip Reinagle in 1786. In 1788 he began attending the Royal Academy Schools and was awarded a silver medal for drawing from life and a gold medal for historical painting for his Caractacus Recognising the Dead Body of his Son.

In March 1791, Howard traveled to Italy, France, and Switzerland. In Rome, he met and studied sculpture with John Flaxman and John Deare. In 1792 he painted a Dream of Cain. While abroad he applied to the Royal Academy for a grant after the bankruptcy of his father. Two years later, he returned to Britain by way of Vienna and Dresden. He began instructing Reinagle's daughter Jane in drawing and married her in 1803. Together they had four daughters and three sons. From 1806 they lived at 50 Newman Street, Westminster, until his death.

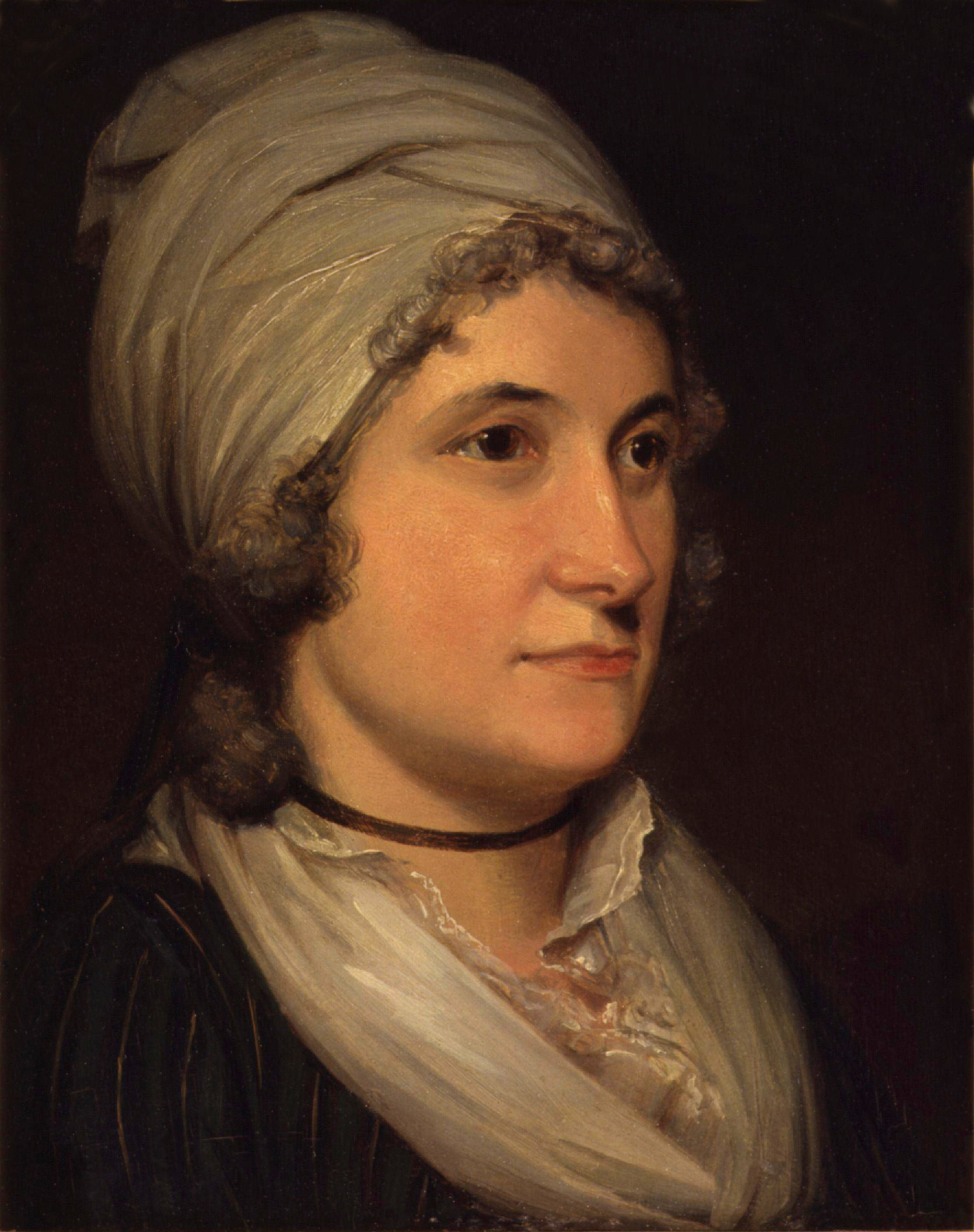
Anne, John Flaxman's wife, by Henry Howard, c.1797

In the 1790s Howard painted and drew a variety of subjects from literature, portraits, and drawings of sculpture. In 1795 and 1796, he submitted five such pictures to the Royal Academy, including a sketch from Milton's Paradise Lost. He illustrated Sharpe's British Essayists and Du Roveray's edition of Alexander Pope's translation of Homer. He also contributed designs for Josiah Wedgwood's pottery. Between 1799 and 1802, he made a series of drawings of sculpture. One series was published by the Dilettanti Society and one was made for the collector Charles Townley, the sculptor John Flaxman, and the Society of Engravers.

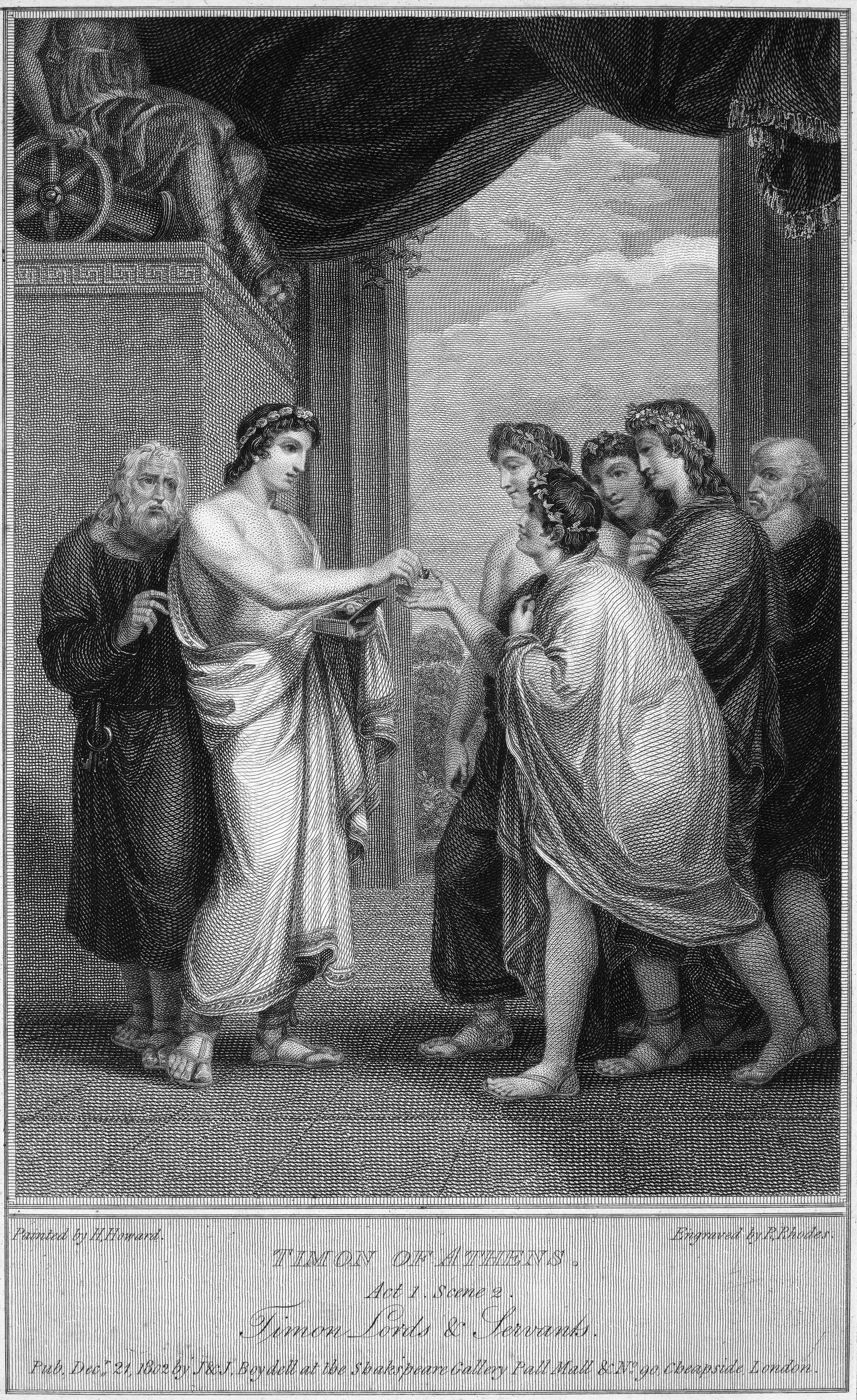
Timon of Athens: Act I, Scene 2: Timon's prodigality; engraved by R. Rhodes after a painting by Henry Howard (1802), for John Boydell's Shakespeare edition

Howard was elected an associate member of the Royal Academy and exhibited there until his death in 1847; he was elected a full member in 1808. In 1811 he became secretary of the Academy and in 1833 he was appointed professor of painting at the Schools (his lectures were published by his son, Frank in 1848). Howard's diploma work was The Four Angels Loosed from the Great River Euphrates. He painted a series of works from Milton's Comus and several subjects from the plays of William Shakespeare. In 1809 he exhibited Christ Blessing Young Children, which later became the altarpiece of St. Luke's, in Berwick St, Soho, London (demolished 1936). One of Howard's most important patrons was Lord Egremont, a significant collector.

While his history paintings were in a neo-classical academic style following Flaxman and others, his portraits continued the general tradition of English 18th-century portraiture and many of his portraits are in the National Gallery. His history paintings are hard to find on public display but his ceiling for the dining-room of the Sir John Soane's Museum, an Aurora adapted from Guido Reni (1837), can be seen obliquely.

In addition to his portraiture and historical painting, Howard worked on many decorative works. In 1805, a Mr. Hibbert commissioned him to paint a Cupid and Psyche frieze in 1814, along with several other artists. He painted large transparencies, apparently to be lighted from behind, for the "Grand Revolving Temple of Concord" built in Green Park for the visit of several sovereigns to celebrate (prematurely) the defeat of Napoleon. This was, according to some accounts, destroyed by, and according to others only saved by the cavalry from, "the multitudes of idle and dissolute spectators of all sorts". He also worked on a Solar System for the ceiling of Stafford House in 1835, then housing a superb art collection open to the public, as well as several other ceiling projects.

Howard died in Oxford on 5 October 1847 of "paralysis".

== Works ==
Two poetical illustrations of Howard's works were written by Letitia Elizabeth Landon. The first, of The Hours, in her Poetical Catalogue of Paintings in The Literary Gazette (1823), and the second, of Fairies on the Sea Shore in her Poetical Catalogue of Modern Paintings in her 1825 volume The Troubadour; Catalogue of Pictures, and Historical Sketches, this latter poem reappearing in The Cabinet of Modern Art, 1836 accompanied by an engraving (by Edward Goodall).

== Gallery ==
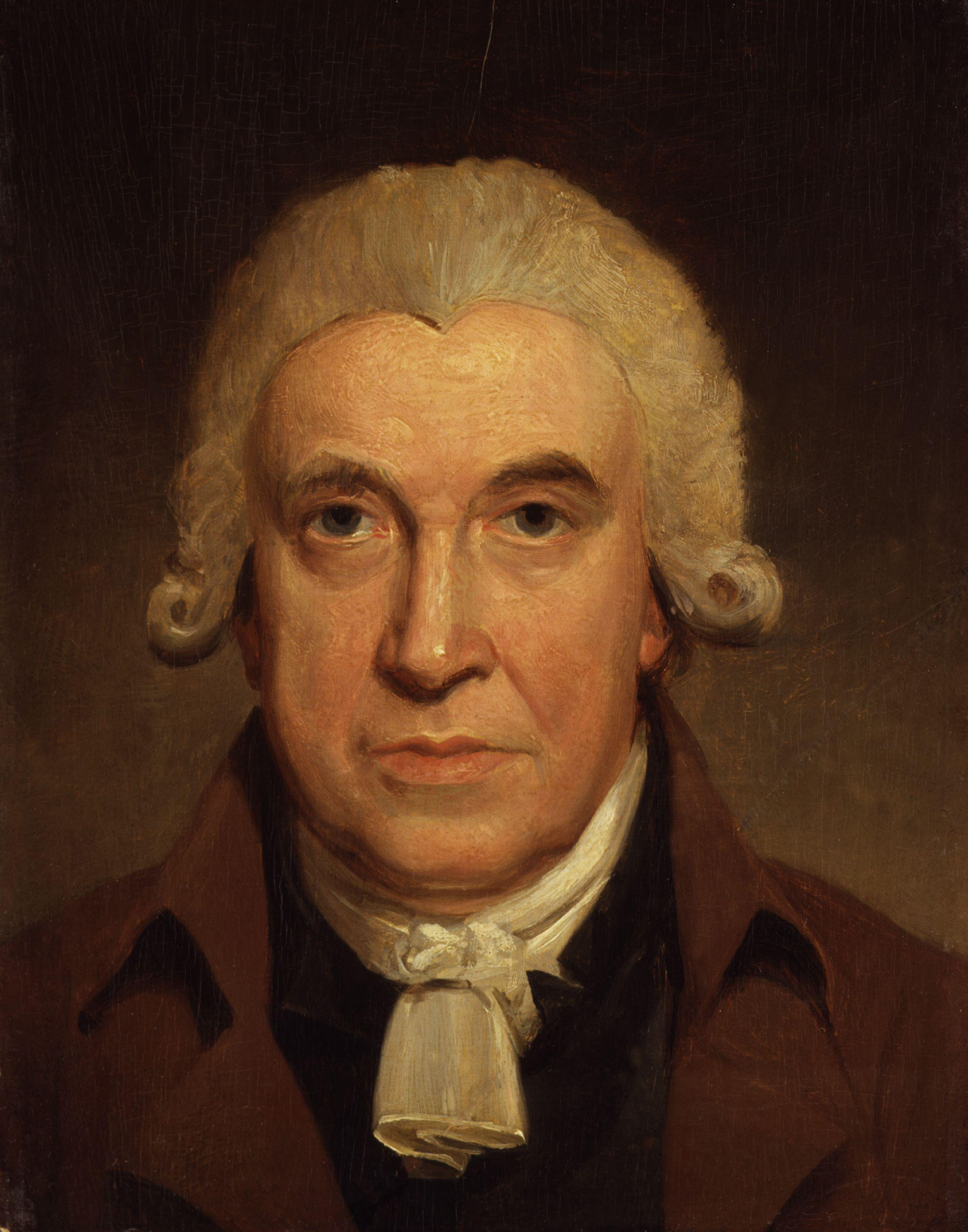
James Watt, 1797

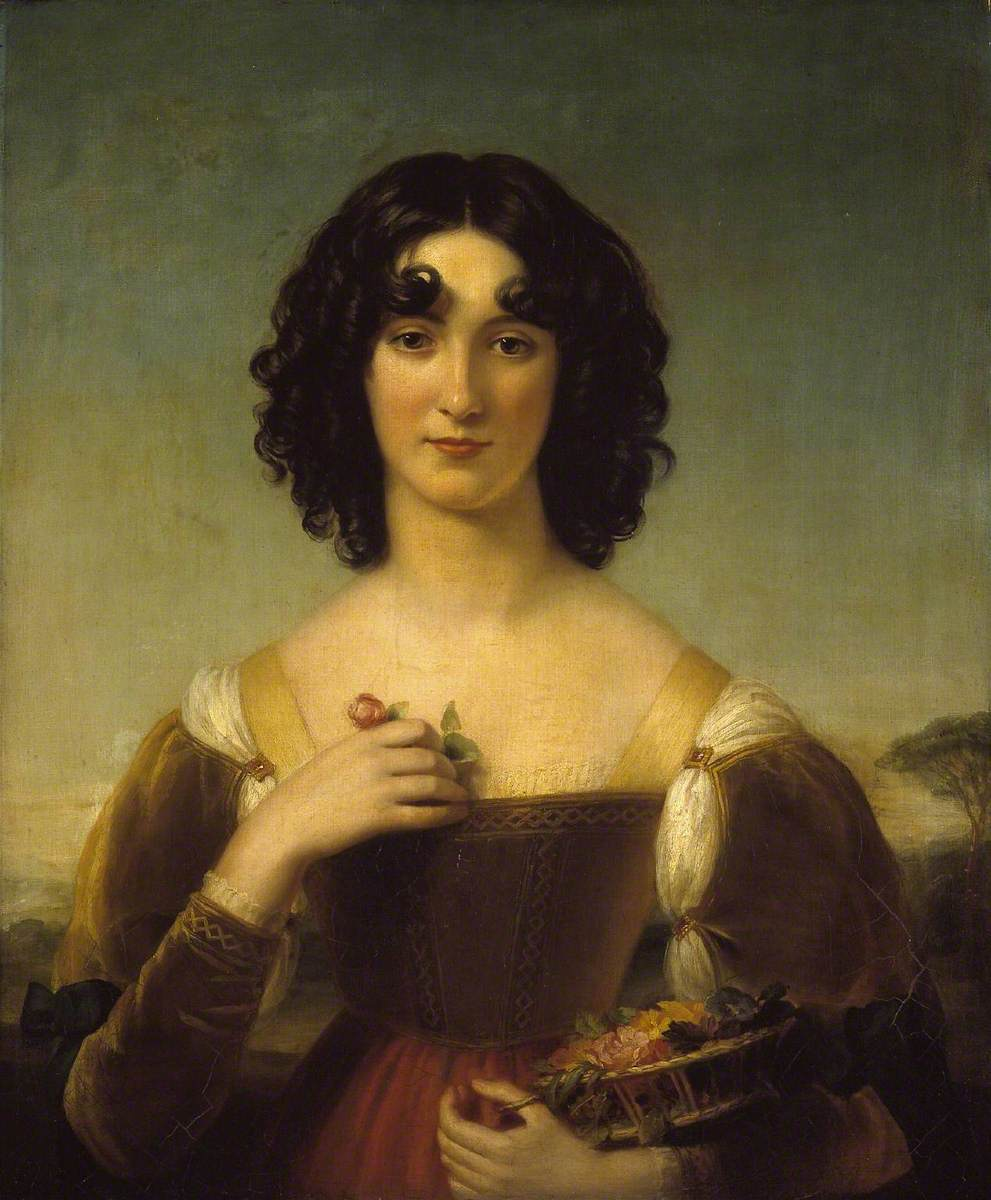
The Florentine Girl (‘The Artist’s Daughter’), 1827

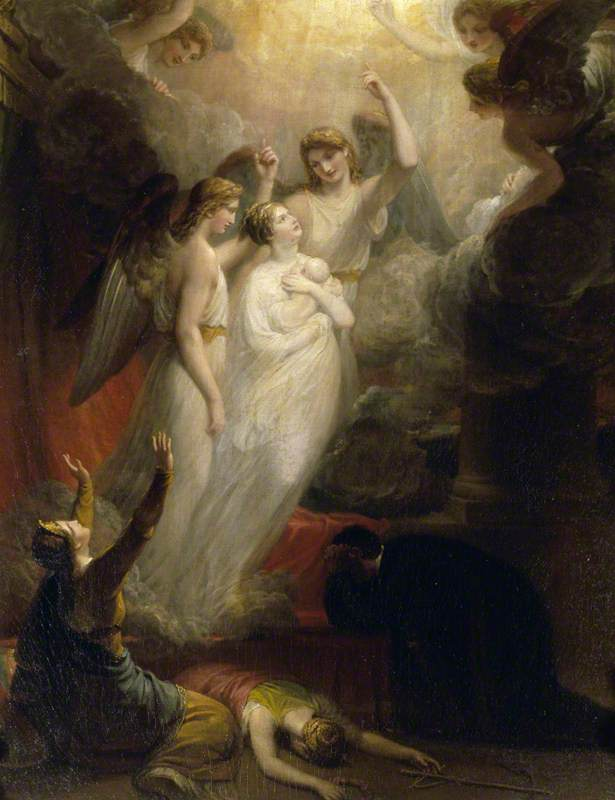
The Apotheosis of Princess Charlotte, 1818

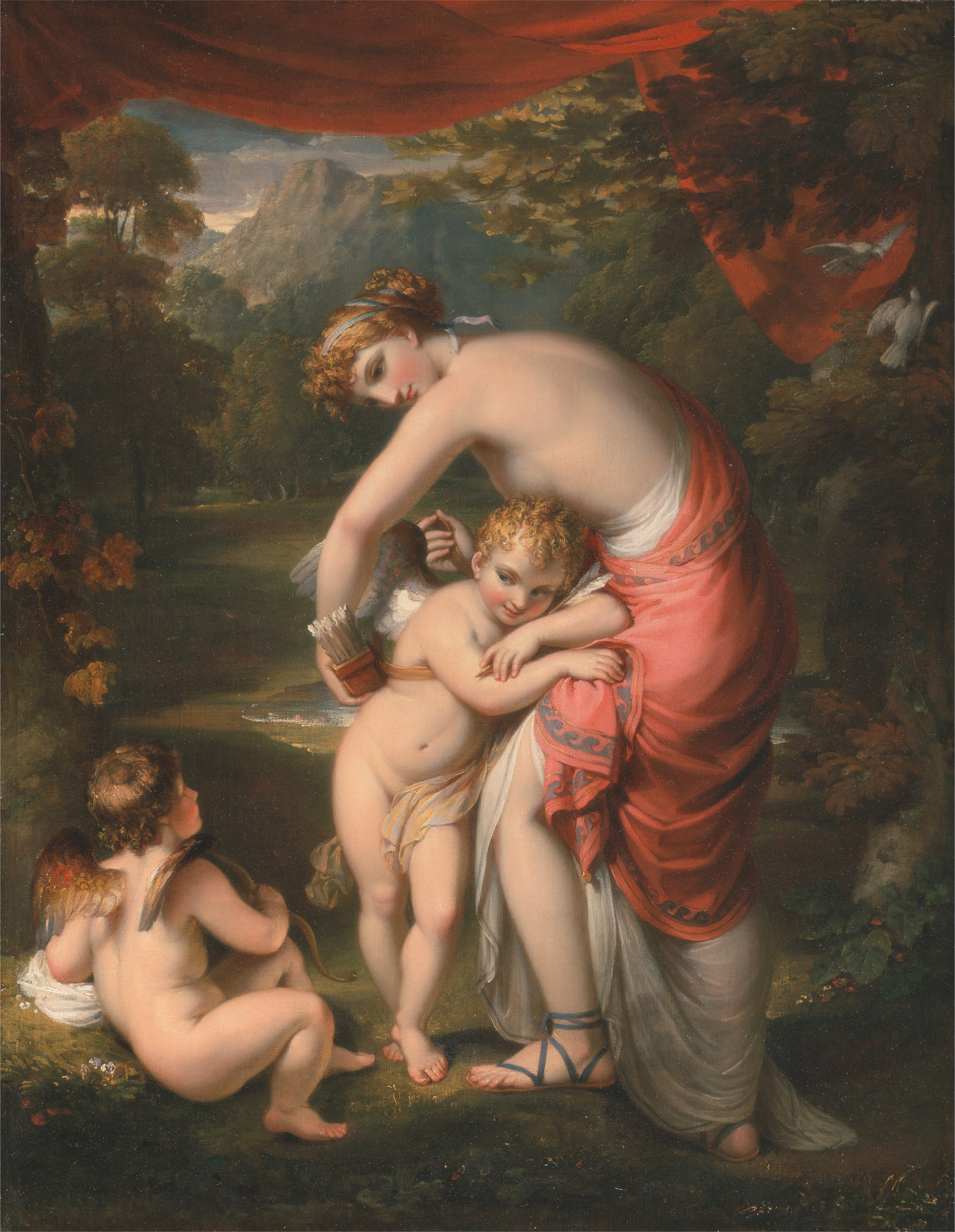
Venus and Cupid, 1809

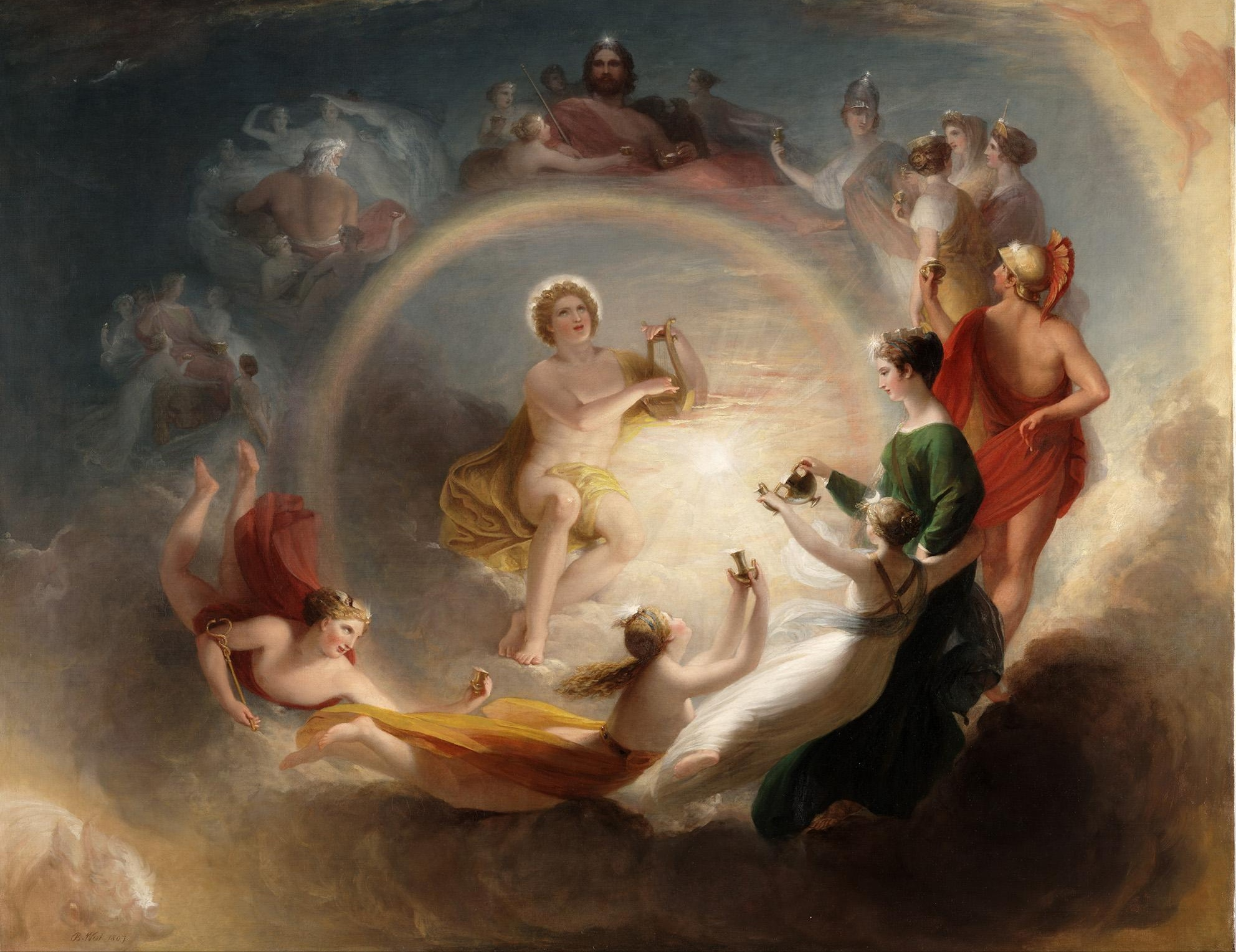
Apollo's enchantment

== Bibliography ==
- Graves, R. E. and Deborah Graham-Vernon. "Henry Howard". Oxford Dictionary of National Biography. Oxford University Press. 2004. Retrieved on 8 February 2008.
