= Croft baronets =

Set index for Croft baronets

There have been three baronetcies created for persons with the surname Croft, one in the Baronetage of England and two in the Baronetage of the United Kingdom. All three creations are extant as of 2026.

- Croft baronets of Croft Castle (1671)
- Croft baronets of Cowling Hall (1818)
- Croft baronets of Bournemouth (1924): see Baron Croft
