= The Apotheosis of Princess Charlotte =

Painting by Henry Howard

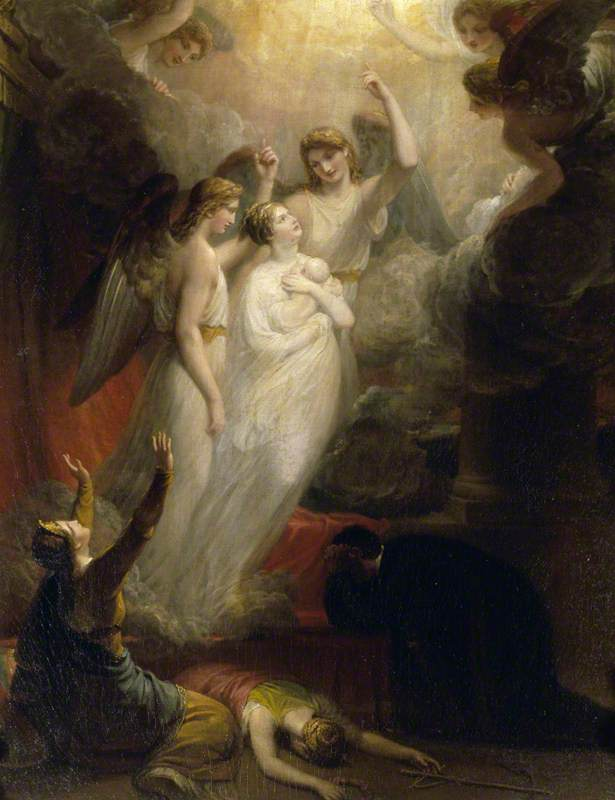
- Artist: Henry Howard
- Year: 1818
- Type: Oil on canvas, allegorical painting
- Dimensions: 91.5 cm × 71 cm (36.0 in × 28 in)
- Location: Petworth House; Sussex

The Apotheosis of Princess Charlotte is an 1818 oil painting by the British artist Henry Howard. It features an allegorical depiction of the apotheosis of Princess Charlotte of Wales. Charlotte, the only daughter and heir of the Prince Regent, had died in childbirth on 8 November 1817. She is shown ascending to heaven with her stillborn child wrapped in her arms in the company of two angels. The despairing figures below capture the widespread grief felt across Britain. The Whig opposition politician Henry Brougham remarked it was "as if every household in Great Britain had lost a favourite child".

The work was displayed at the annual exhibition of the British Institution in 1818. The painting was acquired by the aristocratic art collector George Wyndham, 3rd Earl of Egremont. It remains in the collection of his historic residence Petworth House in Sussex

== See also ==
- Portrait of Princess Charlotte of Wales, an 1817 painting by George Dawe

== Bibliography ==
- Hilton, Boyd. A Mad, Bad, and Dangerous People? England 1783-1846. Oxford University Press, 2008.
- Walker, Richard John Boileau. Regency Portraits, Volume 1. National Portrait Gallery, 1985.
