= Croft baronets of Croft Castle (1671) =

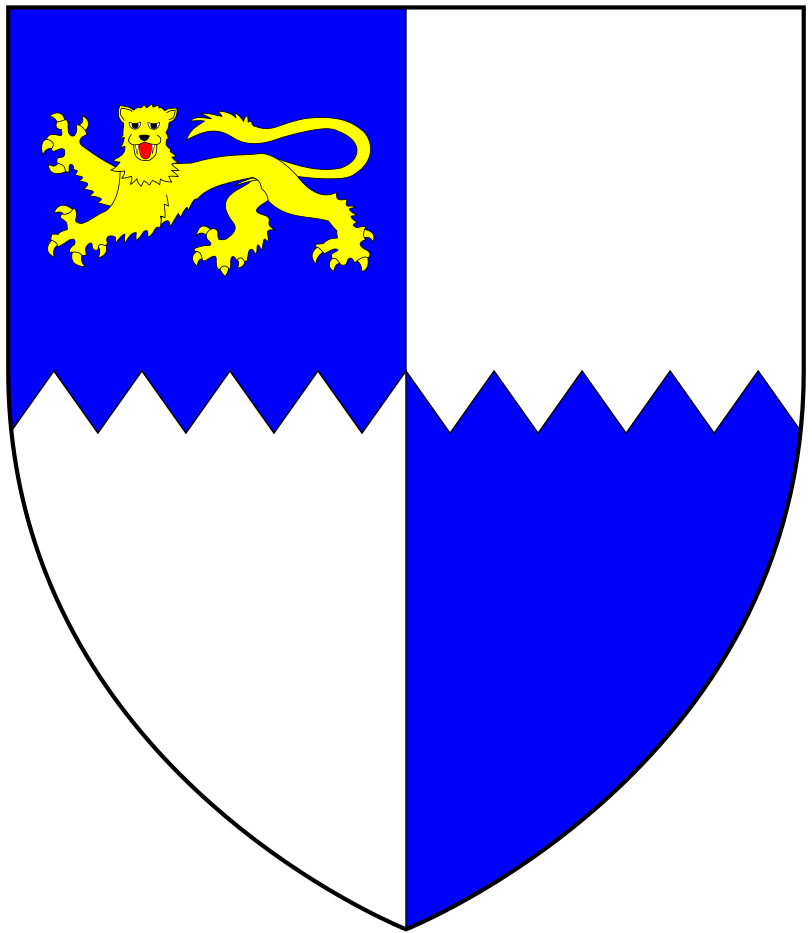
Arms of Croft, of Croft Castle, Herefordshire: Quarterly per fess indented azure and argent, in the 1st quarter a lion passant guardant or

The Croft baronetcy, of Croft Castle in the County of Hereford, was created in the Baronetage of England on 18 November 1671 for Herbert Croft, who later represented Herefordshire in Parliament. He was a member of a prominent Herefordshire family of Norman descent.

The 2nd Baronet sat as Member of Parliament for Leominster, and Bere Alston. The 5th Baronet was an author. The 9th Baronet represented Herefordshire in the House of Commons, from 1868 to 1874.

== Croft baronets, of Croft Castle (1671) ==
- Sir Herbert Croft, 1st Baronet (c. 1652–1720)
- Sir Archer Croft, 2nd Baronet (1684–1753)
- Sir Archer Croft, 3rd Baronet (1731–1792)
- Sir John Croft, 4th Baronet (c. 1735–1797)
- Sir Herbert Croft, 5th Baronet (1751–1816)
- Dr. Sir Richard Croft, 6th Baronet (1762–1818)
- Sir Thomas Elmsley Croft, 7th Baronet (1798–1835)
- Sir Archer Denman Croft, 8th Baronet (1801–1865)
- Sir Herbert George Denman Croft, 9th Baronet (1838–1902)
- Sir Herbert Archer Croft, 10th Baronet (1868–1915)
- Sir James Herbert Croft, 11th Baronet (1907–1941)
- Sir Hugh Matthew Fiennes Croft, 12th Baronet (1874–1954)
- Sir Bernard Hugh Denman Croft, 13th Baronet (1903–1984)
- Sir Owen Glendower Croft, 14th Baronet (born 1932)

The heir apparent to the baronetcy is Thomas Jasper Croft (born 1962), only son of the 14th Baronet.
