= List of works by W. E. Johns =

W. E. Johns bibliography
- Books↙: 8
- Broadcast works↙: 2
- As editor↙: 3
- Publications in periodicals↙: 57
- Fictional books↙: 155

William Earl Johns (professionally known as W. E. Johns; 1893–1968) was an English writer and journalist. He wrote over 150 books and was, after Enid Blyton, "the most prolific and popular children's writer of his time". Most of Johns's work—102 books—consists of the stories of Biggles, a First World War pilot and, later, adventurer, detective and Second World War squadron leader. He also wrote science fiction stories, and two further series of war stories, featuring the characters Worrals of the Women's Auxiliary Air Force (WAAF) and Gimlet, a British Commando.

Johns served in the army during the First World War. (Note: Johns was with the Norfolk Yeomanry at the start of the war, serving in the Gallipoli Campaign, before he transferred to the Machine Gun Corps for service in Salonika.) In 1917 he was commissioned into the Royal Flying Corps (RFC) and saw action in Northern France. In September 1918 his aircraft was shot down and Johns, wounded, was captured by the Germans; he remained a prisoner until the end of the war, despite two attempts to escape. He remained with the RFC through its change into the Royal Air Force (RAF), and served with them until 1927. (Note: Johns was the recruiting officer who signed T. E. Lawrence into the RAF. Although Johns wanted to reject the application because of the obviously false name given by Lawrence, he was ordered to accept the former soldier.)

On leaving the RAF he became a journalist and illustrator. In 1932 he founded Popular Flying magazine and became its first editor. He used the magazine to publish his Biggles short stories. Johns described Biggles as "typical of the type of British airman I knew during the Great War. His chief characteristics are courage, loyalty and sportsmanship." He continued to publish his stories in periodicals and newspapers throughout his career. Six months after the first Biggles stories were published they were collected in book form in The Camels are Coming. During the Second World War, Johns worked for the Air Ministry; the ministry asked him to create a female character to boost recruitment into the Women's Auxiliary Air Force, which resulted in the publication of the Worrals stories and books. The character was successful and the War Office requested Johns introduce a soldier, which led to the introduction of Gimlet.

Johns also wrote eight non-fiction books, most of which related to flying and pilots, although a book on gardening and two children's books—The Modern Boys Book of Pirates and The Biggles Book of Treasure Hunting—were also published. In 1942 Johns also co-wrote two radio plays, which were broadcast on the BBC.

== As editor ==
Anthologies edited
Title	Year of first publication	First edition publisher (All London)
Wings: A Book of Flying Adventures	1931	J. Hamilton
The Modern Boy's Book of Aircraft	1931	Amalgamated Press
Thrilling Flights	1935	J. Hamilton

== Fiction ==
The fictional books of W. E. Johns
Title	Year of first publication	First edition publisher (London, unless otherwise stated)	Series	Notes
The Camels are Coming	1932	J. Hamilton	Biggles	
Mossyface	1922	Weekly Telegraph Novel	–	As William Earle
The Cruise of the Condor	1933	J. Hamilton	Biggles	
The Spy Flyers	1933	J. Hamilton	–	
Biggles of the Camel Squadron	1934	J. Hamilton	Biggles	
Biggles Flies Again	1934	J. Hamilton	Biggles	
Biggles Learns to Fly	1935	The Boys' Friend Library	Biggles	
The Black Peril	1935	J. Hamilton	Biggles	
Biggles Flies East	1935	Oxford University Press	Biggles	
Biggles Hits the Trail	1935	Oxford University Press	Biggles	
Biggles in France	1935	The Boys' Friend Library	Biggles	
The Raid	1935	J. Hamilton	–	
Biggles & Co	1936	Oxford University Press	Biggles	
Biggles in Africa	1936	Oxford University Press	Biggles	
Sky High	1936	Newnes	Steeley	
Steeley Flies Again	1936	Newnes	Steeley	
Blue Blood Runs Red	1936	Newnes	–	As Jon Early
Biggles – Air Commodore	1937	Oxford University Press	Biggles	
Biggles Flies West	1937	Oxford University Press	Biggles	
Murder by Air	1937	Newnes	Steeley	
Biggles Flies South	1938	Oxford University Press	Biggles	
Biggles Goes to War	1938	Oxford University Press	Biggles	
The Murder at Castle Deeping	1938	J. Hamilton	Steeley	
Desert Night	1938	J. Hamilton	–	
Champion of the Main	1938	Oxford University Press	–	
The Rescue Flight	1939	Oxford University Press	Biggles	
Biggles in Spain	1939	Oxford University Press	Biggles	
Biggles Flies North	1939	Oxford University Press	Biggles	
Wings of Romance: A Steeley Adventure	1939	Newnes	Steeley	
Det Forsvunne Bagboksblad (The Missing Page)	1939	Forlagshuset, Oslo, Norway	Steeley	
Biggles – Secret Agent	1940	Oxford University Press	Biggles	
Biggles in the Baltic	1940	Oxford University Press	Biggles	
Biggles in the South Seas	1940	Oxford University Press	Biggles	
The Unknown Quantity	1940	J. Hamilton	–	
Biggles Defies the Swastika	1941	Oxford University Press	Biggles	
Biggles Sees It Through	1941	Oxford University Press	Biggles	
Spitfire Parade	1941	Oxford University Press	Biggles	
Worrals of the W.A.A.F.	1941	Lutterworth Press, Lutterworth, Leics	Worrals	
Biggles in the Jungle	1942	Oxford University Press	Biggles	
Biggles Sweeps the Desert	1942	Hodder & Stoughton	Biggles	
Worrals Flies Again	1942	Hodder & Stoughton	Worrals	
Worrals Carries On	1942	Lutterworth Press, Lutterworth, Leics	Worrals	
Sinister Service	1942	Oxford University Press	–	
Biggles – Charter Pilot	1943	Oxford University Press	Biggles	
Biggles in Borneo	1943	Oxford University Press	Biggles	
Biggles Fails to Return	1943	Hodder & Stoughton	Biggles	
Worrals on the War-Path	1943	Hodder & Stoughton	Worrals	
King of the Commandos	1943	Hodder & Stoughton	"Gimlet" King	
Gimlet Goes Again	1944	University of London Press	"Gimlet" King	
Worrals Goes East	1944	Hodder & Stoughton	Worrals	
Biggles in the Orient	1945	Hodder & Stoughton	Biggles	
Worrals of the Islands: A Story of the War in the Pacific	1945	Hodder & Stoughton	Worrals	
Biggles Delivers the Goods	1946	Hodder & Stoughton	Biggles	
Gimlet Comes Home	1946	University of London Press	"Gimlet" King	
Sergeant Bigglesworth CID	1947	Hodder & Stoughton	Biggles	
Gimlet Mops Up	1947	Brockhampton Press, Leicester	"Gimlet" King	
Comrades in Arms	1947	Hodder & Stoughton	"Gimlet" King, Biggles, Worrals	
Worrals in the Wilds	1947	Hodder & Stoughton	Worrals	
Biggles' Second Case	1948	Hodder & Stoughton	Biggles	
Biggles Hunts Big Game	1948	Hodder & Stoughton	Biggles	
Biggles Takes a Holiday	1948	Hodder & Stoughton	Biggles	
Gimlet's Oriental Quest	1948	Brockhampton Press, Leicester	"Gimlet" King	
Worrals Down Under	1948	Lutterworth Press, Lutterworth, Leics	Worrals	
The Rustlers of Rattlesnake Valley	1948	Thomas Nelson	–	
Biggles Breaks the Silence	1949	Hodder & Stoughton	Biggles	
Gimlet Lends a Hand	1949	Brockhampton Press, Leicester	"Gimlet" King	
Worrals Goes Afoot	1949	Lutterworth Press, Lutterworth, Leics	Worrals	
Worrals in the Wastelands	1949	Lutterworth Press, Lutterworth, Leics	Worrals	
Biggles Gets His Men	1950	Hodder & Stoughton	Biggles	
Gimlet Bores In	1950	Brockhampton Press, Leicester	"Gimlet" King	
Worrals Investigates	1950	Lutterworth Press, Lutterworth, Leics	Worrals	
Doctor Vane Answers the Call	1950	Latimer House	–	
Another Job for Biggles	1951	Hodder & Stoughton	Biggles	
Biggles Goes to School	1951	Hodder & Stoughton	Biggles	
Gimlet off the Map	1951	Brockhampton Press, Leicester	"Gimlet" King	
Biggles Works It Out	1952	Hodder & Stoughton	Biggles	
Biggles Takes the Case	1952	Hodder & Stoughton	Biggles	
Biggles Follows On	1952	Hodder & Stoughton	Biggles	
Biggles – Air Detective	1950	Marks & Spencer	Biggles	
Gimlet Gets the Answer	1952	Brockhampton Press, Leicester	"Gimlet" King	
Biggles and the Black Raider	1953	Hodder & Stoughton	Biggles	
Biggles in the Blue	1953	Brockhampton Press, Leicester	Biggles	
Biggles in the Gobi	1953	Hodder & Stoughton	Biggles	
Biggles of the Special Air Police	1953	Thames Publishing Co.	Biggles	
Short Stories	1953	Latimer House	–	
Sky Fever, and Other Stories	1953	Latimer House	–	
Gimlet Takes a Job	1954	Brockhampton Press, Leicester	"Gimlet" King	
Biggles Cuts It Fine	1954	Hodder & Stoughton	Biggles	
Biggles and the Pirate Treasure	1954	Brockhampton Press, Leicester	Biggles	
Biggles Foreign Legionnaire	1954	Hodder & Stoughton	Biggles	
Biggles Pioneer Air Fighter	1954	Thames Publishing Co.	Biggles	
Kings of Space: A Story of Interplanetary Exploration	1954	Hodder & Stoughton	Rex Clinton	
Biggles in Australia	1955	Hodder & Stoughton	Biggles	
Biggles' Chinese Puzzle	1955	Brockhampton Press, Leicester	Biggles	
Return to Mars	1955	Hodder & Stoughton	Rex Clinton	
Adventure Bound	1955	Thomas Nelson	–	
Biggles of 266	1956	Thames Publishing Co.	Biggles	
No Rest for Biggles	1956	Hodder & Stoughton	Biggles	
Now to the Stars	1956	Hodder & Stoughton	Rex Clinton	
Biggles Takes Charge	1956	Brockhampton Press, Leicester	Biggles	
Biggles Makes Ends Meet	1957	Hodder & Stoughton	Biggles	
Biggles of the Interpol	1957	Brockhampton Press, Leicester	Biggles	
Biggles on the Home Front	1957	Hodder & Stoughton	Biggles	
To Outer Space	1957	Hodder & Stoughton	Rex Clinton	
Adventure Unlimited	1957	Thomas Nelson	–	
Biggles Presses On	1958	Brockhampton Press, Leicester	Biggles	
Biggles on Mystery Island	1958	Hodder & Stoughton	Biggles	
Biggles Buries a Hatchet	1958	Brockhampton Press, Leicester	Biggles	
The Edge of Beyond	1958	Hodder & Stoughton	Rex Clinton	
No Motive for Murder	1958	Hodder & Stoughton	–	
Biggles in Mexico	1959	Brockhampton Press, Leicester	Biggles	
Biggles' Combined Operation	1959	Hodder & Stoughton	Biggles	
Biggles at the World's End	1959	Brockhampton Press, Leicester	Biggles	
The Death Rays of Ardilla	1959	Hodder & Stoughton	Rex Clinton	
The Man Who Lost His Way	1959	Hodder & Stoughton	–	
Biggles and the Leopards of Zinn	1960	Brockhampton Press, Leicester	Biggles	
Biggles Goes Home	1960	Hodder & Stoughton	Biggles	
Biggles and the Poor Rich Boy	1960	Brockhampton Press, Leicester	Biggles	
To Worlds Unknown: A Story of Interplanetary Exploration	1960	Hodder & Stoughton	Rex Clinton	
Adventures of the Junior Detection Club	1960	M. Parish	–	
Where the Golden Eagle Soars	1960	Hodder & Stoughton	–	
Biggles Forms a Syndicate	1961	Hodder & Stoughton	Biggles	
Biggles and the Missing Millionaire	1961	Brockhampton Press, Leicester	Biggles	
The Quest for the Perfect Planet	1961	Hodder & Stoughton	Rex Clinton	
Biggles Goes Alone	1962	Hodder & Stoughton	Biggles	
Orchids for Biggles	1962	Brockhampton Press, Leicester	Biggles	
Biggles Sets a Trap	1962	Hodder & Stoughton	Biggles	
Biggles Takes It Rough	1963	Brockhampton Press, Leicester	Biggles	
Biggles Takes a Hand	1963	Hodder & Stoughton	Biggles	
Biggles' Special Case	1963	Brockhampton Press, Leicester	Biggles	
Biggles and the Plane That Disappeared	1963	Hodder & Stoughton	Biggles	
Biggles Flies to Work	1963	Dean & Son	Biggles	
Worlds of Wonder	1963	Hodder & Stoughton	Rex Clinton	
The Man Who Vanished into Space	1963	Hodder & Stoughton	Rex Clinton	
Biggles and the Lost Sovereigns	1964	Brockhampton Press, Leicester	Biggles	
Biggles and the Black Mask	1964	Hodder & Stoughton	Biggles	
Biggles Investigates	1964	Brockhampton Press, Leicester	Biggles	
Biggles Looks Back	1965	Hodder & Stoughton	Biggles	
Biggles and the Plot That Failed	1965	Brockhampton Press, Leicester	Biggles	
Biggles and the Blue Moon	1965	Brockhampton Press, Leicester	Biggles	
Biggles Scores a Bull	1965	Hodder & Stoughton	Biggles	
Biggles in the Terai	1966	Brockhampton Press, Leicester	Biggles	
Biggles and the Gun Runners	1966	Brockhampton Press, Leicester	Biggles	
Biggles Sorts It Out	1967	Brockhampton Press, Leicester	Biggles	
Biggles and the Dark Intruder	1967	Knight Books, Leicester	Biggles	
Biggles and the Penitent Thief	1967	Brockhampton Press, Leicester	Biggles	
Biggles and the Deep Blue Sea	1967	Brockhampton Press, Leicester	Biggles	
The Boy Biggles	1968	Dean & Son	Biggles	
Biggles in the Underworld	1968	Brockhampton Press, Leicester	Biggles	
Biggles and the Little Green God	1969	Brockhampton Press, Leicester	Biggles	
Biggles and the Noble Lord	1969	Brockhampton Press, Leicester	Biggles	
Biggles Sees Too Much	1970	Brockhampton Press, Leicester	Biggles	
Biggles Does Some Homework	1997	Norman Wright, Watford	Biggles	
Biggles Air Ace: The Uncollected Stories	1999	Norman Wright, Watford	Biggles	

== Publications in periodicals ==
Johns wrote a great number of short stories under his own name and the pseudonym William Earle; no complete list of these works exists. He was also a prolific contributor to articles, columns and news articles. He was the author of "The Passing Show" column for the My Garden magazine between 1937 and 1944 and a columnist for The Modern Boy, Pearson's Magazine, The Boy's Own Paper, The Girl's Own Paper and the ATC Gazette.

Title	Date of publication	Periodical	Notes
"The White Fokker"	April 1932	Popular Flying	
"The Packer"	May 1932	Popular Flying	
"J-9982"	June 1932	Popular Flying	
"The Balloonatics"	July 1932	Popular Flying	
"The Blue Devil"	August 1932	Popular Flying	
"The Boob"	September 1932	Popular Flying	
"The Battle of Flowers"	October 1932	Popular Flying	
"A Flying Start"	November 1932	Popular Flying	
"Biggles and the White Fokker"	7 January 1933	The Modern Boy	
Stories from The Camel is Coming	14 January – 15 April 1933	The Modern Boy	
"The Professor"	January 1933	Popular Flying	
"The Joy-Ride"	February 1933	Popular Flying	
"The Bridge Party"	March 1933	Popular Flying	
"The Bottle Party"	April 1933	Popular Flying	
"The Trap"	May 1933	Popular Flying	
"The Gold Rush"	July 1933	Popular Flying	
"The Maid and the Mountains"	August 1933	Popular Flying	
"The Blue Orchid"	September 1933	Popular Flying	
"Fair Cargo"	October 1933	Popular Flying	
Stories from The Camel is Coming	14 – 21 October 1933	The Modern Boy	
"Beauty and the Beast"	November 1933	Popular Flying	
"Bob's Box"	December 1933	Popular Flying	
"Savages and Wings"	January 1934	Popular Flying	
"Coffee for Two"	4 January 1934	The Daily Express	
"The Oriental Touch"	February 1934	Popular Flying	
"Encounter"	17 February 1934	The Daily Express	
"Down in the Forest"	March 1934	Popular Flying	
"Three Weeks"	April 1934	Popular Flying	
"Biggles Learns to Fly"	April 1934	The Modern Boy	
"The Sheikh and the Greek"	May 1934	Popular Flying	
"Biggles' Xmas Box"	22 December 1934	The Modern Boy	
"Biggles' Christmas Tree"	22 December 1934	The Modern Boy	
"Biggles and the Joker"	2 February 1935	The Modern Boy	
"Biggles' Night Out"	31 August 1935	The Modern Boy	
"Winged Justice"	1935	The New Book of the Air	As William Earle
"Biggles on the Spot"	1936	The Modern Boy's Book of Adventure Stories	
"Biggles Takes the Bait"	1937	The Modern Boy's Annual	
"Haunted Treasure"	26 June 1937	The Modern Boy	
"Biggles Goes to War"	February 1938	Boys' Friend Library	
"Biggles on the Treasure Trail"	19 February 1938	The Modern Boy	
"Wings Over Spain"	21 January 1939	The Modern Boy	
"Biggles' Fledgling"	7 June 1939	The Modern Boy	
"Biggles' Second Case"	February – September 1946	The Boy's Own Paper	
"Sausage and Mash"	March 1940	Air Stories	
"Worrals Works it Out"	September 1947	The Girl's Own Paper	
"Worrals Takes a Hand"	1948	Children's Gift Book	
"The Badge"	January 1950	The Strand Magazine	
"Biggles in Arabia"	February – November 1950	Collins Magazine for Boys and Girls	
"Biggles at School"	October – March 1951	The Boy's Own Paper	
"Biggles Works it Out"	April – September 1951	The Boy's Own Paper	
"Biggles Follows On"	April – September 1952	The Boy's Own Paper	
"Biggles Buries a Hatchet"	March – September 1953	The Boy's Own Paper	
"Biggles Works it Out"	October 1953	The Silver Jacket	Published over eight issues
"What is the 'Secret of Biggles?'"	27 March 1960	TVTimes	
"Living up to Biggles"	8 May 1960	TVTimes	
"Biggles – Air Ace Number 1"	March 1963	Look and Learn	
"Biggles and the Lost Sovereigns"	August – September 1963	Look and Learn	

== Non-fiction ==
The non-fiction work of Johns
Title	Year of first publication	First edition publisher	Notes
The Pictorial Flying Course	1932	J. Hamilton	With Harry M. Scholfield
Fighting Planes and Aces	1932	J. Hamilton	
The Air VCs	1935	J. Hamilton	
Some Milestones in Aviation	1935	J. Hamilton	
The Passing Show: A Garden Diary by an Amateur Gardener	1937	My Garden	
The Modern Boys Book of Pirates	1939	Amalgamated Press	
The Biggles Book of Heroes	1959	M. Parish	
The Biggles Book of Treasure Hunting	1962	M. Parish	

== Broadcast works ==
Several of Johns's works have been adapted for radio and television by others; the following is a list of works by Johns only.

Broadcast works of Johns
Title	First performance	Date of first performance	Type of work	Notes	Ref.
The Machine That Disappeared	BBC Radio	19 June 1942	Radio play	With G.R. Rainier	
The Charming Mrs. Nayther	BBC Radio	15 August 1942	Radio play	With G.R. Rainier	

== Notes and references ==
=== Sources ===
- Berresford Ellis, Peter; Schofield, Jennifer (1993). Biggles! The Life Story of Capt W. E. Johns. Goodmanstone, Dorset: Veloce Publishing Plc. ISBN 978-1-874105-26-8.
- Cadogan, Mary (October 1990). "The Worrals Books of Capt W. E. Johns". The Book and Magazine Collector (79). Diamond Publishing Group.
- Doggett, Peter (September 1987). "The 'Biggles' Books of W. E. Johns". The Book and Magazine Collector (42). Diamond Publishing Group.
- Schmidt, Gary D (1995). "Captain W. E. Johns". In Schmidt, Gary D; Hettinga, Donald (eds.). Dictionary of Literary Biography: British Children's Writers, 1914–1960. Detroit: Gale Research. ISBN 978-0-8103-9355-4.
- Williams, Piers; Berresford Ellis, Peter (2008). "Johns, William Earl (1893–1968)". Oxford Dictionary of National Biography (online ed.). Oxford University Press. doi:10.1093/ref:odnb/34199. (Subscription, Wikipedia Library access or UK public library membership required.)
- Wright, Norman (July 2001). "'Biggles' in Magazines and Comics". The Book and Magazine Collector (208). Diamond Publishing Group.
- Wright, Norman (May 2007). "Biggles: The World War I Stories". The Book and Magazine Collector (281). Diamond Publishing Group.
