= List of Biggles books =

This is a list of Biggles books by W. E. Johns. Some of stories were first published in magazines including The Modern Boy books were published later, while some stories were later published in magazines. Some books were published under different names, some stories were published in more books. The number of books is between 84 and 101. Including the short stories there are 274 stories, but 4 books and one story are from the Gimlet series and Biggles is only a minor character.

#	Title	Year	Setting	Note
1	The Camels Are Coming	1932	1917-18	17 stories, first appearance of Algy. 7 stories originally published in Popular Flying.
2	The Cruise of the Condor	1933	Between wars	
3	Biggles of the Camel Squadron	1934	1917-18	13 stories originally published in Popular Flying and The Modern Boy
4	Biggles Flies Again	1934	Between wars	13 stories, 11 of them in Popular Flying.
5	Biggles Learns to Fly	1935	1917	12 stories originally published in The Modern Boy
6	The Black Peril	1935	Between wars	First appearance of Ginger, The Modern Boy
7	Biggles Flies East	1935	WWI	First appearance of von Stalhein
8	Biggles Hits the Trail	1935	Between wars	The Modern Boy
9	Biggles in France	1935	1917-18	12 stories, The Modern Boy
10	Biggles & Co	1936	Between wars	The Modern Boy
11	Biggles in Africa	1936	Between wars	The Modern Boy
12	Biggles – Air Commodore	1937	Between wars	The Modern Boy
13	Biggles Flies West	1937	Between wars	The Modern Boy
14	Biggles Flies South	1938	Between wars	The Modern Boy
15	Biggles Goes to War	1938	Between wars	The Modern Boy
16	The Rescue Flight	1939	WWI	Modern Boy.
17	Biggles in Spain	1939	Spanish Civil War	Modern Boy.
18	Biggles Flies North	1939	Between wars	Modern Boy.
19	Biggles – Secret Agent	1940	Between wars	Modern Boy.
20	Biggles in the Baltic	1940	Start of WWII	The War Thriller
21	Biggles in the South Seas	1940	Between wars	The Gem
22	Biggles Defies the Swastika	1941	1940	Operation Weserübung. Two different magazines.
23	Biggles Sees It Through	1941	1939-40	Winter War
24	Spitfire Parade	1941	WWII	13 stories (rewritten from Biggles in France), first appearance of Bertie, 666 Squadron
25	Biggles in the Jungle	1942	Between wars	
26	Biggles Sweeps the Desert	1942	WWII	666 Squadron
27	Biggles – Charter Pilot	1943	Between wars	16 stories with Dr. Duck, Boy’s Own Paper
28	Biggles in Borneo	1943	WWII	666 Squadron
29	Biggles Fails to Return	1943	WWII	
30	Biggles in the Orient	1945	WWII	666 Squadron
31	Biggles Delivers the Goods	1946	WWII	666 Squadron
32	Sergeant Bigglesworth CID	1947	Post-WWII	First case as air detective
–	Comrades in Arms	1947	WWII	Short stories, one about Biggles, one about Worrals and one about Gimlet and three others. Stories about Biggles and Gimlet were published in magazines too,
33	Biggles' Second Case	1948	Post-WWII	Boy’s Own Paper
34	Biggles Hunts Big Game	1948	Post-WWII	
35	Biggles Takes a Holiday	1948	Post-WWII	
36	Biggles Breaks the Silence (Note: Again in 1970 as Biggles in the Antarctic)	1949	Post-WWII	
37	Biggles Gets His Men	1950	Post-WWII	The Sunday Herald
38	Another Job for Biggles	1951	Post-WWII	Collins Magazine For Boys And Girls
39	Biggles Goes to School	1951	Pre-WWI	Biggles's childhood, 2nd chronological, Boy’s Own Paper
40	Biggles Works It Out	1952	Post-WWII	Boy’s Own Paper
41	Biggles Takes the Case	1952	Post-WWII, one from WWII	9 stories, some of them published in magazines
42	Biggles Follows On	1952	Post-WWII	Boy’s Own Paper
43	Biggles – Air Detective	1952	Post-WWII	7 stories, first issued in 1950
44	Biggles and the Black Raider	1953	Post-WWII	
45	Biggles in the Blue	1953	Post-WWII	The Eagle
46	Biggles in the Gobi	1953	Post-WWII	The Eagle
47	Biggles of the Special Air Police	1953	Post-WWII	13 different stories, 6 not published before
48	Biggles Cuts It Fine	1954	Post-WWII	
49	Biggles and the Pirate Treasure	1954	Post-WWII	11 stories, 7 not published before
50	Biggles Foreign Legionnaire	1954	Post-WWII	Junior Mirror
51	Biggles Pioneer Air Fighter	1954	WWI	13 stories
52	Biggles in Australia	1955	Post-WWII	Junior Mirror
53	Biggles' Chinese Puzzle	1955	Post-WWII	8 stories, 3 not published before
54	Biggles of 266	1956	WWI	8 stories from Biggles in France, one from Biggles Learns to Fly
55	No Rest for Biggles	1956	Post-WWII	Junior Mirror
56	Biggles Takes Charge	1956	Post-WWII	Junior Mirror
57	Biggles Makes Ends Meet	1957	Post-WWII	
58	Biggles of the Interpol	1957	Post-WWII	11 stories, 9 not published before
59	Biggles on the Home Front	1957	Post-WWII	
60	Biggles Presses On	1958	Post-WWII	11 stories, 7 not published before
61	Biggles on Mystery Island	1958	Post-WWII	
62	Biggles Buries a Hatchet	1958	Post-WWII	Boy’s Own Paper
63	Biggles in Mexico	1959	Post-WWII	
64	Biggles' Combined Operation	1959	Post-WWII	
65	Biggles at the World's End	1959	Post-WWII	
66	Biggles and the Leopards of Zinn	1960	Post-WWII	
67	Biggles Goes Home	1960	Post-WWII	TV Express Weekly
68	Biggles and the Poor Rich Boy	1960	Post-WWII	
69	Biggles Forms a Syndicate	1961	Post-WWII	Express Weekly
70	Biggles and the Missing Millionaire	1961	Post-WWII	
71	Biggles Goes Alone	1962	Post-WWII	
72	Orchids for Biggles	1962	Post-WWII	
73	Biggles Sets a Trap	1962	Post-WWII	
74	Biggles Takes It Rough	1963	Post-WWII	
75	Biggles Takes a Hand	1963	Post-WWII	
76	Biggles' Special Case	1963	Post-WWII	
77	Biggles and the Plane That Disappeared	1963	Post-WWII	
78	Biggles Flies to Work	1963	Post-WWII	11 stories, 4 not published before; one of them originally in Girls Own Paper with Worrals, rewritten about Biggles.
79	Biggles and the Lost Sovereigns (Note: in Knight Books Edition as Biggles and the Lost Treasure (1978))	1964	Post-WWII	Look and Learn
80	Biggles and the Black Mask	1964	Post-WWII	
81	Biggles Investigates	1964	Post-WWII	8 stories
82	Biggles Looks Back	1965	Post-WWII	
83	Biggles and the Plot That Failed	1965	Post-WWII	
84	Biggles and the Blue Moon	1965	Post-WWII	
85	Biggles Scores a Bull	1965	Post-WWII	
86	Biggles in the Terai	1966	Post-WWII	
87	Biggles and the Gun Runners	1966	Post-WWII	
88	Biggles Sorts It Out	1967	Post-WWII	
89	Biggles and the Dark Intruder	1967	Post-WWII	
90	Biggles and the Penitent Thief	1967	Post-WWII	
91	Biggles and the Deep Blue Sea	1967	Post-WWII	
92	The Boy Biggles	1968	Pre-WWI	Biggles's childhood in India
93	Biggles in the Underworld	1968	Post-WWII	
94	Biggles and the Little Green God	1969	Post-WWII	
95	Biggles and the Noble Lord	1969	Post-WWII	
96	Biggles Sees Too Much	1970	Post-WWII	
97	Biggles Does Some Homework	1997	Post-WWII	Author died during work on this book. Finishes mid-sentence. Unfinished story was published in limited edition (300 issues).
98	Biggles Air Ace: The Uncollected Stories	1999		10 stories from 1934 to 1963, 8 of them from WWI, The Modern Boy .

== Omnibus collections ==
- The Biggles Omnibus (OUP, 1938): Biggles Flies East, Biggles Hits the Trail, Biggles and Co
- Biggles Flying Omnibus (OUP, 1940): Biggles Flies North, Biggles Flies South, Biggles Flies West
- The Third Biggles Omnibus (OUP, 1941): Biggles in Spain, Biggles Goes to War, Biggles in the Baltic
- The First Biggles Omnibus (Hodder & Stoughton, 1953): Biggles Sweeps the Desert, Biggles in the Orient, Biggles Delivers the Goods
- The Biggles Air Detective Omnibus (Hodder & Stoughton, 1956): Sergeant Bigglesworth CID, Biggles’ Second Case, Another Job for Biggles, Biggles Works it Out
- The Biggles Adventure Omnibus (Hodder & Stoughton, 1965): Biggles Gets His Men, No Rest for Biggles, Another Job for Biggles, Biggles Takes a Holiday
- The Bumper Biggles Book (Chancellor Press, 1983): Biggles, Pioneer Air Fighter, Biggles Flies South, Biggles in the Orient, Biggles Defies the Swastika, Biggles in the Jungle
- The Best of Biggles (Chancellor Press, 1985): Biggles in Africa, Bigger Flies North, Biggles in the South Seas, Biggles and the Black Mask, Biggles and the Dark Intruder
- The Biggles Story Collection (Red Fox, 1999): Biggles in France, Biggles Defends the Desert, Biggles Foreign Legionnaire
- The Biggles Story Collection II (Red Fox, 2001): Biggles Flies East, Biggles Flies West
- Biggles' Big Adventures (Prion, 2007): Biggles in the Baltic, Biggles Sees it Through, Biggles Flies North, Biggles in the Jungle
- Biggles’ Dangerous Missions (Prion, 2008): Biggles in Australia, Biggles: Secret Agent, Biggles: Flying Detective, Biggles and the Secret Mission
- Biggles' Secret Assignments (Prion, 2009): Biggles Second Case, Biggles Breaks the Silence, Biggles Gets His Men, Biggles Follows On
- The Biggles WW2 Collection (Doubleday, 2012): Biggles Defies the Swastica, Biggles Delivers the Goods, Biggles Defends the Desert, Biggles Fails to Return
- Biggles Adventure Double (Doubleday, 2013): Biggles Learns to Fly, The Camels are Coming

== Notes ==
Biggles appears in 4 Gimlet books too.

Biggles Air Commodore has also been published as Biggles and the Secret Mission
