= Alice Maude Angell =

English painter and illustrator

Maude Angell
- Born: Alice Maude Angell; 18 July 1870; Hornsey, London
- Died: 16 September 1944 (aged 74); Southgate, London
- Known for: Painting

Alice Maude Angell (18 July 1870 – 16 September 1944) was an English illustrator and painter, primarily of flowers. She exhibited her works at the Royal Academy of Arts 18 times between 1889 and 1916, but was also showcased at the Royal Birmingham Society of Artists, Royal Institute of Painters in Water Colours, Fine Art Society, Royal Society of British Artists, New Gallery, Royal Watercolour Society, Chelsea Flower Show, and the Royal Society of Miniature Painters, Sculptors and Gravers. Angell frequently wrote and illustrated for The Girls Own Paper and Woman's Magazine under editor Flora Klickmann, designing several of the publication's covers and frontispieces.

== Early life ==
Book illustrated by Angell using the 'Maud' spelling, 1905

Alice Maude Angell, sometimes spelt Maud, was born in Hornsey in North London on 18 July 1870, the second daughter of George Angell (1819 – 1884) and Jane Hudden Angell, née Courthope (1843 – 1927). She was baptised at St Mary at Finchley on 18 December 1875. Angell's father was a silversmith who had acquired the family business, Joseph Angell and Son, which he subsequently continued under the name George Angell & Co. Her mother, Jane, worked as a boarding-house keeper.

When Angell was four years old, her elder sister, Elizabeth Wellesley, married the artist and professor Charles Philip Slocombe. Slocombe came from a family of artists and specialised in watercolour painting and etching, particularly of landscapes and sporting subjects. He worked formally as a Master on the staff of the National Art Training Schools, today the Royal College of Art.

As a young child, Angell was fascinated by wild flowers, often slipping through a hole in the hedge of her country home to explore a neighbouring meadow. Her first attempt at watercolour painting came after she had been scolded and confined to a room adjoining her father's study. There, she discovered the 'forbidden fruit': a box of paints, and began a series of 'hasty "impressions"' on note paper and letters. She later recalled this episode as one of the happiest hours of 'stolen joy' in her life.

At the age of 20, Angell visited her sister and recently retired brother-in-law at their home in Hendon. Charles's younger brother, Frederick Albert Slocombe, also resided with the family. Like his brother, Frederick was a watercolourist and printmaker, specialising in landscape subjects. He was elected a member of the Royal Society of Painter-Etchers and Engravers in 1881. Much of Angell's formal training may have been gleaned from the Slocombe brothers. Notably her instructional book, Flower Pictures (1914), is dedicated to 'F.S.', whose 'kindly help and interest she owes so much.'

== Career ==
Later study of azaleas, 1921

Angell first exhibited at the Royal Academy in 1889, with her watercolour Azaleas. From the 1890s, she undertook commissions from the publisher Ernest Nister, producing designs and illustrations for children's books. These included a design for Cinderella and illustrations for the book of verse Playtime Stories.

By December 1904, Angell was described by the Islington Gazette as a 'well-known Christmas card designer.' She produced watercolours for several picture postcard publishers, including Misch & Stock, Photochrom Co., and William McKenzie & Co. For Christmas 1910, she illustrated Violets to Greet You, a perfumed calendar of Irish songs by Thomas Moore, featuring her botanical studies of violets. The New York Times praised the calendar as 'as dear and dainty a holiday reminder of his existence as any lover could wish to send to the lady of his heart.'

Covers for The Girls Own Annual and The Woman's Magazine illustrated by Angell

The following year, Angell began contributing illustrations to The Girl's Own Paper. Her first cover, featuring a selection of fruit and flowers, appeared in the November 1911 issue. Under the editorship of Flora Klickmann, Angell's contributions expanded beyond illustration to include written articles. In 1914, she published her book Flower Pictures, a collection of articles originally written for Girl's Own on flower portrait painting, accompanied by illustrations, poems, and prose.

Angell continued to illustrate Girl's Own and contribute to books published by Klickmann until 1930, shortly before Klickmann's retirement in 1931.

== Artistic practice and technique ==
Angell wrote several articles advising beginner artists and discussing her methods for producing botanical studies. She maintained that formal artistic training was not essential, arguing instead that Nature was 'the greatest Art teacher of all time.'

Her recommended artistic inventory included cold-pressed paper mounted on millboard, soft pencils, a rubber or piece of bread to soften pencilling, fine sable-hair and hog's-hair brushes, a glass pickle jar for water, pan watercolours, a china palette, white blotting paper, and a small sponge. For painting en plein air, she recommended taking an easel, camp stool and umbrella, if the artist could manage the burden. She also suggested carrying a cardboard box lined with damp cotton wool to keep specimens fresh for further study at home.

Pencil sketch of apple blossom, 1914

For indoor still-life painting, Angell made backgrounds from brown paper and drapery, or from pieces of fabric drawn from her prized collection of 'rags,' which included old furniture coverings, dress fragments, and curtains. Her palette comprised pigments including Rose Madder, Orange Vermilion, Light Red, Cadmium, Burnt Sienna, Brown Pink, Raw Sienna, Raw Umber, Vandyke Brown, Indian Yellow, Lemon Yellow, Aureolin, Yellow Ochre, Cobalt Blue, Antwerp Blue, Emerald Green, and Mauve. She advised against using Chinese white, observing that in nature there was 'very little hard black or crude white.'

Angell's approach to flower portraiture, as she described it, prioritised capturing an initial impression of a subject rather than reproducing it exactly as it appeared. She advised students to look at their subjects occasionally with half-closed eyes to better judge tonal values, and recommended working in the shade when painting outdoors. She also emphasised the importance of preparatory studies, frequently producing smaller sketches in charcoal and pencil before attempting larger compositions. As she advised: 'Do not despise the day of small things; make fragmentary studies in plenty before you attempt a large picture.'

Roses were Angell's favourite flowers, although she considered them among the most difficult to reproduce successfully. As a left-handed artist, she also paid particular attention to the positioning of her light source to avoid casting unwanted shadows while working.

== Death ==
Angell died having never married on 16 September 1944, aged 74, at 118 Palmerston Road, Southgate. Her estate was valued at £3,060.

== Gallery ==
Vase of Roses, 1914

Bullfinches and Blossom, undated

Poppies, undated

Larkspurs Loved of the Bees, 1925

Roses in a Blue Vase, 1895

Wild Roses, 1914

Madonna Lilies, c. 1920

Tulips, c. 1920

'An Old Stone Vase,' 1914

An Old-World Garden, undated

== Bibliography ==
- Friendship by Ralph Waldo Emerson, illustrated by Arthur A. Dixon and Maude Angell (Ernest Nister, 1894)
- "Should Auld Acquaintance Be Forgot": A Birthday Book, illustrated by Maud Angell (Hills & Company Limited, London, 1905)
- Oranges and Lemons, illustrated by Maude Angell (Ernest Nister, 1905)
- Playtime Stories, colour plate at frontis by Maude Angell (Ernest Nister, 1908)
- The Life-History of the Brimstone Butterfly by Henry Irving, and How I Paint Roses, by Maude Angell (Warwick Bros. & Rutter Limited, Toronto, 1913)
  Books illustrated by Maude Angell
- Flower Pictures by Maude Angell, edited by Flora Klickmann (Frederick A. Stokes, 1914)
- The Little Girl’s Bird Book, edited by Flora Klickmann and illustrated by Maude Angell (Religious Tract Society, London, 1917)
- Fruit and Flower Studies: A Book for Amateur Artists, edited by Flora Klickmann and illustrated by Maude Angell (Frederick A. Stokes, New York, 1920)
- The Scent of the Wallflowers: A Little Book of Helpful Verse, edited by Flora Klickmann, cover illustrated by Maude Angell (Religious Tract Society, 1924)
