= Biggles (film) =

1986 film directed by John Hough

- Original British 1986 quad film poster
- Directed by: John Hough
- Screenplay by: John Groves; Kent Walwin
- Based on: the Biggles books by W. E. Johns
- Produced by: Pom Oliver; Kent Walwin
- Starring: Neil Dickson; Alex Hyde-White; Fiona Hutchison; Peter Cushing; Marcus Gilbert; William Hootkins
- Cinematography: Ernest Vincze
- Edited by: Richard Trevor
- Music by: Stanislas Syrewicz
- Production companies: Compact Yellowbill; Tambarle
- Distributed by: United International Pictures (UK)
- Release dates: 23 May 1986 (UK/date); 29 January 1988 (USA)
- Running time: 92 min.
- Country: United Kingdom
- Language: English
- Budget: £7 million
- Box office: £1.45 million (UK), $112,132 (USA)

Biggles (U.S. 1988 release title Biggles: Adventures in Time) is a 1986 British science fiction adventure film directed by John Hough and starring Neil Dickson, Alex Hyde-White, and Peter Cushing (in his final feature film role). It was written by John Groves and Kent Walwin. The plot involves time travel between the 1980s and the First World War, involving the character Biggles (from the series of novels by W. E. Johns).

== Plot ==
In the mid-1980s, catering salesman Jim Ferguson, living in present-day New York City, is involuntarily transported to the Western Front in 1917, where he saves the life of dashing Royal Flying Corps pilot James "Biggles" Bigglesworth after he is shot down on a photo reconnaissance mission. Before he can work out what has happened, Jim is zapped back to 1986.

He is visited by Biggles' former commanding officer, William Raymond, who is now an Air Commodore living in Tower Bridge in London. Raymond tells him about his theory that Ferguson and Biggles are "time twins", spontaneously transported through time when the other is in mortal danger. Together, Ferguson and Biggles fight across time and against the odds to stop the Germans by destroying a revolutionary "sound weapon" with a Metropolitan Police helicopter that was stolen by Biggles while they were escaping a SWAT team in 1986 London.

== Cast ==
- Neil Dickson as Lieutenant James 'Biggles' Bigglesworth
- Alex Hyde-White as Jim Ferguson
- Fiona Hutchison as Debbie
- Peter Cushing as Air Commodore William Raymond
- Marcus Gilbert as Hauptmann Erich von Stalhein
- William Hootkins as Chuck
- Alan Polonsky as Bill
- Francesca Gonshaw as Marie
- Michael Siberry as Second Lieutenant The Honourable Algernon 'Algy' Montgomery Lacey
- James Saxon as Second Lieutenant Lord Bertie Lissie
- Daniel Flynn as Ginger Hebblethwaite

== Production ==
=== Development ===
After the success of the war film The Blue Max (1966), a film based on W. E. Johns' books was planned in 1968. Financed by Universal Pictures, a script entitled Biggles Sweeps The Skies was written by Chris Bryant and to be filmed in Algeria. Pre-production work was completed, including building replica period aircraft. James Fox was tapped to play Biggles and even appeared in promotional material, until the film was cancelled, due to budgetary and location problems.

In February 1976, Peter James bought the rights to the Biggles stories, but the film remained in development hell for several years.

In December 1979, Dudley Moore, who had just become a star with 10, said he agreed to play Biggles and make the film in Europe after he finished Arthur (1981).

In October 1980, Disney announced they would make Biggles as a co-production with producer Robert Stigwood.

In April 1981, a newspaper report said that the film would be produced by Kent Walwin of Yellowbill Productions, with a script from Jack Briley. Moore would star as Biggles and they hoped for Oliver Reed to play von Stalhein.

Walwin had plans to make a series of Biggles adventures, stating:

We were looking for something with the quality of Bond, not just aesthetically in terms of what we could create, but financially. The subject lends itself to a mini-series – and there is almost certainly that somewhere down the line. And we could do another feature. What we are saying is that 'Biggles' is our Bond.

In February 1982, it was announced that Biggles would be played by Jeremy Irons, coming off the 1981 television serial Brideshead Revisited.

John Hough signed to direct in November 1984. He had read the Biggles books as a child, was attracted by the unconventional story, and was available after a deal to direct a James Bond film fell through.

Neil Dickson was cast as Biggles after the producers and Hough saw his performance in the 1985 miniseries A.D. Like Hough, Dickson was a fan of the novels and was thrilled at getting the chance to play the character. Alex Hyde-White landed the role of Jim Ferguson based on his work in the 1984 miniseries The First Olympics: Athens 1896. The two leads became friends during filming.

=== Writing ===
Early versions of the script were written by Michael Fallon and called for an adventure film in the mould of Raiders of the Lost Ark. The original story would have been much more faithful to Johns' original novels. Some sources claim that during scriptwriting, however, Back to the Future was released and became a major hit, so the script was duly altered by Walwin and John Groves to follow this time travel trend, to capitalise on Back to the Future's popularity. However, Biggles had already completed filming by the date of Back to the Future's UK release date of December 1985.

The film takes considerable liberty with the storyline of the original novels. In addition to the introduction of a science-fiction plot, Biggles is much older than in the books (where he is only a teenager in 1917), and the characters Ginger and Bertie feature, although they don't join Biggles until much later in the book series. However, the presence of Biggles' friend Algy, adversary Erich von Stalhein and love interest Marie fits with the earlier books in the series, as does the presence of Commodore Raymond, who employed Biggles for covert operations in the later stories.

== Filming ==
The Eady Levy was due to expire at the end of March 1985, and the film was partially funded by this. As a result, filming had to be completed before the expiration date. With such a tight deadline, filming began in London on 21 January 1985, before the script had been finalised. Principal photography took place over six weeks between January and March 1985. The film was both Dickson's and Hyde-White's first leading roles in a motion picture. It was also Fiona Hutchison's first film role. She described her character, Debbie, as 'trapped and terrified.' To play Biggles' rival, von Stalhein, Marcus Gilbert researched German First World War fighter aces, especially Manfred von Richthofen. At one point, he can be seen wearing a Blue Max medallion.

Veteran stuntman Gerry Crampton coordinated the action sequences and designed the stunts for the film, while second unit director Terry Coles, who had done similar work on Battle of Britain was in charge of filming the aerial sequences.

The film includes a scene where Biggles lands a helicopter (a Bell 206 JetRanger G-BAKF) on a flat wagon on a moving train. This was filmed on the Nene Valley Railway and was apparently the first time such a stunt had been attempted. Fifteen takes were needed before the director was satisfied that the sequence was finished. The helicopter was flown by stunt pilot Marc Wolff. The JetRanger was destroyed in a crash in 1989.

The Sopwith Pup that crashes near the start of the film was specially built by Skysport Engineering. The crash was unplanned and the scene was rewritten to work around this.

=== Locations ===
The film was mostly shot in London and on various locations in the home counties. The opening scenes of Jim's New York apartment was filmed at The Avenue, Cutler's Gardens. Tower Bridge and the surrounding area was extensively used, including the Tower Hotel, which doubled as the film crew's base of operations. The hotel also featured during The Wild Geese, Brannigan and the first Sweeney! spinoff film. Some of the aerial sequences were shot near Millbrook Proving Ground in Bedfordshire. The 1917 weapon testing ground scene was shot at the Beckton Gas Works, which, a year later, was used for scenes in Full Metal Jacket and had been the location for the pre-title sequence in the 1981 Bond film, For Your Eyes Only, in which, coincidentally, Marc Wolff had also performed similar helicopter stunts, and it was seen during the finale of Brannigan. The weapon itself was a custom-made fibreglass dish mounted on a mobile crane. It was filmed at the former London Brick Company works near Brogborough in Bedfordshire, as were the trench scenes. The site is now a landfill and recycling centre owned by FCC Environment. The sound weapon appears to be based on a real-life sonic device that the Nazis were working on during the Second World War. It used a reflector to transmit high-energy sound waves. The exterior church scenes were all filmed at All Saints Church, Holdenby, and the courtyard scenes were filmed by the stable blocks of Holdenby House.

=== Aircraft ===
Several aircraft were used in the film. These included a Stampe SV.4 G-BXNW, which is flown by Biggles, and a Boeing Stearman G-AROY, which is flown by his arch-rival, von Stalhein. Both these biplanes are actually from the 1930s, as flying and maintaining actual First World War aircraft was considered prohibitively expensive. The period aircraft seen in the background during ground scenes belonged to the Shuttleworth Collection. The Stampe was flown by Stuart Goldspink, while the Stearman was piloted by former Second World War bomber pilot John Jordan. The Stampe was a popular choice for filming, having featured heavily in Aces High and was later seen in Indiana Jones and the Last Crusade. Both aircraft still exist as of 2021.

== Release ==
Biggles received a royal charity premiere on 22 May 1986 at the Plaza Cinema on Lower Regent Street in London. The film went on general release in the UK on 23 May 1986. To promote the release of the film, the story was published in newspapers in comic strip form and promoted via ABC Cinemas with discounted tickets available. A novelisation by Trevor Hoyle writing as Larry Milne was published, as was a picture book by Peter James to tie in to the release.

== Reception ==
In Screen International Marjorie Bilbow wrote: "A likeable movie that nearly succeeds in its object of mixing a youth-orientated Now with the Then of a folk hero. If anyone could convince me that the gallant Biggles of Captain W E Johns might have needed the help of a purveyor of posh takeaways it would be the incomparable Peter Cushing who brings a touch of genuine class to the goings-on as a sort of uppercrust Merlin explaining the plot and introducing the frightfully decent chaps of 1917 to the more raucous but equally decent young New Yorkers of today. But the time that has to be devoted to the scenes of Jim's everyday existence in the US slows the pace of an otherwise lively adventure without being compensatingly funny."

Variety wrote: "Thesping among the supporting cast, especially Biggles’ mates (Michael Siberry, Daniel Flynn and James Saxon) is uniformly lively, but Neil Dickson as Biggles steals the film. A huskier, younger version of Peter O’Toole, he evokes a Biggles who's survived on wits and more than a little luck. Technically, pic is topnotch, especially aerial sequences using vintage bi-planes." was more positive, praising the action scenes and Dickson's performance especially.

Sheila Benson of the Los Angeles Times wrote: "John Hough has done a dozen or more films ... but it is his memorable television success, The Avengers, that should be closest in wit and irony to Biggles. The fact that it’s not is only one of the disappointments of the film, which is depth-charged with disappointment. Certainly Hough has assembled good actors, including the elegant Peter Cushing ... and a pair of extraordinarily handsome and adept young leading men, Hyde-White and Neil Dickson, who plays Biggles. But with a cheesy plot, the world’s worst and most intrusive music and time travel giving everyone whiplash, there’s no time to savor the present or the past, or the incongruities of one seen by the other."

Colin Greenland reviewed Biggles for White Dwarf #77, and stated that Biggles was "in a silly story about the Germans developing a sonic weapon in 1917 and threatening history as we know it. Too little aerobatics, too much running around in anachronistic locations; lots of laughs, though mainly of disbelief."

The film was not a success at the box office. John Hough observed that the film got into profit later through television repeats and video sales. In the intervening years, Biggles has become a cult film.

== Soundtrack ==
The soundtrack was composed by Stanislas Syrewicz and released by MCA Records on vinyl and cassette tape.

Jon Anderson of Yes wrote the lyrics for the film's signature song, "Do You Want to Be a Hero?" as well as "Chocks Away", while Syrewicz composed the rhythm. Anderson and Syrewicz were both signed to Island Records at the time and had agreed to collaborate on the music. Just like the film, the soundtrack drew mixed reviews because of its experimental themes which seemed out of place in a period adventure and heavy use of synthesizers.

=== Track listing ===
- Jon Anderson – "Do You Want to Be a Hero?"
- Jon Anderson – "Chocks Away"
- Deep Purple – "Knocking at Your Back Door"
- Mötley Crüe – "Knock 'Em Dead, Kid"
- Queen – "Another One Bites The Dust"
- The Immortals – "No Turning Back" co-written by John Deacon in his second non-Queen recording. Deacon was asked by John Hough to compose a song for the film after meeting him shortly after Live Aid. The track was released as a single, and the accompanying music video also starred Peter Cushing in his very last on-screen appearance. The song failed to chart.

== Video game ==
As a tie-in to the film, a video game with the same title was released in 1986 by Image Works for the Amstrad CPC, Commodore 64 and ZX Spectrum. The game was based on the Film's storyline and featured four different missions, including flying combat sequences with biplanes, a rooftop chase, searching for the secret weapon in a trench setting and first-person helicopter gameplay. The game received mixed reviews.
