= Trois crayons =

Artistic technique

Trois crayons (French: [tʁwɑ kʁɛjɔ̃]; French for 'three pencils') is a drawing technique using three colors of chalk: red (sanguine), black (charcoal or black stone), and white. The paper used may be a mid-tone such as grey, blue, or tan. Among numerous others, French painters Antoine Watteau and François Boucher drew studies of figures and drapery aux trois crayons. The technique was, most notably, pioneered and popularised by the Flemish master Peter Paul Rubens.

Aux deux crayons uses only two colors, frequently black and white, as seen in many of Pierre-Paul Prud'hon's drawings.

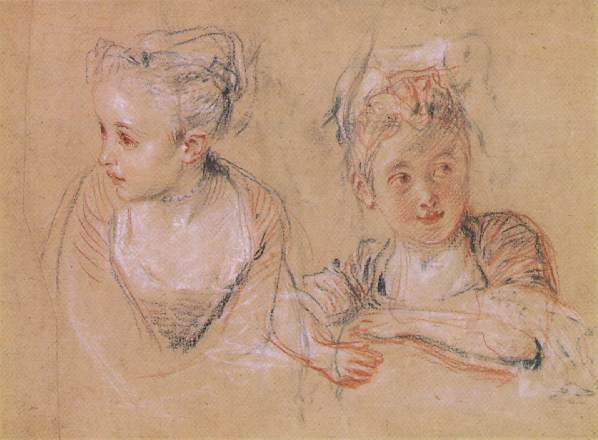
By Watteau

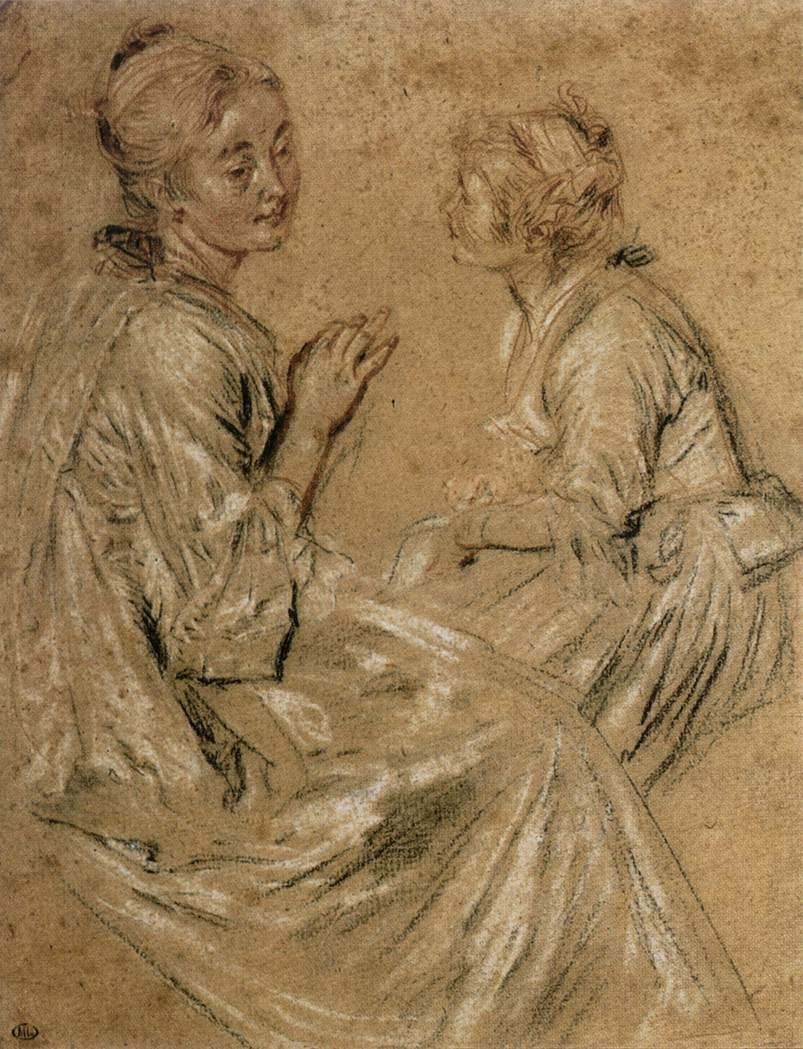
By Watteau, c. 1716

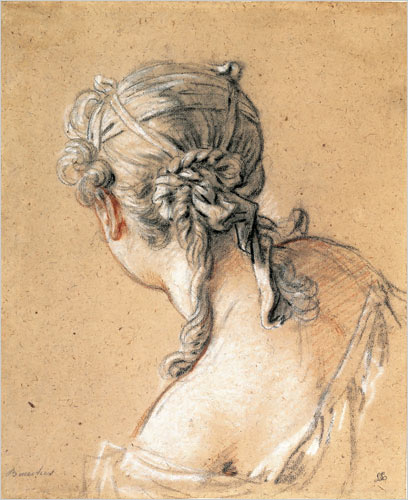
By Boucher, c. 1740

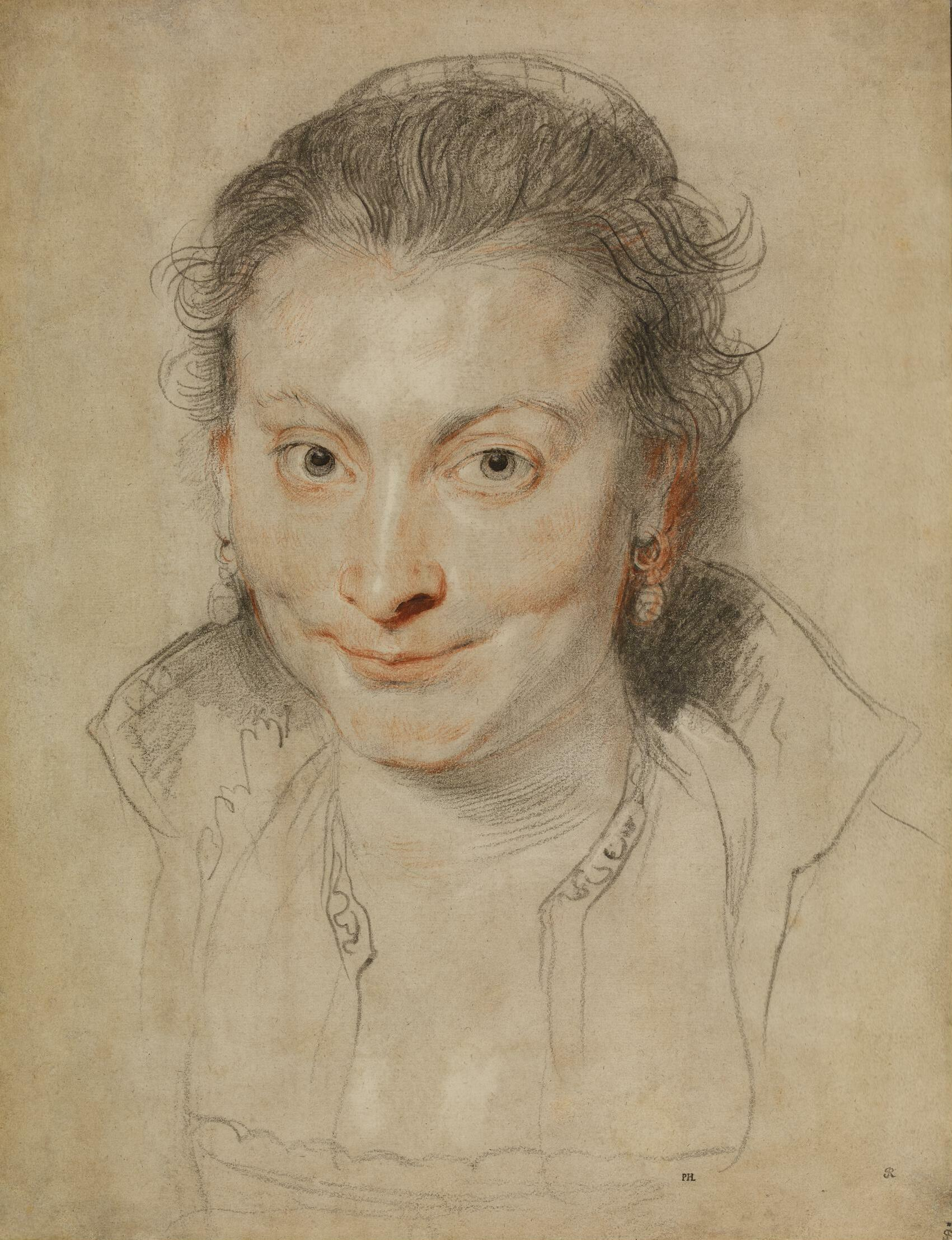
By Rubens, c. 1621

== Origin ==
The trois crayons drawing technique has its roots in the second half of the 15th century in Europe. During this period, artist began drawing with natural red chalk along with limited natural chalks. As drawing techniques evolved, artists combined red chalk with other chalks, including white chalk. The use of white chalk allowed artists to enhance lighting effects in their drawings. However, since white chalk was barely visible on white paper or parchment, artists began to use a toned background to allow the technique to work effectively. During the 16th century artists developed sophisticated drawing techniques, such as in matita rossa e nera ("in red and black chalk pencils") known in Italy and aux deux crayons ("with two chalk pencils") known in France. In the early 17th century, the technique developed further combining red, white, and black chalk to produce the aux trois crayons ("with three chalk pencils") technique, typically executed on blue or tan colored paper. The trois crayons technique was developed most completely in the 18th century.

== Technique and materials ==
The methods of blending and layering the colors in trois crayons technique involves a step-by-step process setting proportion and organization, introducing mass shadows, developing shadows and light, and rendering the lights with varying intensity. By combining red, black, and white chalk artists create vivid and vibrant drawings. The method promotes color harmony with its limited range of colors, making it efficient and creative. Materials used include red, black and white chalks, pigmented pencils, and specific paper. The results demonstrate how the trois crayons technique can create compelling artworks.

== Development and popularity in the Rococo era ==
Antoine Watteau's artistic contributions in the 18th century had a significant impact on the development of Rococo art in France and Europe. His innovative fête galante painting, portraying graceful figures in romantic landscapes, were revolutionary for their time. Additionally, Watteau's exceptional skills as a draftsman was evident in his intricate chalk studies capturing subtle expressions and movements. His mastery of this method inspired admiration and influence on other French artists, such as Jean-Baptiste Joseph Pater, François Boucher, and Jean Honoré Fragonard. Antoine Watteau's delicate palette, influenced by Rubens and Venetian paintings, set the tone for Rococo aesthetics leaving an indelible legacy in the world of art and shaping the Rococo movement in the 18th century.

== Impact on later art movements ==
In the 1950s, the attribution of an album of faun studies raised doubts due to an unfamiliar technique in some drawings. Initially thought to be by Antoine Coypel, further analysis suggested Louis de Boullogne the Younger as the likely artist, revealing stylistic similarities in his use of chalk. These faun studies, likely created for a specific ceiling decoration, enrich Boullogne's body of work, uncovering a previously unknown aspect of his artistry and prompting further exploration in the art world.
