= Lutterworth (disambiguation) =

Lutterworth is a town in Leicestershire, England.

Lutterworth may also refer to:

- Lutterworth, Ontario
- The Lutterworth Press, a British publishing house
