= Brockhampton Press =

British publishing company

Brockhampton Press was a British publishing company, based in Leicester.

== Children's books ==
Originally specialising in children's books, from about 1940, Brockhampton Press published the Asterix comic book series, many of Enid Blyton's story collections (such as The Secret Seven), many of W. E. Johns's Biggles titles, much of the Ian and Sovra series by Elinor Lyon, the Cherry books by Will Scott, and Scottish author Nigel Tranter's children's books.

It also published series of children's books, including the Hampton Library and the Super Hampton Library, and the Blackberry Farm series by Jane Pilgrim.

== Non-fiction series ==
In the 1990s the Brockhampton Press published a number of non-fiction and reference series aimed at the popular market, such as The Brockhampton Library and the Brockhampton Reference series.

== Military history ==
Brockhampton Press is now an imprint of Hodder Headline, and is known for its military history books, including works by historian David Nicolle.
