= Davidson Knowles =

British painter

Davidson Knowles (1854–1901) was a British landscape painter, active in London from 1879. He was a member of the Royal Society of British Artists, and exhibited at its gallery in Suffolk Street and at the Royal Academy. He supplied illustrations to The Illustrated London News, and to The Girl's Own Paper; two of these are in the collections of the Metropolitan Museum of Art.
