= Shafshelar =

Court title in the Sasanian Empire

Shafshelar (lit. "sword-bearer") was the second highest ranked court title in the Sasanian Empire. The shafshelar, unlike most other officials, was dressed in military garb during ceremonies. His task was primarily to carry the king's sword in a gold scabbard.

== Sources ==
- Nicolle, David (1996), Sassanian Armies: the Iranian Empire Early 3rd to Mid-7th Centuries AD, Stockport: Montvert, ISBN 978-1-874101-08-6
- S. Spawforth, A. J. (2007). The Court and Court Society in Ancient Monarchies. Cambridge University Press. ISBN 9781139466639.
