= Kathleen Fidler =

English-Scottish children's writer (1899–1980)

Kathleen Fidler (Kathleen Annie Fidler Goldie) (10 August 1899 – 7 August 1980) was a prolific author of over 80 children's books.

Kathleen Annie Fidler was born on 10 August 1899 in Coalville, Leicestershire. She was raised in Wigan and educated in Wigan Girls' High School and at St. Mary's College in Bangor North Wales. She became a teacher and taught at St. Paul's Girls' School, Wigan, and was the headmistress of the Scot Lane Evening Institute between 1924 and 1930. She married James H. Goldie in 1930 and moved to Edinburgh shortly afterwards, where she began writing stories for her children. She finally settled in Wester Riggs, a large house in Broomieknowe, a secluded road in Lasswade, Midlothian. There her husband became the manager of a local branch of the Bank of Scotland. They had a daughter, Nancy, and a son, Hamish.

During the course of her career, she wrote over 80 novels and non-fiction books for children, many of her novels following the adventures of two families, The Brydons and The Deans. Her work has been praised for the depth and detail of research into the background of her stories. She also wrote scripts for the BBC.

After Kathleen Fidler died on 7 August 1980, her publishers and members of the Edinburgh Children's Book Group established the Kathleen Fidler Award in memory of her work and support for children's literature. The award, which closed in 2002, was awarded to previously unpublished authors for novels for children aged 8 to 12.

To this day children read her books, which continue to be published and made available and are widely taught in Scottish schools.

Her papers are held at the National Library of Scotland.

== Book list ==
All dates in the list below refer to the first date of publication. All books were originally published by The Lutterworth Press

=== The Brydons series ===
- The Borrowed Garden (1944)
- St. Jonathan’s in the Country (1945)
- The Brydons at Smugglers Creek (1945)
- More Adventures of the Brydons (1947)
- The Brydons Go Camping (1948)
- The Brydons Do Battle (1949)
- The Brydons in Summer (1949)
- The Brydons Look For Trouble (1950)
- The Brydons in a Pickle (1950)
- Surprises for the Brydons (1950)
- The Brydons Get Things Going (1951)
- The Brydons Hunt For Treasure (1951)
- The Brydons Catch Queer Fish (1952)
- The Brydons Stick at Nothing (1952)
- The Brydons Abroad (1953)
- The Brydons on the Broads (1955)
- Challenge to the Brydons (1956)
- The Brydons at Blackpool (1960)
- The Brydons Go Canoeing (1963)

=== The Deans series ===
- The Deans Move In (1953)
- The Deans Follow A Clue (1954)
- The Deans Solve A Mystery (1954)
- The Deans Defy Danger (1955)
- The Deans Dive For Treasure (1956)
- The Deans to the Rescue (1957)
- The Deans Lighthouse Adventure (1959)
- The Deans And Mr. Popple (1960)
- The Deans Dutch Adventure (1962)

=== The Mr. Simister series ===
- The Mysterious Mr. Simister (1947)
- Mr. Simister Appears Again (1948)
- Mr. Simister Is Unlucky (1949)

== Others ==
- "The Kathleen Fidler Omnibus" (1946)
- The White Cockade Passes (1947)
- Guest Castle (1949)
- True Tales of Treasure (1962)
- The Desperate Journey (1964)
- The Boy With the Bronze Axe (1968) (set in Skara Brae)
- The Railway Runaways (1977)
- The Lost Cave (1978)
- Pablos and the Bull (1979)
- Seal Story (1979)
