= Blackberry Farm (books) =

Series of children's literature stories written by Jane Pilgrim

Cover of Emily the Goat, the first book in the Blackberry Farm series.

Blackberry Farm is a series of 25 children's literature stories. They were written by Jane Pilgrim, and first published around 1950, with copyright for individual titles dated between 1949 and 1967. The original books were illustrated in colour by F. Stocks May. Published by the Brockhampton Press of Leicester, they originally retailed at One Shilling and Sixpence.

The series described events on a fictional farm, Blackberry Farm, situated on the outskirts of an unnamed English village. The farm, seemingly a sheep and dairy property, is owned by Mr and Mrs Smiles, who have two children, Joy and Bob, but the central characters of the stories are various animals. Most of the animals, although depicted at their normal size, appear to speak English and interact with the human characters.

== Author, Jane Pilgrim ==
Jane Pilgrim, the pen name of Mrs. Hodder-Williams, said she wrote the Blackberry Farm books because she found many children's books "unsuitable for the very young at bedtime." Her identity was confirmed in a Derby Daily Telegraph article dated 6 June 1958, which stated: "Mrs Hodder-Williams, better known as Jane Pilgrim, the well-known writer of children's books, will present prizes at Derby High School for Girls Junior Speech Day on June 11." The Hodder-Williams family were intrinsically linked to Brockhampton Press, as Paul Hodder-Williams, was chairman and joint chief executive of Hodder & Stoughton from 1961 to 1975. Hodder & Stoughton established the Brockhampton Press imprint, which was later absorbed into Caxton Publishing.)

== Cover Designs ==
The UK paperback Little Books were published in a square format, measuring 5½ × 5¼ inches (127mm × 133mm). Each cover featured a central plate depicting a key character or scene from the story set against a background of either red, green, or blue, with the title above, and the author's name and 'Blackberry Farm Books' below. In early impressions, the numbering of the books appeared in the bottom right-hand corner of the front cover but was subsequently dropped. While the overall cover design remained relatively consistent, the background colours of some of the titles varied over time.

The Little Books format remained largely unchanged for more than 40 years allowing generations of children to add to their collections without interruption. Aside from the removal of the number from the front cover, the most notable design changes occurred on the back covers. The back covers of the early numbered editions featured only a chess piece motif, which was later replaced by a line drawing reproduced from an illustration within the book. By 1981, these line drawings were replaced by a list of all titles in the series, reintroducing numbering of the books. Only minor adjustments followed—such as the inclusion of a barcode around 1988 and the introduction of a revised numbering system along the spine by 1993.

By 2000, the traditional square format appeared to have been abandoned when the series was published by Caxton Publishing with a redesigned cover.

== Titles and Numbering ==
The original UK numbering of the Little Books series was:

1. Emily the Goat
2. Rusty the Sheepdog
3. Postman Joe
4. Mrs Nibble
5. Henry Goes Visiting
6. Mother Hen and Mary
7. Naughty George
8. Mrs Squirrel And Hazel
9. The Birthday Picnic
10. Ernest Owl Starts A School
11. The Adventures Of Walter
12. Lucy Mouse Keeps a Secret
13. Walter Duck and Winifred
14. Mrs Nibble Moves House
15. Christmas at Blackberry Farm
16. Sports Day at Blackberry Farm
17. Little Martha
18. A Bunny in Trouble
19. Hide and Seek at Blackberry Farm
20. Poor Mr Nibble
21. Snow at Blackberry Farm
22. Mr Nibble Calls a Doctor
23. Sam Sparrow
24. Saturday at Blackberry Farm
25. Mr Mole Takes Charge

By 1993, the series underwent a revision of its numbering system. Four titles were reassigned new positions at the end of the series: Sports Day at Blackberry Farm, originally listed as No. 16, was moved to No. 22; Henry Goes Visiting, formerly No. 5, became No. 23; The Birthday Picnic, previously No. 9, was renumbered as No. 24; and Christmas at Blackberry Farm, previously No. 15 was assigned No. 25. The remaining titles remained in their previous order but were renumbered accordingly to accommodate these changes.

The McKay US reprints were not in the same order.

== Elsewhere ==
Jane Pilgrim is the author of The Blackberry Farm Story Book, The Blackberry Farm Picture Book, Round the Year at Blackberry Farm (1985), and Around the Year at Blackberry Farm, A Fun and Educational Sticker Book. The artist F. Stock May illustrated the whole series.

The stories have been compiled into a number of partial and complete collections, including a hardback edition, and an edition published by W. H. Smith & Son Ltd. by arrangement with Hodder & Stoughton Children's Books in 1984.

They have also been produced in audio format including Favourite Tales from Blackberry Farm, Jane Pilgrim's Classic Children's Stories on Tape! read by Johnny Morris and Blackberry Farm Stories read by Nicolette McKenzie, both of which were available on cassette tape.

== Similar Children's Books ==
- The Tale of Peter Rabbit, 1901 book written and illustrated by Beatrix Potter.
- Brambly Hedge, a children's book series written and illustrated by Jill Barklam whose first titles were published in 1980.
