= Captain Lorrington "Gimlet" King =

Fictional character

Captain Lorrington "Gimlet" King is a character created by the British author W.E. Johns, best known as the creator of Biggles and Worrals. King's nickname is taken from a gimlet, a tool used for drilling small holes - and hence the term "gimlet-eyed", meaning someone with piercing eyes and keen vision. Johns is thought to have been inspired by Major 'Gimlet' Champion, one of his commanding officers during his flying career. The rest of the name may have been inspired by South African soldier and adventurer William Lorraine King who died shortly before the first novel was published.

The books which were published during and after World War II, are about the adventures of explorer-soldier "Gimlet" King, and his intrepid band of followers. His regular comrades are Corporal Albert "Copper" Edward Collson (an ex-policeman), Private "Trapper" Troublay, and Nigel Norman "Cub" Peters. Gimlet and his team of commandos were designed to represent the multiple ethnicities of the British Empire; along with the English characters, French-Canadian, Scots, and European-educated Asians co-operate for the good of Britain.

Several of the novels are set during World War II, especially in occupied Europe. The other books in the series revolve around treasure, and the post-war struggles in Britain's colonies and former colonies. In general the storylines of the books focus on actions behind enemy lines, or in foreign lands. In the book 'Gimlet Goes Again', the team work to rescue British slave labourers from a Renault factory in occupied France which is about to be bombed. In later stories, Gimlet seeks treasure, and must work as both hunter and prey when Werwolf terrorists try to exact revenge on those they call British "war criminals".

== Novels ==
1. King of the Commandos (1943)
2. Gimlet goes again (1944)
3. Gimlet comes home (1946)
4. Gimlet mops up (1947)
5. Gimlet's Oriental quest (1948)
6. Gimlet lends a hand (1949)
7. Gimlet bores in (1950)
8. Gimlet off the map (1951)
9. Gimlet gets the answer (1952)
10. Gimlet takes a job (1954)

== Short stories ==
- Comrades in Arms (1946/47). This book includes a short story An Oriental Assignment where Biggles flies Gimlet and his men to their operation site, and flies them back afterwards.

The Gimlet Regulars also appear significantly in Biggles follows on (1952)
