= The Girl's Own Paper =

British story paper, 1880–1956

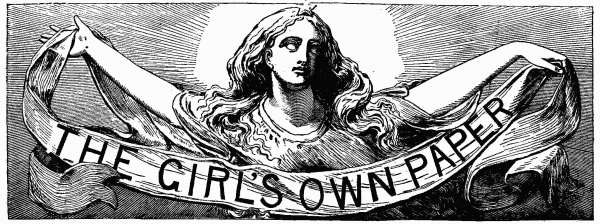
1886 masthead illustration, based on the sculpture The Spirit of Love and Truth by Joseph Edwards (1814-1882)

The Girl's Own Paper (G.O.P.) was a British story paper catering to girls and young women, published from 1880 until 1956.

== Publishing history ==
The first weekly number of The Girl's Own Paper appeared on 3 January 1880. As with its male counterpart The Boy's Own Paper, the magazine was published by the Religious Tract Society (which subsequently became Lutterworth Press). It was sold at a price of 1 penny.

In October 1929, the title became The Girl's Own Paper and Woman's Magazine but in 1930 the Woman's Magazine became a separate publication. In December 1947 the name was changed to The Girl's Own Paper and Heiress. By 1951 it was called Heiress incorporating the Girl's Own Paper. In 1956 Heiress closed down, and the name "Girl's Own Paper" ceased to exist. Facsimile reprints of volume 1 to 4 were published by Eureka Press, Japan, in 2006. Several editions are available online from Project Gutenberg.

== Contents ==
The story paper provided a mix of stories and educational and improving articles, with 'Answers to Correspondents' and occasional coloured plates, poetry and music. The paper funded and serialised the exploits of the explorer Kate Marsden in the 1890s when she was lauded by the Royal Geographical Society.

For the first 30 years, the weekly and later monthly issues included an unusual amount of music content, including musical scores by women composers. Judith Barger has produced a catalogue and discussed how the material reflected a gradual change in the perception of women's music making, from amateur accomplishment towards more professional roles.

From 1908, the weekly magazines were dropped and the paper included more information on serious careers for girls and advice on style and dress. Long serials became less common, being replaced by shorter stories. From the 1930s, a greater proportion of its material was directed at younger readers. There were school stories, stories of kidnapped princesses and articles about film stars, although the contents became more serious during World War II.

Volumes 39 and 40 of 1917–18 were entitled The Girls Own Paper and Woman's Magazine; presumably the two publications were merged for economy purposes as a result of World War I.

== Famous contributors ==
Many contributors are unknown outside the G.O.P. pages, but they include Noel Streatfeild, Eleanor Hoyt Brainerd, Rosa Nouchette Carey, Sarah Doudney (1841–1926), Angela Brazil, Lucy Maud Montgomery, Richmal Crompton, Fanny Fern, Baroness Orczy, and Norma Lorimer.

Between 1889 and 1901, the leading illustrator Henry William Brewer provided regular articles for the paper, often richly illustrated by his own drawings. Subjects included Interesting Monuments of Distinguished Women (1889), The Castle of Cleve and the 'Magic Swan' (1890), The Largest Churches in Europe (1891), Archeology for Girls (1895), Typical Church Towers of English Counties (1895), Old English Cottage Homes (1899), and Site Base Support and Superstructure – Ancient and Modern Methods of Building (1901). Prominent illustrators under editor Flora Klickmann included Walter Hayward-Young and Alice Maude Angell.

The writer and novelist John Francis Brewer, son of Henry William Brewer also contributed to the paper. In 1887-88 he collaborated with the editor, Charles Peters, describing in articles trips they had taken together in Norway, northern Italy and central Italy.

Between 1940 and 1947 Captain W. E. Johns contributed sixty stories featuring the female pilot Worrals.

== List of editors ==
- Charles Peters 1880–1907
- Flora Klickmann 1908–1931
- Gladys Spratt and others 1931–1956

== Role in popular culture ==
In her history of the G.O.P., E Honor Ward writes: "The G.O.P. was an important and positive influence on generations of girls and women, and a vital outlet for women's writing and ideas, for more than three-quarters of a century".
