= The Modern Boy =

British boys' magazine

The Modern Boy (later Modern Boy) was a British boys' magazine published between 1928 and 1939 by the Amalgamated Press. It ran to some 610 issues. It was first launched on 11 February 1928 and cost 2d (two old pence, when there were 240 pence to the pound: see pound sterling), the magazine ran to 523 weekly issues until 12 February 1938. The next week, on 19 February 1938 it was re-launched in a new size as Modern Boy (dropping the word "The") and its issues were re-numbered from number one again. It then ran until issue 87 published on 14 October 1939, before production ceased due to wartime paper shortages.

The Modern Boy was well known for the stories published in it, notably the works of W. E. Johns famous as the creator of Biggles. Johns initially painted the cover artwork for issue 98 and went on to submit other cover paintings and articles. His first signed article was published in issue number 148 (dated 6 December 1930) and was called "The Plane Smashers", but it is believed that he wrote articles earlier as "Our Air Expert". From issue 257, Johns's 'Biggles' stories were published and these ran in many issues until publication ceased in 1939. Firstly, all the individual stories from the first Biggles book (The Camels Are Coming) were published, and eventually Johns's new books were first published in 'The Modern Boy' in episode format, the true first editions of the stories. The stories were later published as books with changes in the text.

New and original Biggles stories were published in the Modern Boy and were later collected in the two 'Boy's Friend Library' books Biggles Learns to Fly and Biggles in France.
