= Flora Klickmann =

- Born: Emily Flora Klickmann; 26 January 1867; Brixton, London, England
- Died: 20 November 1958 (aged 91); Brockweir, Gloucestershire, England
- Other name: Emily Flora Henderson-Smith
- Occupations: Journalist, author, editor
- Years active: 1895–1948

Emily Flora Klickmann (26 January 1867 – 20 November 1958) was an English journalist, author and editor. She was the second editor of the Girl's Own Paper, but became best known for her Flower-Patch series of books of anecdotes, autobiography and nature description.

== Life ==
Flora Klickmann was born on 26 January 1867 in Brixton, London, one of six children of German-born Rudolf Klickmann and his wife, Fanny Warne. The family moved to Sydenham in south London when Flora was in her teens. She aspired to be a concert pianist, and studied at Trinity College of Music and at the Royal College of Organists. However, she was found to be suffering from arrhythmia, and was advised to rest. She travelled to the small Gloucestershire village of Brockweir in the Wye valley, where her mother's family lived, before returning to London. The illness she suffered from was quinsy, a complication of tonsillitis.

At the age of 21 she began writing on musical subjects for Sylvia's Home Journal and other magazines aimed at women, and by 1895 had started contributing articles and interviews with musicians to The Windsor Magazine, one of the best-known story periodicals of the time. Her mother died in 1903, when they were living at Ondine Road, East Dulwich, and her Prussian-born father, Rudolph Klickmann, remarried in 1908 and went to live in Battersea with his new wife – a Russian emigre. Flora stayed in the house in Dulwich until her marriage.

In 1904, she became the editor of The Foreign Field, a magazine published by the Wesleyan Methodist Missionary Society. By this time, she had also begun writing and editing books on crafts and etiquette, aimed at young girls. Four years later, in 1908, she was appointed editor of the Girl's Own Paper, in succession to its first editor, Charles Peters. This was a highly successful periodical aimed at girls and young women, published by the Religious Tract Society (RTS). The magazine moved from a weekly to monthly format, and she introduced new themes such as careers advice for girls, advice on style and dress, photography competitions and crafts. Long serials became less common, and their place was taken by a larger number of shorter stories, often from distant parts of the world.

In 1912 she suffered a breakdown through overwork and stress. While remaining as editor, she spent a period of convalescence at a rented cottage close to Brockweir. In June 1913, she married a widower, Ebenezer Henderson Smith (1851–1937), one of the executives at the RTS; her married name was Emily Flora Henderson Smith. The wedding was at St John the Evangelist, on Goose Green, East Dulwich. Their marital home was 'Hillthorpe' on Sydenham Hill; it was pulled down in the 1950s. The couple also purchased a second house at Brockweir, Sylvan View (now Sylvan House).

In May 1916 she published the first of a series of books of written sketches of life in her country cottage at Brockweir, known in her books as "Rosemary Cottage", with its idyllic cottage garden and spectacular views over the River Wye and Tintern Abbey. The book, The Flower-Patch Among the Hills, was based on articles which she had originally written for the Girl's Own Paper, and was highly successful; a reprint was needed after two weeks. She acquired a succession of cottages in the area over the years. In later years the stories grew to involve her household and the local people, combining nature description, anecdote, autobiography, religion, and humour. In all, seven Flower Patch books were published, over 32 years. Her writing has been described as "humorous, elegant and beautifully observed, revealing a genuine love and concern for the natural world". A keen environmentalist, she wrote of the virtues of gardening without artificial chemicals and the value of natural fertilisers long before they became fashionable, and decried the taking of wild flower bulbs.

She also published novels, advice books, children's stories and non-fiction on many topics including gardening, cooking, and needlework techniques, some of which have been republished in recent years. She remained editor of the Girl's Own Paper until 1931, when she and her husband retired permanently to Brockweir. However, she continued to write Flower Patch books until 1948.

She lived an increasingly reclusive life after her husband's death in 1937. She died in 1958, and was buried in the graveyard of the Moravian Church at Brockweir.

== Bibliography ==
=== The Flower-Patch Series ===
- The Flower-Patch Among the Hills (1916)
- Between the Larch Woods and the Weir (1917)
- The Trail Of The Ragged Robin (1921)
- Flower-Patch Neighbours (1928)
- Visitors At The Flower-Patch (1931)
- The Flower-Patch Garden Book (1933)
- Weeding the Flower-Patch (1948)

=== Others ===
- Little Sunshine Picture Book (n.d., ca 1890)
- The Rainy-Day Picture Book (1896)
- From Nursery Land (1897)
- At The Seaside (1897)
- How To Behave (editor, 1898)
- In Make-Believe Land (1899)
- The Language Of Flowers (1899)
- How To Dress (1900)
- In Pinafore-Land (1900)
- The Picture Gallery Of Animals (1900)
- The Lever That Moves The World (1903)
- Songs Of The Land Of The Stars And Stripes (1903)
- Etiquette Of To-Day (1903)
- The Ambitions Of Jenny Ingram (1911)
- The Home Art Crochet Book (editor, 1912)
- The Home Art Book of Fancy Stitchery (editor, 1912)
- The Craft of the Crochet Hook (editor, 1912)
- The Modern Crochet Book (editor, 1913)
- Artistic Crochet (editor, 1914)
- Flower Pictures (editor, 1914)
- The Cult of the Needle (editor, c.1914)
- The Mistress of the Little House (editor, 1915)
- The Modern Knitting Book (editor, 1915)
- The Little Girl's Knitting and Crochet Book (editor, 1915)
- The Little Girl's Sewing Book (editor, c.1915)
- Outdoor Pictures (editor, 1915)
- Beautiful Crochet on Household Linen (editor, 1916)
- The Little Girl's Bird Book (editor, 1917)
- Hardanger and Cross-Stitch (editor, 1918)
- The Little Girl's Fancy Work (editor, 1919)
- Needlework Economies (editor, 1919)
- Distinctive Crochet (editor, 1919)
- Pillow Lace and Hand-Worked Trimmings (editor, 1920)
- The Lure Of The Pen: A Book For Would-be Authors (1920)
- The Popular Knitting Book (editor, 1921)
- The Little Girl's Cooking Book (editor, 1923)
- The Little Girl's Sweet Book (editor, 1923)
- The Shining Way (1923)
- The Path to Fame (1925)
- Mending Your Nerves (1925)
- The Carillon of Scarpa (1925)
- Many Questions Answered (1928)
- The Lady-With-The-Crumbs (1931)
- Mystery In The Windflower Wood (1932)
- Delicate Fuss (1932)
- Victorian Fancy Stitchery: Techniques & Designs (2003 reprint of The Home Art Book of Fancy Stitchery)
- Victorian Needlework: Techniques & Designs (2003 reprint of The Cult of the Needle)
