= David Nicolle =

British historian

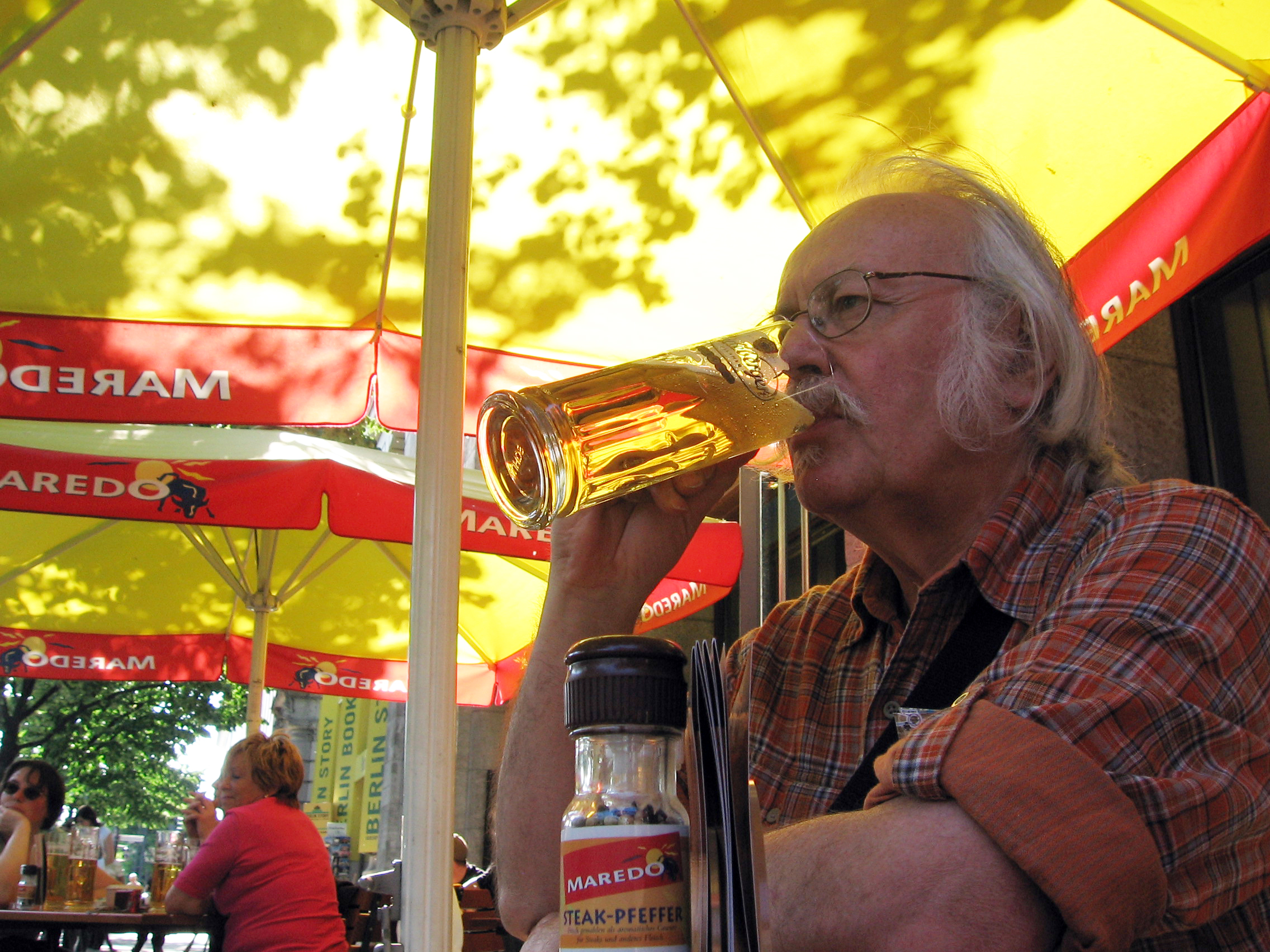
- Born: 4 April 1944 (age 82); London
- Occupation: Historian
- Writing career
- Subjects: Military history: Middle East; Medieval warfare

David C. Nicolle (born 4 April 1944) is a British historian specialising in the military history of the Middle Ages, with a particular interest in the Middle East. Much of his works been for the historical books of Osprey Publishing

== Life ==
David Nicolle worked for BBC Arabic before getting his MA at SOAS, University of London. He gained a PhD at the University of Edinburgh in year 1982. His PhD is titled The Military Technology of Classical Islam. He lectured in World and Islamic art and architecture at Yarmouk University, Jordan. He was also on the editorial board of the Medieval History Magazine.

Nicolle married an American, Colette Giroux in 1976; they have a son Frederick Joseph ("Fred", born 1982) and a daughter Dr. Antoinette Laura ("Nette", born 1984). He now lives and works in Chipping Barnet, London.

== Selected works ==
- (1990) Attila and the Nomad Hordes: Warfare on the Eurasian Steppes 4th-12th centuries, Osprey Publishing, ISBN 0-85045-996-6
- David Nicolle (1990). The Mongol Warlords. Firebird Books. ISBN 1-85314-104-6 – via Internet Archive.
- (1991) French Medieval Armies 1000-1300. London: Osprey Publishing, ISBN 1-85532-127-0
- (1992) Arthur and the Anglo-Saxon Wars: Anglo-Celtic Warfare, A.D.410-1066, Osprey Publishing, ISBN 0-85045-548-0
- (1993) Armies of the Muslim Conquest, Osprey Publishing, ISBN 1-85532-279-X
- (1993) Hattin 1187: Saladin's Greatest Victory, Osprey Publishing, ISBN 1-85532-284-6
- (1994) The Ottoman Army 1914-1918, Osprey Publishing
- (1995) Medieval Warfare Source Book: Warfare in Western Christendom, Brockhampton Press, ISBN 1-86019-889-9
- (1996) Medieval Warfare Source Book: Christian Europe and its Neighbours, Brockhampton Press, ISBN 1-86019-861-9
- (1997) The History of Medieval Life, Hamlyn
- (1998) Crusader Warfare: Muslims, Mongols and the Struggle Against the Crusades, Osprey Publishing, ISBN 1-85532-697-3
- (1999) Arms and Armour of the Crusading Era, 1050-1350: Western Europe and the Crusader States, Greenhill Books, ISBN 1-85367-347-1
- (2000) Crecy, 1346: Triumph of the Black Prince, Osprey Publishing, ISBN 1-85532-966-2.
- (2000) French Armies of the Hundred Years War. London: Osprey Publishing, ISBN 1-85532-710-4.
- (2001) Knight Hospitaller, volumes I and II; Osprey Publishing, Botley, Oxfordshire
- (2002) Warriors and Their Weapons Around the Time of the Crusades: Relationships Between Byzantium, the West and the Islamic World, Ashgate, ISBN 0-86078-898-9
- (2004) Poitiers 1356: The Capture of a King, Osprey Publishing, ISBN 1-84176-516-3.
- (2005) Crusader Castles in the Holy Land 1192-1302. Osprey Publishing, ISBN 1-84176-827-8.
- (2005) Crecy 1346: Triumph of the Longbow, Greenwood Press, ISBN 0-275-98843-0
- (2007) Crusader Castles in Cyprus, Greece and the Aegean 1191-1571, Osprey Publishing, ISBN 1-84176-976-2.
- (2007) Fighting for the Faith: Crusade and Jihad 1000–1500 AD, Pen & Sword Military, ISBN 1-84415-614-1
- (2010) Cross and Crescent in the Balkans: The Ottoman Conquest of Southeastern Europe (14th - 15th Centuries), ISBN 978-1-844-15954-3.
- (2011) Saladin: Leadership - Strategy - Conflict. Osprey Publishing, ISBN 978-1-84908-317-1
- (2012) The Fall of English France 1449-53. Osprey Publishing, ISBN 978-1-84908-616-5.

=== Collaborations ===
- (2005) with Christopher Gravett: Battles of the Middle Ages, Greenwood Press, ISBN 0-275-98837-6
- (2007) with J. Haldon and Stephen Turnbull: Fall of Constantinople: The Ottoman Conquest of Byzantium, Osprey Publishing, ISBN 1-84603-200-8

=== As editor ===
- (2002) Companion to Medieval Arms and Armour, Boydell Press, ISBN 0-85115-872-2
