= Artistic tone =

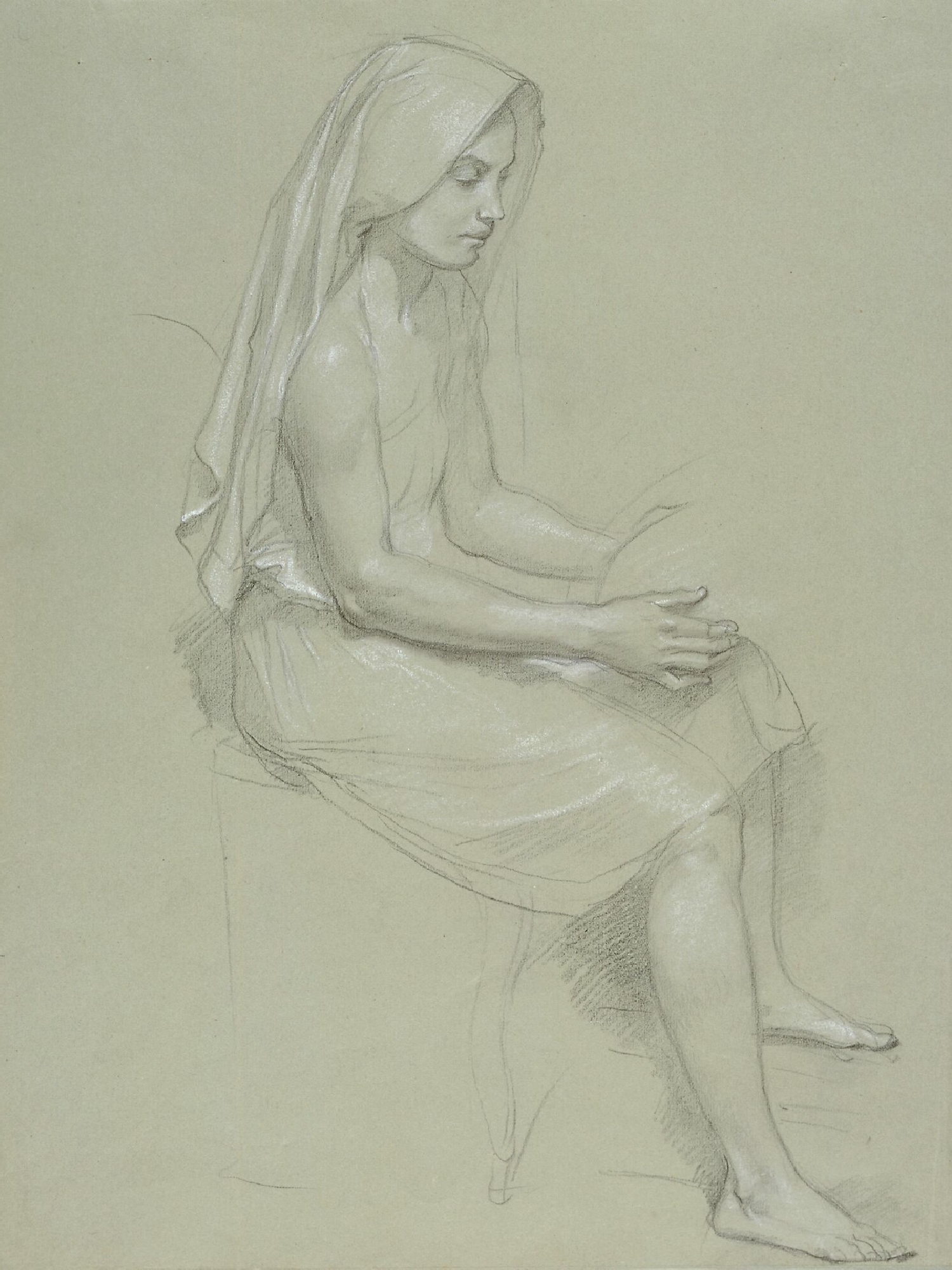
Chiaroscuro study drawing by Bouguereau

Tone in an artistic context refers to the light and dark values, which is used to render a realistic object, or to create an abstract composition. When using pastel, an artist may often use a colored paper support, using areas of pigment to define lights and darks, while leaving the bare support to show through as the mid-tone.

When making a portrait for example heavy dark tones to represent a moody or dark side to a personality. Tone can also be used to make the face look three-dimensional, for example darker tones around the chin, nose and eyes; lighter tones on forehead, nose and cheeks.

== See also ==
- Zone System
- Chiaroscuro
