= Worrals =

Fictional character

Cover of Worrals on the War-path (1943)

Flight Officer Joan Worralson, better known as "Worrals", is a fictional character created by W. E. Johns, more famous for his series of books about the airman Biggles.

Worrals was a member of the Women's Auxiliary Air Force (WAAF) in the Second World War. She has a sidekick called Betty "Frecks" Lovell.

Johns modelled Worrals on two female aviators of his acquaintance, Amy Johnson—whom he knew as "Johnnie" Mollison, from which Worrals' name is presumed to derive—and Pauline Gower.

== Novels ==
The first six books were written and set during the Second World War; the remainder mainly in places remote or exotic to European readers. The Worrals series was very successful in the UK (published by the Lutterworth Press) and France (Presses de la Cité) and translated into several other languages. Most titles included line illustrations by the British artist Leslie L Stead. The first three Worrals books were republished in 2013 by IndieBooks with new illustrations by US graphic novelist Matt Kindt.

1. Worrals of the W.A.A.F. (1941)
2. Worrals Carries On (1942)
3. Worrals Flies Again (1942)
4. Worrals on the War-path (1943)
5. Worrals Goes East (1944)
6. Worrals of the Islands (1945)
7. Worrals in the Wilds (1947)
8. Worrals Down Under (1948)
9. Worrals in the Wastelands (1949)
10. Worrals Goes Afoot (1949)
11. Worrals Investigates (1950)

== Short stories ==
There were three short stories featuring Worrals written by Johns:

1. "Worrals Takes a Hand" – published in The Children's Gift Book by Odhams in 1946
2. "On the Home Front" – published in Comrades in Arms by Hodder & Stoughton in August 1947
3. "Worrals Works it Out" – published in The Girl's Own Paper in September 1947

== Other media ==
- In Alan Moore's The League of Extraordinary Gentlemen: Black Dossier, MI5 picks Worrals to lead an incarnation of the League as replacement for deserter Mina Murray, as well as to draw female attention to the military. "Frecks" is implied to be more than a sidekick, and she rebuffs the advances from William Samson, Jr., the Wolf of Kabul. Worrals's League is dissolved after their first mission ends in catastrophic failure.
