= The Lutterworth Press =

Independent British publishing house now based in Cambridge

- Predecessor: Religious Tract Society
- Founded: 1932
- Country of origin: United Kingdom
- Headquarters location: Cambridge, England
- Distribution: self-distributed (UK); Casemate Academic (US)
- Publication types: Books
- Imprints: James Clarke and Co Ltd, Acorn Editions
- Official website: www.lutterworth.com

The Lutterworth Press, one of the oldest independent British publishing houses, has traded since the late eighteenth century, initially as the Religious Tract Society (RTS). The main areas of publication have been religion and theology, children's books and books for young people (with an emphasis on "improving literature" and books with "moral values"), and general adult non-fiction.

The religious list, as with the RTS, tended to publish fairly evangelical writers, such as Norman Grubb, but gradually broadened in the second half of the twentieth century.

Well-known general writers first published by Lutterworth include David Attenborough and Patrick Moore. The list specialises in popular history and art history, but also publishes books on a wide range of other subjects.

The children's list, which built on the strength of the Boy's Own Paper and Girl's Own Paper, has included well-known authors such as Enid Blyton, W.E. Johns, Kathleen Fidler and Laura Ingalls Wilder.

The Lutterworth Press was named after the small English town of Lutterworth in Leicestershire, where John Wyclif served as Rector in the fourteenth century, has been used since 1932, and Lutterworth continued most of the then current RTS publications. The Press was originally based in London before expanding its operations to Guildford in Surrey where it operated from until 1983. It has been based in Cambridge, England since 1984. In a period where "most long-established publishers have been absorbed into faceless multinational groups", Lutterworth has maintained its "editorial existence".

Lutterworth was the "first British publishing house to have branches in Africa and Asia" and in the late 19th century and early 20th century it issued "language dictionaries and other works in many indigenous languages".

The book From the Dairyman's Daughter to Worrals of the WAAF: The R.T.S., Lutterworth Press and Children's Literature, edited by Dennis Butts and Pat Garrett, 2006, chronicles the history of the publishing house.

== Book series ==
- A History of the Early Church
- Antique Pocket Guides
- Bible Guides
- Boy's Own Companion
- Century of -- Series
- The Collectors' Library
- Courage and Conquest Series
- Crown Library
- Dominion Library
- Gateway Series
- The Golden Way Series
- Junior Gateway Series
- Junior Wren Books
- The Pathway Series
- Roland Allen Library
- Stories of Faith and Fame
- Wren Books
