= Biggles =

Fictional pilot by W. E. Johns

James Bigglesworth
- Biggles character
- Cover of Biggles of 266
- First appearance: "The White Fokker" (1932)
- Last appearance: Biggles Air Ace: The Uncollected Stories (1999)
- Created by: W. E. Johns
- Portrayed by: Neville Whiting; Neil Dickson

In-universe information
- Full name: James Charles Bigglesworth
- Nickname: Biggles
- Gender: Male
- Occupation: Pilot
- Family: Charles Bigglesworth (brother)
- Relatives: Algernon Lacey (cousin) Brigadier-General Bigglesworth (Uncle)
- Nationality: English (raised in British India)

James Charles Bigglesworth, nicknamed "Biggles", is a fictional pilot and adventurer, the title character and hero of the Biggles series of adventure books, written for young readers by W. E. Johns (1893–1968). Biggles made his first appearance in the story "The White Fokker", published in the first issue of Popular Flying magazine and again as part of the first collection of Biggles stories, The Camels Are Coming (both 1932). Johns continued to write "Biggles books" until his death in 1968. The series eventually included nearly a hundred volumes – novels as well as short story collections – most of the latter with a common setting and time.

The chronology of the canon, spanning both world wars, set up certain inconsistencies over the unavoidable ageing of Biggles and his friends. Also later editions had to be somewhat edited in line with changing norms of acceptability, especially regarding race, and in view of the pre-teenage readership who increasingly favoured both the books and the comics.

== Synopsis ==
Biggles first appears as a teenaged "scout" (fighter) pilot in the Royal Flying Corps (RFC) during the First World War. He joined the RFC in 1916 at the age of 17, having conveniently "lost" his birth certificate. Biggles represents a particularly British hero, combining professionalism with a gentlemanly air. Under the stress of combat he develops from a slightly hysterical youth prone to practical jokes to a calm, confident, competent leader. He is occasionally given "special" (secret) missions by the shadowy figure of Colonel (initially Major) Raymond (Air Commodore in later books, reflecting the creation of the Royal Air Force with its own ranks), who is already involved with the intelligence side of operations. Biggles is accompanied by his cousin Algernon ('Algy') Lacey and his mechanic Flight Sergeant Smyth, who accompany Biggles on his adventures after the war. Added to the team in 1935 is the teenager Ginger Hebblethwaite.

== Biggles and his creator ==
W. E. Johns was himself a First World War pilot, although his own career did not parallel that of Biggles particularly closely. The author's initial war service was as an infantryman, fighting at Gallipoli and on the Macedonian front. He was commissioned as a second lieutenant in September 1917, seconded to the Royal Flying Corps and posted back to England for flight training: Johns served as a flying instructor in England until August 1918, when he transferred to the Western Front. On 16 September 1918, his De Havilland DH4 was shot down on a bombing raid. His observer, Lieutenant Amey, was killed (in two of the stories in Biggles Learns to Fly, observers flying with Biggles are killed or badly wounded), but Johns survived to be taken prisoner of war. Johns remained with the RAF until 1927, latterly as an administrative officer rather than a pilot: his final rank was Flying Officer (equivalent to Lieutenant in the RFC) rather than the "Capt." that formed part of his pen name.

While the purpose of the Biggles stories was to entertain adolescent boys, in the First World War books Johns paid attention to historical detail and helped recreate the primitive days of early air combat, in which pilots often died the first time they were in action and before devices such as oxygen supply and parachutes for those on board had become practical. Various models on which the Biggles character might have been based have been suggested, including rugby player and WWI flying ace Cyril Lowe, fighter pilot Albert Ball, and air commodore Arthur Bigsworth. Johns stated that the character was a composite of many individuals in the RFC (including himself).

The bulk of the Biggles stories are set after the First World War, and after Johns' flying career was over. Biggles has an unusually lengthy career, flying a number of aircraft representative of the history of British military aviation, from Sopwith Camels during the First World War, Hawker Hurricanes and Supermarine Spitfires in the Second World War, right up to the Hawker Hunter jet fighter in the postwar adventure Biggles in the Terai. In these later books geographic and historical accuracy is less evident and the grim detail of the first stories is moderated for an increasingly younger readership. The books were successful and were translated into Czech, Danish, Dutch, Finnish, French, German, Hungarian, Icelandic, Italian, Norwegian, Portuguese, Spanish and Swedish.

== Fictional biography ==
=== Early life ===
According to stories in The Boy Biggles and Biggles Goes to School, James Bigglesworth was born in India in May 1899, the son of an administrator in the Indian Civil Service and his wife. James was the younger of two sons, Charles being the elder by five years. The young James had little contact with European culture and commenced a lifelong affection for India, befriending the local Indian boys, exploring the countryside and learning to speak fluent Hindi. He retained a lifetime gift for languages and as an adult spoke French and German fluently, with a "fair command" of other languages. He spent holidays in England, under the custody of "Dickpa", an eccentric uncle and inventor who lived in rural Buckinghamshire. When Biggles, now an adult, visits Dickpa, his father's brother, again, an adventure begins that takes both men to Brazil (the Cruise of the Condor). Biggles then attended Malton Hall School in Hertbury, England. His first encounter with an aircraft was with a Blériot that landed on the school cricket ground.

=== First World War ===
Biggles left school and initially joined the army as a subaltern in the Royal Flying Corps and learned to fly in the summer of 1916, at No. 17 Flying Training School, which was at Settling, Norfolk, flying solo after two hours of instruction. He then attended No. 4 'School of Fighting' in Frensham, Lincolnshire.

Posted to France with under 15 hours, dual and solo, he first flew in combat in September 1916 with 169 Squadron, RFC, (commanded by Major Paynter). His observer was another youth named Mark Way, a New Zealander. Biggles began flying the F.E.2b "pusher" and later the Bristol F2B. In late summer 1917, he was transferred to 266 Squadron RFC, commanded by Major Mullen. With 266 Squadron, Biggles flew the Sopwith Pup and the famed Sopwith Camel, developing a friendly rivalry with 'Wilks' (Captain Wilkinson) and the S.E.5s of 287 squadron and forming a close friendship with his young cousin Algy (the Hon. Algernon Montgomery Lacey). A study of the short stories featuring his First World War exploits, suggests that he had a 'score' of 49 aircraft, three balloons and one submarine, while himself being shot down or crash-landing eight times. He was awarded the Distinguished Service Order and the Military Cross.

=== Between the Wars ===
After the Great War, Biggles' adventures as a freelance charter pilot, took him around the world in an unidentified amphibian named the "Vandal" (often illustrated on covers, anachronistically, as either a Supermarine Walrus or Supermarine Sea Otter). The nearest "real" aircraft that fits W. E. Johns description of the "Vandal", is a Vickers Viking Mk 4. His team grows when he and Algy meet young Ginger Hebblethwaite in The Black Peril, while foiling a possible plot against Britain. Post-Second World War editions of the book change this plot from a German to a Russian plot. Ginger brings the energy and daring of youth to these and many of their later adventures. Between the wars Biggles and his friends mix their own escapades with ventures on behalf of British Secret Service.

=== Second World War ===
Biggles returned to service in the Second World War, initially with a Supermarine S6B type machine in the Baltic Sea and then to defy the Nazis and their allies in Norway. He then took up his post as Commanding Officer of 666 Squadron, RAF, a Special Duties squadron that fought in the Battle of Britain before being sent around the world on specific assignments. Biggles, Algy, Smyth and Hebblethwaite are joined by a new companion, the monocle-wearing Lord Bertram 'Bertie' Lissie. The changed setting forced Johns to update his material with references to new flying slang and aeroplanes, unsuccessfully at first but later with more realism. Biggles' new squadron includes a diverse cast, including the American 'Tex' O'Hara (from Texas), the Welshman 'Taffy' Hughes, the Cockney 'Tug' Carrington, the Oxford graduate Henry Harcourt and George 'Ferocity' Ferris from the streets of Liverpool.

=== Special Air Police ===
After the Second World War Johns reinvents Biggles' career yet again, with his former boss Air Commodore Raymond hiring him as a "flying detective" for Scotland Yard. Biggles returns to his rooms in Mount Street, Mayfair and assumes a role as head of the new Special Air Police division with Algy, Ginger and Bertie making up the flying squad. The group takes on criminals who have taken to the air, both at home in Britain and around the globe, as well as battling opponents behind the Iron Curtain. The team fly a wide variety of machines, with Auster and Percival types doing much of the work.

Johns continued writing Biggles short stories and novels up until his death in 1968; in all, nearly 100 Biggles books were published.

A final unfinished novel, Biggles Does Some Homework, shows Biggles at last preparing to retire and meeting his mixed-race replacement; Johns died while writing this novel. The 12 completed chapters were issued privately in 1997.

== Characters ==
=== Algernon Montgomery Lacey ===
The Honourable Algernon Montgomery Lacey or "Algy" is a cousin who is posted to Biggles' flight in 266 Squadron by the influence of his aunt. Despite initial misgivings, the two soon become very close friends and eventually Algy adopts the role of Biggles' second in command. In the books set in the 1930s, Algy, Ginger and Smyth become Biggles' regular companions.

=== Ginger Hebblethwaite ===
Ginger (his real first name is never revealed) first appears in The Black Peril (1935) as a teenage runaway found hiding in a railway shed. Ginger left his father, a mineworker in Smettleworth, after an argument about Ginger's determination to become a pilot. When he first meets Biggles, he tells him he is on his way to London to join the RAF. Biggles immediately calls him Ginger because of his red hair. He proves his worth by rescuing Biggles from some enemy agents. He becomes one of the regular team and is often Biggles's chosen companion. He is a talented mechanic and his speech is peppered with youthful slang and Americanisms, learned from the cinema.

=== Flight Sergeant Smyth ===
Flight Sergeant Smyth is Biggles' trusty mechanic and logistic organiser since they first worked together in 266 Squadron during the First World War. In addition to serving as a mechanic for Biggles's squadron during both World Wars, Smyth accompanies the group on various expeditions, including those depicted in The Cruise of the Condor and Biggles Goes to War. Recognized for his technical proficiency, Smyth is consistently portrayed as a highly skilled mechanic who maintains the professional respect of his colleagues throughout the series.

=== Lord Bertie Lissie ===
First appearing in Spitfire Parade (1941), Lord Bertie is a pilot in 666 Squadron. An eccentric former racing driver, who flies with a hunting horn and a monocle, Bertie joins Biggles in the Air Police in most of the post-war stories. He is characterized as a brave and talented fighter, an expert shot and has a lot of handy knowledge on a range of unusual subjects.

=== Tug Carrington ===
A counterpoint to Lord Bertie, Tug is a boxer from the slums of London. His parents being killed in the war, Tug is out for revenge and can be a very risky person to have around. He scorns alcohol, much to the amusement of his fellow squadron members. In return for Biggles setting him up for a job as a London cabby, he occasionally helps Biggles and his gang on their missions after the Second World War.

=== Erich von Stalhein ===
Biggles' greatest opponent is the German intelligence officer Erich von Stalhein, a member of an old Prussian family of soldiers. They first meet in Biggles Flies East, in which Biggles is a spy in the Middle East during the First World War, having some narrow escapes. Von Stalhein returns as an adversary in numerous other adventures: in Biggles & Co. he is the leader of a group of smugglers based in a medieval castle somewhere in Germany. As the Cold War begins, von Stalhein enters the services of the Communist bloc, until his new masters imprison him on the island of Sakhalin, from where Biggles helps him to escape in Biggles Buries a Hatchet. Von Stalhein then settles in London and he and Biggles remain in touch. It is from von Stalhein that Biggles learns that Janis (see "Female characters" below) survived the Second World War and was imprisoned in Czechoslovakia, from where Biggles rescues her and goes on to support her in England.

=== William Raymond ===
First appears as a major (later colonel) in the British Intelligence service during the First World War, in which capacity he organises secret ("special") missions in which Biggles takes part. In later books, he reappeared as an air commodore.The name William was used in the 1986 film. In the books the only reference is to his initials, "R. B." Raymond.

=== Female characters ===
In the Biggles stories, female characters appear infrequently. Despite brief affairs, Biggles and his chums remain steadfastly single. Biggles suffers a disappointment in the First World War, when he falls in love with German spy Marie Janis in the short story "Affaire de Coeur", set in 1918. Rather than being considered asexual or a repressed homosexual, Biggles' relationship with Janis suggests he is a romantic hero, "tragically loyal to the only woman he ever really loved".

In Biggles & Co. Stella Carstairs, the daughter of the man Biggles helps, turns up. A pilot herself, she is concerned for Biggles's safety and tells him more than once not to take on her father's request.

In Biggles Flies Again (1934), Algy becomes close to Consuelo, the daughter of the President of Bolivia, but is dissuaded from continuing the relationship by Biggles, "... unless you intend marrying her". In Biggles Fails to Return (1943), Ginger falls in love with the sister of the French pilot who has flown Biggles into France on a secret mission and at the end of the story Ginger gets to spend several weeks in her company while awaiting transport back to England. The young Ginger is also smitten by the beautiful Polynesian girl Full Moon, in Biggles in the South Seas (1940).

There is a discussion of the issue of Biggles, sex and alcohol in By Jove, Biggles: The Life of Captain W. E. Johns (1981) by Peter Berresford Ellis and Piers Williams.

In the 1950s, a popular Australian radio version of Biggles, The Air Adventures of Biggles, was made under licence. Johns did not write the scripts and apparently ended the contract after receiving complaints from young readers that the storyline had made Biggles "go soft" by taking up a blonde female lover.

Another female character appears in the form of Worrals (Flight Officer Joan Worralson), eponymous heroine of a related series of books featuring this resourceful and "plucky" member of the WAAF. A further Johns creation, the commando Captain Lorrington "Gimlet" King, also features in a series of books that intersect with Biggles at times.

== Criticism and controversies ==
=== Time ===
The settings of the Biggles books are spread over more than 50 years; this produces a number of credibility difficulties, especially for older readers.

Though Biggles and his friends age in the books, they do so much more slowly (and inconsistently) than is historically credible. For instance, Biggles (with some of his First World War "chums"), who at that point should be well into their forties, are still relatively junior squadron officers flying Spitfires during the Battle of Britain. In the stories set after the end of the Second World War, Biggles and Algy, in particular, are, by the rules of arithmetic, passing into their fifties and early sixties, while retaining levels of activity and lifestyle more typical of people at least thirty years younger.

Even within a group of stories set in the same time frame, there are some chronological inconsistencies:

- Algy, for instance, seems to be younger than Biggles to a degree that is impossible, at least by the ordinary calendar.
- Biggles first meets Algy in The Camels Are Coming, at the end of which the First World War ends. However, Algy also features throughout Biggles in France, so the whole of Biggles in France must be set during the second half of The Camels Are Coming.
- Biggles seems to receive the same promotion multiple times.

It is doubtful whether a careful rearrangement of the various First World War stories could result in a coherent sequence. When W. E. Johns started the Biggles series, he can hardly have anticipated that he would be called on to write so many Biggles stories to short editorial deadlines, so that such inconsistencies are perhaps inevitable.

The author succeeds reasonably well in chronicling developments in aviation technology, but social and cultural changes are much more difficult. The cultural and social world of Biggles (whether in the 1930s or some earlier period) does not persist completely unchanged through the whole series – for instance, in an early book, the evidence points to an English nobleman as the perpetrator but Biggles dismisses this out of hand as the gentry would never commit a crime; in a later novel, one of the gentry is the villain. Nonetheless, the social context of the books, viewed in chronological order, does become increasingly old-fashioned, even anachronistic, especially in those works set after the Second World War.

=== Allegations of racism ===
Since the Biggles books were first published, attitudes to race and ethnicity have changed. A perception of Biggles during the 1960s and 1970s as unacceptably racially prejudiced, especially considered as children's literature, led to the removal of the Biggles books from the shelves of many public and school libraries. Historian Marika Sherwood objected to Johns' use of "chinks" and "coolies" to describe people of Chinese origin in Biggles Hits the Trail (1935). Biggles' enemy is a group called the Chungs who "chatter monkey-like". Jeff Sparrow, writing in The Guardian in 2014, commented: "the later books, in particular, manifest all the racism you’d expect from an Empire loyalist writing in the sour era of British decline." In 2000, Dennis Butts suggested in an essay that Johns' Biggles stories had to be viewed historically and that he was not a "deliberate racist".

Biggles was raised in British India, speaks fluent Hindi and has Indian friends and colleagues. In Biggles Goes to School, on one occasion when told to write lines in Latin, he remarks that he would rather do so in Hindi. On another occasion the adult Biggles asserts to Air Commodore Raymond that "while men are decent to me I try to be decent to them, regardless of race, colour, politics, creed or anything else". While individually developed non-white characters are infrequent, according to David Milner in Children and Race (1975), when they are part of the story, they are usually "positive", from the Oxford-educated "Chinaman", Li Chi, in Biggles Flies Again and Biggles Delivers the Goods and the perky Polynesian girl, Full Moon, in Biggles in the South Seas, to Alexander MacKay, a part "Red Indian" nicknamed "Minnie" who joins "the chums" as a valued colleague and is even set to inherit Biggles' job in Biggles Does Some Homework. Milner observed that the positive characteristics of these characters include relatively light complexions, Western education and general usefulness to the white hero and his friends and allies.

There are instances in which unpleasant "foreigners" are mixed race, and Johns has been accused of stereotyping non-whites. With the already mentioned "Chungs" of Biggles Hits the Trail, and the Aboriginals of Biggles in Australia, in particular, Johns applies stereotypes typical of his time to non-white opponents of his hero. In Biggles in Borneo, Dayak headhunters are stereotyped as barely human "savages", even though they are Biggles' allies against the Japanese. The portrayals of non-whites in these books (and others in the Biggles canon) is typical of a once common genre of fiction for young people.

=== "Adult" themes ===
The early Biggles stories and novels, especially those set in First World War, were apparently written mainly for older adolescents. Death is a frequent theme, sometimes treated in quite a grim fashion. Other "adult themes" are also touched on: more than once Biggles sets out on a mission in a "red mist", inspired by the death of a comrade. The emotional strain of combat is also realistically described, as Biggles becomes a "highly-strung" fidgeting pale youth, lacking his usual sense of humour. In these stories, in particular, alcohol is mentioned occasionally and cigarettes are much in evidence. The early First World War books were reprinted in the 1950s, when the Biggles books had acquired a younger readership and were bowdlerised. In the short story The Balloonatics, as republished in Biggles of the Special Air Police, the prize for capturing a German observation balloon was altered from a case of Scotch whisky to a case of lemonade. The reprint also removes all references to drinking and swearing.

Even the original editions contain no explicit sexual content and the traditional values of bravery, honesty and fair play are stressed. Romantic stories, which would have bored Johns' younger readers and embarrassed his older ones, are on the whole avoided, with the odd exception, such as in Biggles Looks Back, where he and von Stalhein rescue Marie Janis (with whom Biggles was briefly in love in an earlier story) from her prison in Bohemia.

== List of books ==
1. The Camels Are Coming (1932)
2. The Cruise of the Condor (1933)
3. Biggles of the Camel Squadron (1934)
4. Biggles Flies Again (1934)
5. Biggles Learns to Fly (1935)
6. The Black Peril (1935)
7. Biggles Flies East (1935)
8. Biggles Hits the Trail (1935)
9. Biggles in France (1935)
10. Biggles & Co (1936)
11. Biggles in Africa (1936)
12. Biggles – Air Commodore (1937)
13. Biggles Flies West (1937)
14. Biggles Flies South (1938)
15. Biggles Goes to War (1938)
16. The Rescue Flight (1939)
17. Biggles in Spain (1939)
18. Biggles Flies North (1939)
19. Biggles – Secret Agent (1940)
20. Biggles in the Baltic (1940)
21. Biggles in the South Seas (1940)
22. Biggles Defies the Swastika (1941)
23. Biggles Sees It Through (1941)
24. Spitfire Parade (1941)
25. Biggles in the Jungle (1942)
26. Biggles Sweeps the Desert (1942)
27. Biggles – Charter Pilot (1943)
28. Biggles in Borneo (1943)
29. Biggles Fails to Return (1943)
30. Biggles in the Orient (1945)
31. Biggles Delivers the Goods (1946)
32. Sergeant Bigglesworth CID (1947)
33. Biggles' Second Case (1948)
34. Biggles Hunts Big Game (1948)
35. Biggles Takes a Holiday (1948)
36. Biggles Breaks the Silence (1949)
37. Biggles Gets His Men (1950)
38. Another Job for Biggles (1951)
39. Biggles Goes to School (1951)
40. Biggles Works It Out (1952)
41. Biggles Takes the Case (1952)
42. Biggles Follows On (1952)
43. Biggles – Air Detective (1952)
44. Biggles and the Black Raider (1953)
45. Biggles in the Blue (1953)
46. Biggles in the Gobi (1953)
47. Biggles of the Special Air Police (1953)
48. Biggles Cuts It Fine (1954)
49. Biggles and the Pirate Treasure (1954)
50. Biggles Foreign Legionnaire (1954)
51. Biggles Pioneer Air Fighter (1954)
52. Biggles in Australia (1955)
53. Biggles' Chinese Puzzle (1955)
54. Biggles of 266 (1956)
55. No Rest for Biggles (1956)
56. Biggles Takes Charge (1956)
57. Biggles Makes Ends Meet (1957)
58. Biggles of the Interpol (1957)
59. Biggles on the Home Front (1957)
60. Biggles Presses On (1958)
61. Biggles on Mystery Island (1958)
62. Biggles Buries a Hatchet (1958)
63. Biggles in Mexico (1959)
64. Biggles' Combined Operation (1959)
65. Biggles at the World's End (1959)
66. Biggles and the Leopards of Zinn (1960)
67. Biggles Goes Home (1960)
68. Biggles and the Poor Rich Boy (1960)
69. Biggles Forms a Syndicate (1961)
70. Biggles and the Missing Millionaire (1961)
71. Biggles Goes Alone (1962)
72. Orchids for Biggles (1962)
73. Biggles Sets a Trap (1962)
74. Biggles Takes It Rough (1963)
75. Biggles Takes a Hand (1963)
76. Biggles' Special Case (1963)
77. Biggles and the Plane That Disappeared (1963)
78. Biggles Flies to Work (1963)
79. Biggles and the Lost Sovereigns (1964)
80. Biggles and the Black Mask (1964)
81. Biggles Investigates (1964)
82. Biggles Looks Back (1965)
83. Biggles and the Plot That Failed (1965)
84. Biggles and the Blue Moon (1965)
85. Biggles Scores a Bull (1965)
86. Biggles in the Terai (1966)
87. Biggles and the Gun Runners (1966)
88. Biggles Sorts It Out (1967)
89. Biggles and the Dark Intruder (1967)
90. Biggles and the Penitent Thief (1967)
91. Biggles and the Deep Blue Sea (1967)
92. The Boy Biggles (1968)
93. Biggles in the Underworld (1968)
94. Biggles and the Little Green God (1969)
95. Biggles and the Noble Lord (1969)
96. Biggles Sees Too Much (1970)
97. Biggles Does Some Homework (1997)
98. Biggles Air Ace: The Uncollected Stories (1999)
- Comrades in Arms (1947) included one Biggles story, plus stories of Gimlet and Worrals – other creations of Johns
- The Biggles Book of Heroes (1959)
- The Biggles Book of Treasure Hunting (1962)
- Pearson, John (1978). Biggles: The Authorised Biography. Sidgwick & Jackson.

Johns died while still writing Biggles Does Some Homework. Although never completed, it was released in 1998 by Norman Wright Publishing as a strictly limited edition of 300 copies in paperback. A further limited print run of 300 hardback copies was printed in 2007.

== In other media ==
=== Television ===
Biggles appeared in a TV series based on the books with Neville Whiting playing the title role. There were 44 B&W untitled episodes of 30 minutes, which were made by Granada and ran from 1 April till 9 September 1960. Biggles was a Detective Air Inspector attached to Scotland Yard. Helping him were Ginger (John Leyton) and Bertie (David Drummond) and they fought against villains like von Stalhein (Carl Duering).

=== Films ===
He was also featured in the feature film Biggles (1986), directed by John Hough with Neil Dickson in the title role. The film attempted to add appeal to the character by adding a science fiction element but it was a commercial and critical failure. Dickson reprised the character in all but name in the Pet Shop Boys' feature film, It Couldn't Happen Here.

=== Video games ===
In 1986, a video game was released as a tie-in to the Biggles film by Mirrorsoft for the platforms Amstrad CPC, Commodore 64 and ZX Spectrum. It included levels based in 1917 and other levels set in modern-day London.

=== Comics ===
Many versions of Biggles comics have been published in countries such as Australia, Great Britain, Belgium, France and Sweden.

The first British annual appeared in 1980. Some albums were released in 1990 on the French market. The titles are separate from the books though they cover the same war or after war investigation operations of Biggles.

=== Postage stamps ===
Biggles featured on a stamp issued by the Royal Mail on 1 February 1994, as part of the sixth issue of its Greetings Stamps series. The set comprised ten first class stamps, each portraying a character from children's literature. Aside from Biggles, the other characters featured were Dan Dare, The Three Bears, Rupert Bear, Alice in Wonderland, Noggin the Nog, Peter Rabbit, Red Riding Hood, Orlando the Marmalade Cat and Paddington Bear.

The stamps were designed by Newell and Sorrell, and the artist for the Biggles stamp was Alan Cracknell. Biggles is wearing a leather flying helmet and goggles, holding an 'air mail' envelope addressed to him, and giving the thumbs up. A biplane, probably a De Havilland Tiger Moth is shown flying in the background.

Also included in the presentation pack were labels containing greetings messages. The two related to Biggles, shown in white text on a blue background, read "Happy Birthday" and "Chocks Away". The Biggles stamp, its associated presentation pack and first day covers were described in the British Philatelic Bulletin of January 1994.

=== Music ===
In Jethro Tull's 1972 album, Thick as a Brick, there is reference to Biggles in the part labelled "Childhood Heroes"; "So where the hell was Biggles, when you needed him last Saturday".

=== In other W. E. Johns books ===
Biggles, or members of his team, have appeared in the following Gimlet books

- King of the Commandos
- Gimlet Goes Again
- Gimlet Mops Up
- Gimlet Bores In

Air Commodore Raymond also appeared in W. E. Johns' "Steeley Books".

== Parodies ==
=== Monty Python's Flying Circus ===
Biggles was parodied in a series of skits on the 1970s British comedy television show, Monty Python's Flying Circus, including one titled "Biggles Dictates a Letter". In the sketch, Biggles (Graham Chapman) behaves in a naive and overreactive manner about the sexual orientation of his comrades, shooting Algy in the process.

Other Monty Python treatments of Biggles include:

- "Cardinal Biggles", complete with flying helmet and goggles, assists in the interrogations in the "Spanish Inquisition sketch".
- Biggles appears as a woman's lover in the sketch "Strangers in the Night" accompanied by Algy.
- Two text stories, "Biggles Is Extremely Silly" and "Biggles and the Naughty Things", are included in The Brand New Monty Python Bok.
- The title of a subsequent episode, "Biggles Flies Undone", was mentioned at the end of "Biggles Dictates a Letter", as if the two "episodes" were part of an ongoing adventure serial.
- In the first Comic Relief (1985), Michael Palin reads the skit "Biggles Goes to See Bruce Springsteen".
- A customer in "The Bookshop Sketch", originally from At Last the 1948 Show and later found on Monty Python's Contractual Obligation Album, requests the fictitious "Biggles Combs his Hair".

=== Other parodies ===
- Biggles Flies a Fokker Home is a 2011 play written by former cricketer James Graham-Brown under the pen name Dougie Blaxland.
