= W. E. Johns =

English writer

William Earl Johns
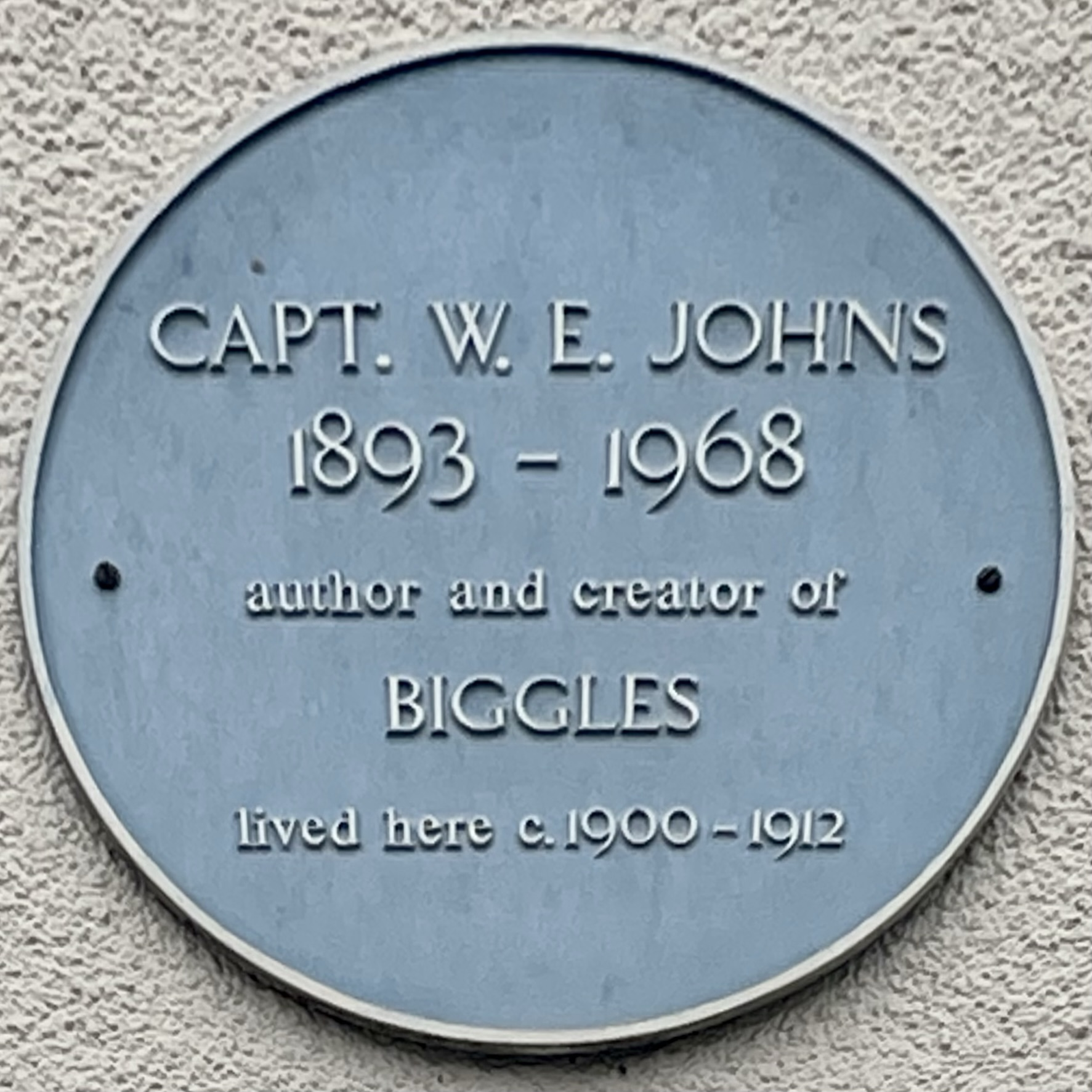
- Born: 5 February 1893; Bengeo, Hertford, United Kingdom
- Died: 21 June 1968 (aged 75); London Borough of Richmond upon Thames, United Kingdom
- Occupations: Aviator, author, editor
- Spouse: Maude Penelope Hunt (m. 1914)
- Partner: Doris May Leigh
- Children: William Earl Carmichael Johns (1916–1954)
- Writing career
- Pen name: Captain W. E. Johns
- Period: 1922–68
- Genres: Adventure fiction, war fiction, science fiction
- Subject: Aviation

William Earl Johns (5 February 1893 – 21 June 1968) was an English First World War pilot and writer of adventure stories, usually written under the pen name Capt. W. E. Johns. He is best known for creating the fictional air adventurer Biggles.

== Early life ==
Johns was born in Bengeo, Hertford, England, the son of Richard Eastman Johns, a fabric tailor, and Elizabeth Johns (née Earl), the daughter of a master butcher. A younger brother, Russell Ernest Johns, was born on 24 October 1895. Johns's early ambition was to be a soldier and he was a crack shot with a rifle. From January 1905 he attended Hertford Grammar School. He also attended evening classes at the local art school.

Johns was not a natural scholar. He included some of his experiences at this school in his book Biggles Goes to School (1951). In the summer of 1907 he was apprenticed to a county municipal surveyor for four years and in 1912 was appointed as a sanitary inspector in Swaffham, in Norfolk. Soon afterwards his father died of tuberculosis at the age of 47.

== Marriage ==
On 6 October 1914 Johns married Maude Penelope Hunt (1882–1961), the daughter of the Rev. John Hunt, vicar of Little Dunham, Norfolk. Their only son, William Earl Carmichael Johns, was born in March 1916. By 1923 he had left his wife.

== Military career and the First World War ==
In 1913, while living in Swaffham and working as a sanitary inspector, Johns enlisted in the Territorial Army as a trooper in the King's Own Royal Regiment (Norfolk Yeomanry). The regiment was mobilised in August 1914 and sent overseas in September 1915, embarking on RMS Olympic. The Norfolk Yeomanry fought (as infantry) at Gallipoli until December, when they were withdrawn to Egypt. In September 1916 Johns transferred to the Machine Gun Corps. While serving on the Macedonian front in Greece he was hospitalised with malaria. After recovering he was commissioned into the Royal Flying Corps (RFC) in September 1917 as a temporary second lieutenant and posted back to England for flight training.

Johns undertook his initial flying training at the short-lived airfield at Coley Park in Reading, flying the Farman MF.11 Shorthorn aircraft. He was then posted to No. 25 Flying Training School at Thetford, in Norfolk, closer to where his wife, Maude, and son, Jack, were living.

On 1 April 1918 Johns was appointed flying instructor at Marske Aerodrome in Yorkshire. The aircraft of the time were very unreliable and he wrote off three planes in three days through engine failure – crashing into the sea, then the sand, and then through a fellow officer's back door. Later he was caught in fog over the Tees, missed Hartlepool and narrowly escaped flying into a cliff. Shooting one's own propeller off with a forward-mounted machine-gun with malfunctioning synchronisation was a fairly common accident and it happened to Johns twice. The commanding officer at Marske was a Major Champion, known as "Gimlet", a name used later by Johns for the hero of a series of stories.

During this time Johns's probationary commission was confirmed. He continued to serve as a flying instructor until August 1918, when he transferred to No. 55 Squadron RAF, at the time part of the Independent Air Force, a section of the Royal Air Force that had been formed for the purpose of bombing targets deep inside Germany. Casualties in the Independent Air Force were high and Johns's career flying strategic bombing missions was characteristically short, lasting only six weeks. On 16 September 1918, he was piloting one of six DH.4s on their way to bomb Mannheim when his aircraft was hit by anti-aircraft fire and he was forced to drop out of formation. He jettisoned his single 250-pound (110 kg) bomb and turned for home, but was attacked by a number of Fokker D.VII fighters. During a lengthy but one-sided battle, Johns's observer and rear-gunner, Second Lieutenant Alfred Edward Amey, was badly wounded and the aircraft shot down. The victory was credited to Georg Weiner, the commander of Jagdstaffel 3. Johns and Amey were taken prisoner by German troops. Johns received a leg wound during the battle and was slightly injured in the crash, but Amey died of his injuries later that day. (Note: Amey's medals were sold at auction in the United Kingdom in 2005, in a lot that included a letter to his family from Johns, describing the circumstances of his death (see: Bosleys 2005, Lot 556). In the preface of Biggles Pioneer Air Fighter (1954), on page vi, Johns wrote: "Lieutenant A. E. Amey, who fought his first and last fight beside me, had not even unpacked his kit!") Johns remained a prisoner of war until after the Armistice of 11 November 1918.

After the war, Johns remained in the Royal Air Force, apparently with the substantive rank of pilot officer. (Note: It was common for officers continuing in the service after the war to take a lower rank than that held during the conflict, but it does seem highly unlikely he had ever held the rank of "captain" in the RFC (equivalent to flight lieutenant in the RAF), even on an "acting" basis.) His promotion to the rank of flying officer was gazetted on 23 November 1920. Johns worked in central London as a recruiting officer and rejected T. E. Lawrence (of Arabia) as an RAF recruit for having applied under the false name of John Hume Ross, but was later ordered to accept him.

By 1923, Johns had left his wife. His RAF commission had been extended a further four years and he had moved to Birmingham, again working as a recruitment officer. In Birmingham he met Doris May "Dol" Leigh (1900–1969), daughter of Alfred Broughton Leigh. They later moved to Newcastle upon Tyne when Johns was posted there. Although Johns never divorced his wife, Doris was known as "Mrs Johns" until her death. Johns continued to pay for his wife and son's upkeep and for her nursing care (she suffered from acute arthritis).

On 15 October 1927, he was transferred to the reserves. Four years later, on 15 October 1931, he relinquished his commission.

== Writing ==
W. E. Johns was a prolific author and editor. In his 46-year writing career (1922–1968) he wrote over 160 books, including nearly one hundred Biggles books, more than sixty other novels and factual books, and scores of magazine articles and short stories.

His first novel, Mossyface, (Note: Mossy Face was a name given by the Allies to Havrincourt Wood: it is mentioned in some of the Biggles stories and in some pilot's memoirs of the period.) was published in 1922 under the pen name "William Earle". After leaving the RAF, Johns became a newspaper air correspondent, as well as editing and illustrating books about flying. At the request of John Hamilton Ltd, he created the magazine Popular Flying which first appeared in March 1932. It was in the pages of Popular Flying that Biggles first appeared.

The first Biggles book, The Camels are Coming (a reference to the Sopwith Camel aeroplane), was published in August 1932 and Johns would continue to write Biggles stories until his death in 1968. At first, the Biggles stories were credited to "William Earle", but later Johns adopted the more familiar "Capt. W. E. Johns". While his apparent final RAF rank of flying officer was equivalent to an army (or RFC) lieutenant, captain is commonly used for the commander of a vessel or aircraft.

Johns was also a regular contributor to The Modern Boy magazine in the late 1930s as well as editing (and writing for) both Popular Flying and Flying. From the early 1930s, Johns called for the training of more pilots, for if there were not enough when war came, "training would have to be rushed, and under-trained airmen would die in accidents or in combat against better trained German pilots". He was removed as editor at the beginning of 1939, probably as a direct result of a scathing editorial, strongly opposed to the policy of appeasement and highly critical of several Conservative statesmen of the time. Cockburn, however, feels that the government was concerned about being so "expertly attacked" on the lack of trained pilots by the editor of the most widely read aviation magazines in the world, including readers "in the RAF or connected with flying". Shortly before being dismissed from the magazine, Johns wrote an editorial for it in March 1939 in which he expressed support for the Spanish Republic. Johns also strongly criticised the Chamberlain government for its policy of non-intervention in the Spanish Civil War.

Johns's opposition to appeasement is reflected in some of his books. For example, in The Black Peril (1935) the storyline revolves around Russian preparations for conquest. Even more advanced in his thinking, for that time, was the story Biggles Air Commodore (1937) which alludes to Japanese preparations for conquest of British colonies in the Far East.

Apart from "Biggles", his other multi-volume fiction series were:

- The 6-volume "Steeley" series (1936–1939), featuring former First World War pilot turned crime-fighter Deeley Montfort Delaroy (nicknamed "Steeley").
- The 11-volume "Worrals" series (1941–1950), detailing the exploits of plucky WAAF Flight Officer Joan "Worrals" Worralson (who was also the subject of three short stories); these were created at the request of the Air Ministry to inspire young women to join the Women's Auxiliary Air Force.
- The 10-volume "Gimlet" series (1943–1954), whose hero is the dashing British commando Captain Lorrington "Gimlet" King.
- A 10-volume science fiction series (1954–1963) that follows the interplanetary adventures of retired RAF Group Captain Timothy "Tiger" Clinton, his son Rex, scientist Professor Lucius Brane (who invents a spaceship powered by cosmic rays) and Brane's resourceful butler Judkins.
  - Kings of Space
  - Return to Mars
  - Now To The Stars
  - To Outer Space
  - The Edge of Beyond
  - The Death Rays of Ardilla
  - To Worlds Unknown
  - The Quest for the Perfect Planet
  - Worlds of Wonder
  - The Man Who Vanished Into Space

Johns also wrote eight other books of juvenile fiction, twelve books of fiction for adults, and eight factual books, including several books on aviation, books on pirates and treasure hunting, and a book on gardening, The Passing Show.

Unusually among children's writers of the time, from 1935 Johns employed a working-class character as an equal member of the Biggles team – "Ginger" Habblethwaite, later Hebblethwaite, the son of a Northumberland miner. However, readers never learn his real given name, and he proclaims himself a Yorkshireman once or twice.

== Residences ==
According to the unofficial blue plaque on the building, he lived in "Thatched Cottage", Lingfield, Surrey, from 1927 to 1937. From 1953 until his death in 1968, Johns lived at Park House, Hampton Court Road, near Hampton Court in Middlesex.

== Death ==
W. E. Johns died on 21 June 1968, aged 75. Shortly before he died he was writing the final Biggles story, entitled Biggles Does Some Homework, which shows Biggles at last preparing to retire, and meeting his replacement. The twelve chapters written were issued privately in 1997.

Johns's body was cremated at Kingston-upon-Thames Crematorium, Bonner Hill Road.

== Biography ==
By Jove, Biggles!, a biography of Johns, was published in 1981, written by Peter Berresford Ellis and Piers Williams. It was republished as Biggles! The Life Story of Capt. W. E. Johns (Veloce Publishing, 1993, ISBN 187410526X).
