= List of English writers (K–Q) =

List of English writers lists writers in English, born or raised in England (or who lived in England for a lengthy period), who already have Wikipedia pages. References for the information here appear on the linked Wikipedia pages. The list is incomplete – please help to expand it by adding Wikipedia page-owning writers who have written extensively in any genre or field, including science and scholarship. Please follow the entry format. A seminal work added to a writer's entry should also have a Wikipedia page. This is a subsidiary to the List of English people. There are or should be similar lists of Irish, Scots, Welsh, Manx, Jersey, and Guernsey writers.

Abbreviations: AV = Authorized King James Version of the Bible, also as = also wrote/writes as, c. = circa, century; cc. = centuries; cleric = Anglican priest, fl. = floruit, RC = Roman Catholic, SF = science fiction, YA = young adult fiction

== K ==
- Carrie Kabak (born 1951), novelist and illustrator
- Sarah Kane (1971–1999), playwright
- Anna Kavan (also as Helen Ferguson, real name Helen Emily Woods, 1901–1968), novelist and painter
- Joanna Kavenna (born 1974), novelist and travel writer
- Sheila Kaye-Smith (1887–1956), novelist
- Judith Kazantzis (1940–2018), poet and anthologist
- Annie Keary (1825–1879), novelist, poet and children's writer
- Jonathan Keates (born 1946), writer and novelist
- John Keats (1795–1821), poet, "Ode to a Nightingale"
- John Keble (1792–1866), poet and cleric
- Maurice Keen (1933–2012), historian
- Ann Kelley (born 1941), children's writer and poet
- Herbert Kelly (1860–1950), religious writer and cleric
- Fanny Kemble (1809–1893), playwright, diarist and actress
- Gene Kemp (1926–2015), children's writer
- Jonathan Kemp (born 1967), novelist
- Margery Kempe (c. 1373 – post–1438), mystic
- Thomas Ken (1637–1711), hymnist and cleric
- May Kendall (real name Emma Goldworth Kendall, 1861 – c. 1943), poet, novelist and satirist
- Tim Kendall (born 1970), poet, editor and critic
- Luke Kennard (born 1982), poet and lecturer
- Lena Kennedy (1914–1986), novelist
- Margaret Kennedy (1896–1967), novelist and playwright
- Ally Kennen (born 1975), children's writer and singer
- White Kennett (1660–1728), antiquary, writer and bishop
- Charles Lamb Kenney (1823–1881), librettist and miscellanist
- James Kenney (1780–1849), playwright
- William Kenrick (c. 1725–1779), satirist and playwright
- Lady Amabel Kerr (1846–1906), biographer, children's writer, novelist
- Judith Kerr (1923–2019), children's writer and screenwriter
- David Kessler (also as Adam Palmer, born 1957), novelist
- R. W. Ketton-Cremer (1906–1969), local historian and biographer
- Sidney Keyes (1922–1943), poet
- John Maynard Keynes (1883–1946), economist
- Vaseem Khan (born 1973), novelist
- Richard Kilby (1560–1620), scholar, AV translator and cleric
- Anne Killigrew (1660–1685), poet
- Henry Killigrew (1613–1700), playwright and cleric
- Thomas Killigrew (1612–1683), playwright
- William Killigrew (1606–1695), playwright and courtier
- Francis Kilvert (1840–1879), diarist and cleric
- Clive King (1924–2018), children's writer
- Daren King (born 1972), novelist and children's writer
- Francis King (1923–2011), novelist and story writer
- Geoffrey King (fl. 1600s), theologian, AV translator and cleric
- Gregory King (1648–1712), statistician and genealogist
- Henry King (1592–1669), poet and bishop
- William King (1663–1712), poet and essayist
- William King (born 1959), novelist
- Desmond King-Hele (1927–2019), writer and physicist
- Dick King-Smith (1922–2011), children's writer
- Alexander William Kinglake (1809–1891), travel writer and historian
- Charles Kingsley (1819–1875), novelist, The Water Babies
- Henry Kingsley (1830–1876), novelist
- Mary Kingsley (1862–1900), ethnographer and explorer
- Peter Kingsley (born 1953), philosopher
- Hugh Kingsmill (1889–1949), novelist, humorist and biographer
- W. H. G. Kingston (1814–1880), children's writer
- Sophie Kinsella (1969–2025), novelist
- Rudyard Kipling (1865–1936), novelist, essayist and poet, The Jungle Book
- Andrew Kippis (1725–1795), writer and Presbyterian minister
- William Kirby (1759–1850), entomologist
- Geoffrey Kirk (1921–2003), classicist
- Francis Kirkman (1632 – c. 1680), writer and bookseller
- James Kirkup (1918–2009), poet, translator and travel writer
- C. H. B. Kitchin (1895–1967), novelist
- Flora Klickmann (1867–1958), journalist, editor and children's writer
- Matthew Kneale (born 1960), novelist, English Passengers
- Nigel Kneale (1922–2006), screenwriter and genre novelist
- Anne Knight (1792–1860), children's writer and educator
- Charles Knight (1791–1873), writer and publisher
- Ellis Cornelia Knight (1757–1837), novelist and painter
- Eric Knight (1897–1943), novelist and children's writer, Lassie Come-Home
- G. Wilson Knight (1897–1985), critic and scholar
- Henry Gally Knight (1786–1846), novelist and architecture writer
- Richard Payne Knight (1750–1824), classicist and connoisseur
- Samuel Knight (1675–1746), biographer, antiquary and cleric
- Stephen Knight (1951–1985), writer
- Stephen Thomas Knight (born 1940), literary historian
- Richard Knolles (c. 1545–1610), historian and translator
- Hanserd Knollys (1599–1691), translator and Baptist minister
- Frederick Knott (1916–2002), playwright and screenwriter
- Ronald Knox (1888–1957), writer, translator and theologian
- Vicesimus Knox (1752–1821), essayist and cleric
- Dorothy Koomson (born 1971), novelist
- Bernard Kops (1926–2024), playwright and novelist
- Michael Korda (born 1933), writer and editor
- Hari Kunzru (born 1969), novelist
- Hanif Kureishi (born 1954), novelist and playwright
- Thomas Kyd (1558–1595), playwright, The Spanish Tragedy
- Francis Kynaston (1587–1642), poet and translator

== L ==
- Ian La Frenais (born 1936), scriptwriter
- Robert Lacey (born 1944), biographer and historian
- James Lackington (1746–1815), memoirist
- Thomas Hailes Lacy (1809–1873), playwright and publisher
- Olivia Laing (born 1977), fiction and non-fiction
- Andrew Lamb (born 1942), writer on music
- Caroline Lamb (1785–1828), novelist
- Charles Lamb (1775–1834), essayist
- Charlotte Lamb (real name Sarah Coates, several pen names, 1937–2000), novelist
- Lynton Lamb (1907–1977), crime writer and illustrator
- Mary Lamb (1764–1847), essayist
- Constant Lambert (1905–1951, England, Mu/D), music critic and librettist
- Derek Lambert (also as Nigel Falkirk, 1929–2001), thriller writer
- Joseph Lancaster (1778–1838), educator
- Osbert Lancaster (1908–1986), writer and cartoonist
- John Lanchester (born 1962), journalist and novelist
- Letitia Elizabeth Landon (wrote as L. E. L., 1802–1838), poet and novelist
- Robert Eyres Landor (1781–1869), playwright, poet and cleric
- Walter Savage Landor (1775–1864), writer and poet
- Edward William Lane (1801–1876), scholar and translator
- Jane Lane (1905–1978), historical novelist and biographer
- Joel Lane (born 1963), novelist, story writer and poet
- John Langhorne (1735–1779), poet and translator
- William Langland (c. 1332 – c. 1386), poet, Piers Plowman
- R. F. Langley (1938–2011), poet
- Peter Langtoft (died c. 1305), chronicler
- Bennet Langton (1736–1801), writer
- Emilia Lanier or Lanyer (1569–1645), poet
- Nathaniel Lardner (1684–1768), theologian
- Philip Larkin (1922–1985), poet
- Michael Laskey (born 1944), poet and editor
- Harold Laski (1893–1950), political writer
- Marghanita Laski (1915–1988), novelist and broadcaster
- David Lassman (born 1963), writer and scriptwriter
- Francis Lathom (1774–1832), novelist and playwright
- Hugh Latimer (c. 1487–1555), preacher, bishop and martyr
- William Laud (1573–1645), theologian, archbishop and martyr
- Hugh Laurie (born 1959), novelist and actor
- William Law (1686–1761), theologian
- D. H. Lawrence (1885–1930), novelist and poet, Sons and Lovers
- George A. Lawrence (1827–1876), novelist
- T. E. Lawrence (1888–1935), writer and soldier, Seven Pillars of Wisdom
- William Lawrence (1783–1867), scientist
- Benjamin Lay (1681–1760), pamphleteer
- Cecil Howard Lay (1885–1956), poet and artist
- Layamon or Laȝamon (early 13th c.), chronicler
- John Layfield (died 1617), scholar, AV translator and cleric
- John le Carré (real name D. J. M. Cornwell, 1931–2020), thriller writer, The Spy Who Came in from the Cold
- Richard Le Gallienne (1866–1947), writer and poet
- William Le Queux (1866–1947), novelist, poet and essayist
- Jane Leade (1624–1704), religious writer
- Mary Leapor (1722–1746), poet
- Edward Lear (1812–1888), poet and artist, "The Owl and the Pussycat"
- James Leasor (1923–2007), novelist and historian
- Stephen Leather (born 1956), novelist
- F. R. Leavis (1895–1978), critic and editor
- Norman Lebrecht (born 1948), music writer
- Francis Nigel Lee (1934–2011), theologian
- Harriet Lee (1757–1851), novelist and playwright
- Laurie Lee (1914–1997), poet and memoirist, Cider with Rosie
- Nathaniel Lee (1653–1692), playwright
- Sidney Lee (1859–1926), biographer and critic
- Sophia Lee (1750–1824), novelist and playwright
- Vernon Lee (real name Violet Paget, 1856–1935), novelist and essayist
- Eugene Lee-Hamilton (1845–1907), poet
- James Lees-Milne (1908–1997), writer and diarist
- Joseph Leftwich (real name Lefkovicz, 1892–1984), poet, translator and anthologist
- John Lehmann (1907–1987), poet and editor
- R. C. Lehmann (1856–1929), writer and lyricist
- Rosamond Lehmann (1901–1990), novelist, autobiographer and translator
- Chandos Leigh (1791–1850), writer and poet
- Dorothy Leigh (died c. 1616), writer on child-raising
- Richard Leigh (1649/1650–1728), poet
- Clare Leighton (1898–1989), writer and illustrator
- John Leland or Leyland (c. 1503/1506–1552), antiquary
- John Leland (1691–1766), writer and Presbyterian minister
- Mark Lemon (1809–1870), playwright, novelist and editor
- John Lemprière (c. 1765–1824), scholar and lexicographer
- Sue Lenier (born 1957), poet and playwright
- Rebecca Lenkiewicz (born 1968), playwright
- John Lennon (1940–1980), singer and songwriter
- Charlotte Lennox (1730–1804), writer and poet
- Alan Leo (real name William Frederick Allan, 1860–1917), astrologer
- Roger L'Estrange (1615–1704), pamphleteer and translator
- Ada Leverson (1862–1933), novelist
- Denise Levertov (1923–1997), poet
- Michael Levey (1927–2008), art historian
- Peter Levi (1931–2000), poet, critic and travel writer
- Bernard Levin (1928–2004), writer and broadcaster
- Amy Levy (1861–1889), poet and novelist
- Andrea Levy (1956–2019), novelist
- Juliette de Baïracli Levy (1912–2009), herbalist
- Tim Lewens (born 1974), philosopher
- George Henry Lewes (1817–1878), philosopher and critic
- Alethea Lewis (wrote as Eugenia De Acton, 1749–1827), novelist
- C. S. Lewis (1898–1963), novelist, children's writer and critic, The Chronicles of Narnia
- David Lewis (1682–1760), poet and playwright
- George Cornewall Lewis (1806–1863), writer, philologist and politician
- Hilda Lewis (1896–1974), novelist and children's writer
- Leopold David Lewis (1828–1890), playwright and translator
- Matthew Lewis (1775–1818), novelist and diarist
- Roger Lewis (born 1960), biographer and scholar
- Ted Lewis (1940–1982), novelist and screenwriter
- Wyndham Lewis (1882–1957), writer and painter
- Marina Lewycka (born 1946), novelist and medical writer
- Anne Ley (c. 1599–1641), writer, teacher, and polemicist
- Peter Leycester (1614–1678), antiquary and historian
- Nell Leyshon (living), dramatist and novelist
- Henry George Liddell (1811–1898), scholar, lexicographer and cleric
- John Lilburne (c. 1614–1657), pamphleteer
- George Lillo (1693–1739), playwright
- Thomas Linacre or Lynaker (c. 1460–1524), physician and translator
- David Lindsay (1876–1945), novelist
- John Lingard (1771–1851), historian and hymnist
- Martin Lings (1909–2005), scholar and poet
- William Linley (1771–1835), writer and musician
- Eliza Lynn Linton (1822–1898), novelist and essayist
- Mary Linwood (1755–1845), novelist and needlewoman
- Suzannah Lipscomb (born 1978), historian and broadcaster
- Anne Lister (1791–1840), diarist and traveller
- S. E. Lister (born 1988), historical novelist
- Thomas Henry Lister (1800–1842), novelist
- Toby Litt (born 1968), novelist and editor
- Emanuel Litvinoff (1915–2011), novelist, poet and autobiographer
- Edward Lively (1545–1605), scholar, AV translator and cleric
- Penelope Lively (born 1933), novelist and children's writer
- Richard Llewellyn (real name Richard Llewellyn Lloyd, 1906–1983), novelist and screenwriter
- Charles Lloyd (1775–1839), poet and translator
- Christopher Lloyd (1921–2006), garden writer
- Robert Lloyd (1733–1764), poet and satirist
- John Locke (1632–1704), philosopher, An Essay Concerning Human Understanding
- William John Locke (1863–1930), novelist and playwright
- Frederick Locker-Lampson (1821–1895), poet
- David Lodge (1935–2025), novelist and critic
- Edmund Lodge (1756–1839), herald and biographer
- Oliver Lodge (1851–1940), physicist and science writer
- Oliver W. F. Lodge (1878–1955), poet and playwright
- Thomas Lodge (c. 1558–1625), playwright and poet
- Tom Lodge (1936–2012), writer and broadcaster
- John Lodwick (1916–1959), novelist
- Hugh Lofting (1886–1947), children's writer and poet, Dr. Dolittle
- Norah Lofts (1904–1983), novelist and biographer
- Christopher Logue (1926–2011), poet and screenwriter
- Herbert Lomas (1924–2011), poet and translator
- Charles Edward Long (1796–1861), antiquary
- George Long (1800–1879), polymath and translator
- Kate Long (born 1964), novelist, The Bad Mother's Handbook
- Elizabeth Longford (1906–2002), biographer
- Roger Longrigg (1939–2000), novelist
- E. C. R. Lorac (real name Edith Caroline Rivett, also as Carol Carnac, 1884–1959), novelist
- Jane C. Loudon (1807–1858), novelist
- Nicholas Love (died c. 1424), translator and prior
- Richard Lovelace (1618–1657), poet
- Henry Lovelich (fl. 15th c.), poet and translator
- Peter Lovesey (1936–2025), crime writer
- William Lovett (1800–1877), writer and Chartist
- Archibald Low (1888–1956), science writer
- Sidney James Mark Low (1857–1932), historian
- Edward Lowbury (1913–2007), poet and bacteriologist
- Marie Adelaide Belloc Lowndes (1868–1947), novelist
- William Thomas Lowndes (c. 1798–1843), bibliographer
- Malcolm Lowry (1909–1957), poet and novelist
- Robert Lowth (1710–1787), poet, bishop and grammarian
- Mina Loy (originally Mina Gertrude Löwry, 1882–1966), poet, playwright and novelist
- John Lubbock (1834–1913), scientist and politician
- Percy Lubbock (1879–1965), essayist and biographer
- E. V. Lucas (1868–1938), essayist
- F. L. Lucas (1894–1967), classicist and poet
- Edward Lucie-Smith (born 1933), writer and poet
- Edmund Ludlow (c. 1617–1692), memoirist
- Jane Lumley, Lady Lumley (1537–1538), translator
- Arnold Lunn (1888–1874), writer and skier
- Henry Luttrell (c. 1765–1851), poet
- Narcissus Luttrell (1657–1732), historian
- Alfred Comyn Lyall (1835–1911), historian and poet
- Gavin Lyall (1932–2003), thriller writer
- John Lydgate (c. 1370 – c. 1451), poet
- Charles Lyell (1797–1875), geologist
- John Lyly (1553/1554–1606), writer and dramatist
- Jonathan Lynn (born 1943), screenwriter and novelist
- Elinor Lyon (1921–2008), children's writer
- P. H. B. Lyon (1893–1986), poet and school headmaster
- George Lyttelton, 1st Baron Lyttelton (1709–1773), politician and poet
- George William Lyttelton (1883–1962), correspondent and educator
- Rosina Bulwer Lytton (1802–1882), novelist and campaigner

== M ==
- James Mabbe (1572–1642), poet and translator
- Richard Mabey (born 1941), nature writer
- Catharine Macaulay (1731–1791), historian
- Rose Macaulay (1881–1958), novelist and biographer
- Thomas Babington Macaulay (1800–1859), historian and poet
- Desmond MacCarthy (1877–1952), critic
- Fiona MacCarthy (1940–2020), biographer and cultural historian
- Philip MacDonald (also as Oliver Fleming, etc., 1900–1980), novelist and screenwriter
- A. G. Macdonell (1895–1941), essayist, England, Their England
- Robert Macfarlane (born 1976), travel writer and critic
- William McFee (1881–1966), novelist and essayist
- Arthur Machen (originally Arthur Llewelyn Jones, 1863–1947), novelist and mystic
- Colin MacInnes (1914–1976), novelist
- Ben Macintyre (born 1963), biographer
- Denis Mackail (1892–1971), novelist
- Compton Mackenzie (1883–1972), novelist, Whisky Galore
- Serena Mackesy (living), novelist
- Mary Mackie (living), novelist and non-fiction writer
- Joseph Macleod (also as Adam Drinan, 1903–1984), poet, playwright and broadcaster
- Barry MacSweeney (1948–2000), poet and journalist
- Falconer Madan (1851–1935), writer and bibliographer
- Judith Madan (born Judith Cowper, 1702–1781), poet
- Martin Madan (1726–1790), writer, translator and cleric
- Charles Madge (1912–1996), poet and sociologist
- Thomas Madox (1666–1727), Historiographer Royal and antiquary
- Bryan Magee (1930–2019), writer and broadcaster
- Magnus Magnusson (1929–2007), broadcaster, scholar and translator
- Michelle Magorian (born 1947), children's writer, Goodnight Mister Tom
- Henry James Sumner Maine (1822–1888), jurist and historian
- Petre Mais (1885–1975), travel writer and educator
- Frederic William Maitland (1850–1906), jurist and historian
- Julia Maitland (1808–1864), writer and traveller
- Sara Maitland (born 1950), novelist and religious writer
- Bathsua Makin (real name Bathsua Reginald, c. 1600 – c. 1675), writer and scholar
- Lucas Malet (real name Mary St. Leger Kingsley, 1852–1931), novelist
- William Hurrell Mallock (1849–1923), novelist, satirist and poet
- Thomas Malory (c. 1430 – c. 1471), author, Le Morte d'Arthur
- Eric Malpass (1910–1996), novelist
- Thomas Robert Malthus (1766–1834), political economist
- Bernard Mandeville (1670–1733), philosopher and satirist
- Richmal Mangnall (1769–1820), schoolbook writer
- Andrew Mango (1926–2014), writer and broadcaster
- H. A. Manhood (1904–1991), short story writer
- Guy Mankowski (born 1983), writer
- Delarivier Manley (1663 or 1670–1724), novelist, playwright and pamphleteer
- Mary E. Mann (1848–1929), novelist and story writer
- George Manners (1778–1853), writer and editor
- Ethel Mannin (1900–1984), novelist, essayist and travel writer
- Anne Manning (1807–1879), novelist
- Olivia Manning (1908–1980), novelist and critic, Fortunes of War
- Sarra Manning, writer and journalist
- Ruth Manning-Sanders (1886–1988), poet and children's writer
- Robert Mannyng (c. 1275 – c. 1338), poet and chronicler, Handlyng Synne
- Henry Longueville Mansel (1820–1871), philosopher
- Katherine Mansfield (1888–1923), story writer and poet, The Garden Party
- Keith Mansfield (born 1965), novelist and screenwriter
- Richard Mant (1776–1848), writer, translator and cleric
- Hilary Mantel (1952–2022), novelist and critic, Wolf Hall
- Thomas Manton (1620–1677), theologian and Puritan minister
- Francis Marbury or Merbury (1555–1611), playwright and cleric
- Jane Marcet (1769–1858), science writer for children
- Edgar J. March (1897–1971) writer of books on working sailing ships
- Bessie Marchant (1862–1941), children's writer
- Jan Mark (originally Janet Marjorie Brisland, 1943–2006), children's writer
- Gervase Markham (c. 1568–1637), poet and writer
- Mrs. Markham (real name Elizabeth Penrose, 1780–1837), children's writer
- Stephen Marley (born 1946), novelist and screenwriter
- Tim Marlow (born 1963), art historian and broadcaster
- Christopher Marlowe (1564–1593), playwright, The Tragical History of Doctor Faustus
- Derek Marlowe (1938–1996), novelist and playwright
- Martin Marprelate (pseudonym, fl. 1588–1590), tractarian
- Ellen Marriage (1865–1946), translator, La Comédie humaine
- Anthony Marriott (1931–2014), playwright and actor
- Florence Marryat (1833–1899), novelist
- Frederick Marryat (wrote as Captain Marryat, 1792–1848), novelist and children's writer, Mr Midshipman Easy
- Adam Mars-Jones (born 1954), novelist and critic
- Philip Marsden (born 1961), travel writer and novelist
- Edward Marsh (1872–1953), polymath and translator
- Edward Garrard Marsh (1783–1862), poet and cleric
- Richard Marsh (real name Richard Bernard Heldemann, 1857–1915), novelist
- Alfred Marshall (1842–1924), economist
- Archibald Marshall (1866–1934), novelist and journalist
- Arthur Marshall (1910–1989), writer and broadcaster
- Christabel Marshall (1871–1960), writer, playwright and suffragist
- Emma Marshall (1830–1899), children's writer
- Sybil Marshall (1913–2005), writer, novelist and educator
- John Marston (1576–1634), poet, playwright and satirist
- John Westland Marston (1819–1890), playwright
- Philip Bourke Marston (1850–1887), poet
- Andrew Martin (born 1962), novelist
- J. P. Martin (1879–1966), children's writer
- William Martin (1767–1810), naturalist and palaeontologist
- Harriet Martineau (1802–1876), sociologist and translator
- James Martineau (1805–1900), philosopher
- Andrew Marvell (1621–1678), poet
- Eleanor Marx (1855–1898), translator and writer
- Theo Marzials (1850–1920), poet and composer
- Eric Maschwitz (1901–1969), writer and lyricist
- John Masefield (1878–1967), Poet Laureate and novelist
- A. E. W. Mason (1865–1948), novelist
- Anita Mason (1942–2020), novelist
- Paul Nicholas Mason (born 1958), novelist and playwright
- Richard Mason (1919–1997), novelist
- William Mason (1724–1797), poet
- Gerald Massey (1828–1907), poet and Egyptologist
- William Nathaniel Massey (1809–1881), writer and politician
- Philip Massinger (1584–1640), playwright
- H. J. Massingham (1888–1952), nature writer and poet
- Harold Massingham (1932–2011), poet
- John Masters (1914–1983), novelist, autobiographer and army officer
- John Mastin (1747–1829), local historian and cleric
- Steve Matchett (born 1962), writer and broadcaster
- Samuel Liddell MacGregor Mathers (1854–1918), occultist and translator
- Ellen Buckingham Mathews (wrote as Helen Mathers, 1853–1920), novelist
- Thomas James Mathias (c. 1754–1835), satirist and translator
- Tobie Matthew (1577–1655), writer and translator
- Aylmer and Louise Maude (1858–1938 and 1855–1939), translators and writers
- Robin Maugham (1916–1981), novelist, playwright and travel writer
- William Somerset Maugham (1874–1965), novelist and writer, The Moon and Sixpence
- Henry Maundrell (1665–1701), travel writer and cleric
- Frederick Denison Maurice (1805–1872), religious writer and socialist
- Thomas Maurice (1754–1824), poet and historian
- William Fordyce Mavor (1758–1837), schoolbook writer
- Simon Mawer (1948–2025), novelist
- Donald Maxwell (1877–1936), travel writer and illustrator
- W. B. Maxwell (1866–1938), novelist
- Thomas May (1595–1650), poet, playwright and translator
- Henry Mayhew (1812–1887), social researcher and playwright, London Labour and the London Poor
- James Mayhew (born 1964), children's writer and illustrator
- Peter Mayle (1939–2018), writer and novelist
- Jasper Mayne (1604–1672), poet and playwright
- William Mayne (1928–2010), children's writer, A Grass Rope
- Margaret Mayo (born 1936), novelist
- F. M. Mayor (1872–1932), novelist and short story writer
- Steve McCaffery (born 1947), poet and scholar
- Maria McCann (born 1956), novelist
- Tom McCarthy (born 1969), novelist and screenwriter
- Geraldine McCaughrean (born 1951), novelist and children's writer
- Derek McCulloch ("Uncle Mac", 1897–1967), children's writer and broadcaster
- Flora McDonnell (born 1963), children's writer
- Ian McEwan (born 1948), novelist and screenwriter
- William McFee (1881–1966), story writer
- James McGee, novelist
- Roger McGough (born 1937), performance poet
- John McGrath (1935–2002), playwright
- Patrick McGrath (born 1950), novelist
- Jon McGregor (born 1976), novelist
- R. J. McGregor (1887–1961), children's novelist and playwright
- Hilary McKay (born 1959), children's writer
- Jamie McKendrick (born 1955), poet
- Ronald Brunlees McKerrow (1872–1940), literary critic and bibliographer
- Andy McNab (born 1959), novelist and soldier
- H. C. McNeile (wrote as Sapper, 1888–1937), novelist, Bulldog Drummond
- Cilla McQueen (born 1949), poet
- J. M. E. McTaggart (1866–1925), philosopher
- G. R. S. Mead (1863–1933), writer and theosopher
- Henry Medwall (c. 1462–1502), playwright
- Thomas Medwin (1788–1869), poet, translator and biographer
- Arthur Mee (1875–1943), writer and educator
- Thomas Meech (1868–1940), writer and journalist
- James Meek (born 1962), novelist
- Mary Meeke (died c. 1816), novelist and translator
- George Melly (1926–2007), writer, critic and musician
- Charlotte Mendelson (born 1972), novelist
- George Meredith (1828–1909), novelist and poet, The Egoist
- Louisa Anne Meredith (1812–1895), poet and novelist
- Francis Meres (1565–1672), anthologist and cleric
- Charles Merivale (1808–1893), historian and cleric
- Herman Merivale (1806–1874), historian
- Herman Charles Merivale (wrote as Felix Dale, 1839–1906), playwright and poet
- John Herman Merivale (1779–1844), man of letters
- Leonard Merrick (1864–1939), novelist
- Robert Merry (1755–1798), poet
- Charlotte Mew (1869–1928), poet
- E. H. W. Meyerstein (1889–1952), man of letters
- Alice Meynell (1847–1922), poet and essayist
- Viola Meynell (1885–1956), poet and novelist
- Nicholas Michell (1807–1880), poet and novelist
- Christopher Middleton (1926–2015), poet, translator and scholar
- Conyers Middleton (1683–1750), biographer and cleric
- Nick Middleton (born 1960), geographer
- Richard Barham Middleton (1882–1911), poet and story writer
- Stanley Middleton (1919–2009), novelist
- Thomas Middleton (1580–1627), playwright and poet, The Revenger's Tragedy
- China Miéville (born 1972), novelist and political writer
- Grace Mildmay (c. 1552–1620), diarist
- Susan Miles (real name Ursula Wyllie Roberts, 1887–1975), novelist and poet
- John Stuart Mill (1806–1873), philosopher
- John Guille Millais (1865–1931), naturalist and travel writer
- Andrew Miller (born 1960), novelist
- James Miller (1703–1744), playwright, poet and cleric
- Jonathan Miller (1934–2019), writer and director
- Russell Miller (born 1938), biographer
- Thomas Miller (1807–1874), novelist and poet
- Robert Millhouse (1788–1839), poet
- Spike Milligan (1918–2002), humorist
- Arthur F. H. Mills (1887–1955), novelist
- Dorothy Mills (1896–1959), novelist and travel writer
- George Mills (1896–1972), children's writer
- Magnus Mills (born 1954), novelist
- Mark Mills (living), novelist and screenwriter
- Henry Hart Milman (1791–1868), playwright, poet and cleric
- A. A. Milne (1882–1956), novelist and playwright, Winnie-the-Pooh
- Drew Milne (born 1964), poet and scholar
- John Milner (1628–1702), writer and cleric
- John Milner (1752–1826), writer and RC bishop
- Marion Milner (1900–1998), diarist and psychoanalyst
- Richard Monckton Milnes, Lord Houghton (1809–1885), poet and politician
- Giles Milton (born 1966), historian
- John Milton (1608–1674), poet and theologian, Paradise Lost
- Ted Milton (born 1943), poet and musician
- Richard Milward (born 1984), novelist
- Anthony Minghella (1954–2008), playwright and screenwriter
- Laurence Minot (c. 1300 – c. 1352), poet
- Hope Mirrlees (1887–1978), novelist, translator and poet
- Adrian Mitchell (1932–2008), poet, playwright and novelist
- Basil Mitchell (1917–2011), philosopher
- David Mitchell (born 1969), novelist
- Dreda Say Mitchell (born 1965), novelist, broadcaster and journalist
- Gladys Mitchell (wrote as Stephen Hockaby and Malcolm Torrie, 1901–1983), novelist
- Julian Mitchell (born 1935), playwright and screenwriter
- Bertram Mitford, Lord Redesdale (1837–1916), writer and diplomat
- Bertram Mitford (1855–1914), novelist
- John Mitford (1782–1831), poet and naval officer
- Mary Russell Mitford (wrote as Miss Mitford, 1787–1855), essayist, novelist and playwright, Our Village
- Nancy Mitford (1904–1973), novelist and writer, Noblesse Oblige
- William Mitford (1744–1827), historian
- Timothy Mo (born 1950), novelist
- Ivan Moffat (1918–2002), screenwriter
- Deborah Moggach (born 1948), novelist and screenwriter
- Lottie Moggach, journalist and author
- George Mogridge (1787–1854), poet, children's writer and tractarian
- Caroline Moir (living, England, novelist and playwright)
- John Mole (born 1941), poet
- Mary Louisa Molesworth (also as Ennis Graham, 1839–1921), children's writer
- Mary Mollineux (1651–1696), poet
- Frances Molloy (1947–1991), novelist
- Rowland Molony (born 1946), poet and writer
- Nicola Monaghan (living), novelist
- William Thomas Moncrieff (1794–1857), playwright
- Francis Money-Coutts (wrote as Mountjoy, 1852–1923), poet
- Geraldine Monk (born 1952), poet
- William Cosmo Monkhouse (1840–1901), poet and critic
- Harold Monro (1879–1932), poet
- Jack Monroe (born 1988), food writer
- Nicholas Monsarrat (1910–1979), novelist
- Basil Montagu (1770–1851), miscellanist
- Charles Montagu, earl of Halifax (1661–1715), poet and statesman
- Elizabeth Montagu (1718–1800), writer and bluestocking
- Lady Mary Wortley Montagu (1689–1762), correspondent and poet
- Charles Edward Montague (1867–1928), novelist and essayist
- Simon Sebag Montefiore (born 1965), writer and historian
- Florence Montgomery (1843–1923), novelist and children's writer
- James Montgomery (1771–1854), poet and editor
- Robert Montgomery (1807–1855), poet and cleric
- Colin Moon (born 1957), author and public speaker
- Edward Moor (1771–1848), writer and soldier
- Michael Moorcock (born 1939), novelist
- Alan Moore (born 1953), graphic novelist
- Edward Moore (1712–1757), playwright
- Edward Moore (1835–1916), classicist
- Francis Moore (1657–1715, astrologer and physician
- G. E. Moore (1873–1958), philosopher
- Jonas Moore (1617–1679), mathematician
- Nicholas Moore (1918–1986), poet
- Olive Moore (real name Constance Vaughan, 1905 – c. 1970), novelist and essayist
- Thomas Sturge Moore (1870–1944), poet and playwright
- Tim Moore (born 1964), travel writer
- Geoffrey Moorhouse (1931–2009), writer
- Roger Moorhouse (born 1968), historian
- Henrietta Moraes (1931–1999), writer and model
- Caitlin Moran (born 1975), music journalist and novelist
- Philip Morant (1700–1770), historian and cleric
- Elinor Mordaunt (1872–1942), fiction and non-fiction writer
- Thomas Osbert Mordaunt (1730–1809), poet and army officer
- Gertrude More (1606–1633), religious writer and Benedictine nun
- Hannah More (1745–1833), poet and religious writer
- Henry More (1614–1687), philosopher and poet
- Thomas More (1478–1535), scholar, Utopia
- E. D. Morel (1873–1924), writer on colonialism
- Thomas Morell (1703–1784), librettist
- Charles Langbridge Morgan (1894–1958), novelist, playwright and poet
- Nicola Morgan (born 1961), novelist and non-fiction writer
- Peter Morgan (born 1963), screenwriter and playwright
- Richard K. Morgan (born 1965), novelists and short story writer
- Thomas Charles Morgan (1783–1843), physician and philosopher
- William De Morgan (1839–1917), novelist and ceramicist
- James Justinian Morier (1780–1849), novelist and travel writer
- Stanley Morison (1889–1967), writer and typographer
- Samuel Morland or Moreland (1625–1695), polymath
- David Morley (born 1964), poet and critic
- Henry Morley (1822–1894), critic and biographer
- Iris Morley (1910–1953), novelist and journalist
- John Morley (1838–1923), biographer, writer and politician
- Sheridan Morley (1941–2007), biographer, critic and broadcaster
- Michael Morpurgo (born 1943), children's writer, poet and playwright
- Clare Morrall (born 1952), novelist
- Desmond Morris (1928–2026), ethologist, zoologist and non-fiction writer
- Ivan Morris (1925–1976), writer, scholar and translator
- Jan Morris (originally James Morris, 1926–2020), travel writer
- William Morris (1834–1896), writer, artist and poet
- Arthur Morrison (1863–1945), novelist and journalist
- Blake Morrison (born 1950), poet, novelist and critic
- Graham Mort (living), poet and story writer
- Chapman Mortimer (1907–1988), novelist and screenwriter
- Ian Mortimer (born 1967), historian
- John Mortimer (1923–2009), novelist, playwright and lawyer, Horace Rumpole
- Penelope Mortimer (1918–1999), novelist, biographer and critic
- J. B. Morton (wrote as Beachcomber, 1893–1979), columnist
- John Maddison Morton (1811–1891), playwright
- Thomas Morton (1764–1838), playwright
- Joseph Moser (1748–1819), writer and artist
- Brian Moses (born 1950), poet and children's writer
- Nicholas Mosley (1923–2017), novelist
- Geoffrey Moss (1885–1954), novelist and soldier
- Thomas Moss (1740–1808), poet and cleric
- W. Stanley Moss (1919–1965), novelist, writer and army officer
- James Mossman (1926–1971), writer and broadcaster
- Andrew Motion (born 1952), Poet Laureate
- Peter Anthony Motteux (originally Pierre Antoine, 1663–1718), poet, playwright and translator
- Eric Mottram (1924–1995), poet and editor
- Ralph Hale Mottram (1883–1971), novelist and poet
- Martha Moulsworth (1577–1646), autobiographical poet
- John Moultrie (1799–1874), poet and cleric
- Ferdinand Mount (born 1939), novelist
- Edward Moxon (1801–1858), poet
- Jojo Moyes (born 1969), romantic novelist
- Fiona Mozley (born 1988), novelist
- James Bowling Mozley (1813–1878), writer and cleric
- Thomas Mozley (1806–1893), writer and cleric
- Henry Muddiman (1628–1692), journalist and publisher
- William Mudford (1782–1848), essayist, novelist and translator
- Malcolm Muggeridge (1903–1990), writer and broadcaster
- Lodowicke Muggleton (1609–1698), writer
- Richard Mulcaster (c. 1531–1611), educator
- Clara Mulholland (1849–1934), novelist, playwright, children's writer and translator
- Clare Mulley (born 1969), biographer and activist
- A. J. Munby (1828–1910), diarist and poet
- A. N. L. Munby (1913–1974), ghost-story writer
- Anthony Munday (c. 1560–1633), playwright, poet and translator
- Talbot Mundy (also as Walter Galt, 1879–1940), novelist
- Iris Murdoch (1919–1999), novelist
- Jill Murphy (1949–2021), children's writer
- Margaret Murphy (born 1959), novelist
- Naeem Murr (born 1965), novelist
- Gilbert Murray (1866–1957), scholar
- John Murray (born 1950), novelist
- John Middleton Murry (1889–1957), writer and critic
- Valerie Grosvenor Myer (1935–2007), novelist, poet and critic
- Ernest Myers (1844–1921), poet and translator
- Frederic W. H. Myers (1843–1901), poet and essayist
- Leo Myers (1881–1944), novelist
- Julie Myerson (born 1960), novelist and journalist

== N ==
- Thomas Nabbes (1605–1641), playwright
- Constance Naden (1858–1889), poet and philosopher
- Daljit Nagra (born 1966), poet
- V. S. Naipaul (1932–2018), novelist and Nobel Prize winner
- Priscilla Napier (1908–1998), biographer, translator and poet
- Edward Nares (1762–1841), theologian, novelist and cleric
- Roger Nash (born 1942), philosopher and poet
- Thomas Nashe (1567–1601), poet and pamphleteer
- Bill Naughton (1910–1992), playwright
- John Neal (1793–1876), novelist, essayist and poet
- John Mason Neale (1818–1866), hymnist, cleric and translator
- Patrick Neate (born 1970), novelist and screenwriter
- Mary Anna Needell (1830–1922), novelist
- Violet Needham (1876–1967), children's writer
- Henry Neele (1798–1928), poet and critic
- Malcolm Neesam (1946–2022), historian of Harrogate, North Yorkshire
- Graham Nelson (born 1968), poet and mathematician
- Robert Nelson (1656–1715), religious writer
- E. Nesbit (1858–1924), children's writer and poet, The Railway Children
- Henry Nettleship (1839–1893), classicist
- Lord William Beauchamp Nevill (1860–1939), convict-autobiographer, and prison reformer
- Alexander Neville (1544–1614), historian and translator
- Linda Newbery (born 1952), novelist and children's writer
- Henry Newbolt (1862–1938), poet
- P. H. Newby (1918–1997), novelist
- Bernard Newman (1897–1968), novelist and propagandist
- John Henry Newman (1801–1890), writer and cardinal
- Isaac Newton (1642–1727), polymath
- John Newton (1725–1807), hymnist and pamphleteer
- Thomas Newton (c. 1542–1607), poet and translator
- William Newton (1750–1830), poet
- Charles Nicholl (living), biographer
- David Nicholls (born 1966), novelist and screenwriter
- Sally Nicholls (born 1983), children's writer
- Beverley Nichols (1898–1983), novelist, playwright and garden writer
- Bowyer Nichols (1859–1939), poet
- John Nichols (1745–1826), antiquary
- Peter Nichols (1927–2019), playwright and screenwriter
- Robert Nichols (1893–1944), poet and playwright
- Geoff Nicholson (1953–2025), novelist and editor
- Joseph Shield Nicholson (1850–1927), economist and novelist
- Norman Nicholson (1914–1987), poet
- Renton Nicholson (1809–1861), writer
- William Nicholson (1872–1949), children's writer and illustrator
- William Nicholson (born 1948), novelist, screenwriter and playwright
- Adam Nicolson (born 1957), historian and nature writer
- Harold Nicolson (1886–1968), writer, diarist and politician
- Nigel Nicolson (1917–2004), writer and publisher
- O. S. Nock (1905–1994), railway writer
- Roden Noel (1834–1894), poet
- David Nokes (1948–2009), biographer and screenwriter
- Malcolm Nokes (1897–1986), science and educator
- Jeff Noon (born 1957), novelist and playwright
- Denis Norden (1922–2018), scriptwriter and broadcaster
- Lawrence Norfolk (born 1963), novelist
- Barry Norman (1933–2017), novelist and broadcaster
- Roger Norman (born 1948), children's and YA writer
- John Norris (1657–1711), philosopher and poet
- William Edward Norris (1847–1925), novelist
- Dudley North, Lord North (1602–1677), writer and poet
- Roger North (1653–1734), lawyer and biographer
- Thomas North (1535–1604), translator
- James Northcote (1746–1831), essayist and illustrator
- Caroline Norton (1808–1877), novelist, pamphleteer and poet
- Mary Norton (1903–1992), children's writer
- Thomas Norton (1532–1584), poet and lawyer
- Richard Norton-Taylor (born 1944), playwright and journalist
- John Julius Norwich (originally John Julius Cooper, 1929–2018), historian and travel writer
- Julian of Norwich (1342 – c. 1416), mystic
- Alexander Nowell (1507–1602), writer and cleric
- Alfred Noyes (1880–1958), poet
- Anthony Nuttall (1937–2007), critic and scholar
- Geoffrey Nuttall (1911–2007), church historian and Congregational minister
- Jeff Nuttall (1933–2004), poet and performer
- Robert Nye (1939–2016), poet, novelist and editor
- John Nyren (1764–1837), cricket writer

== O ==
- Ann Oakley (born 1944), novelist and sociologist
- Graham Oakley (1929–2022), children's writer
- John Oakman (c. 1748–1793), writer and engraver
- Patrick O'Brian (originally Richard Patrick Russ, 1914–2000), novelist
- Sean O'Brien (born 1952), poet, playwright and editor
- Thomas Occleve or Hoccleve (c. 1368–1426), poet
- William Ockham or Occam (c. 1288 – c. 1348), philosopher, Occam's Razor
- Sarah Ockwell-Smith (born c. 1976), parent and child-care author
- Philip O'Connor (1916–1998), writer and poet
- Leo Ognall (1908–1979), crime novelist (pen names Harry Carmichael and Hartley Howard)
- John Oldham (1653–1683), poet
- John Oldmixon (1673–1742), historian and pamphleteer
- William Oldys (1696–1761), antiquary
- Laurence Oliphant (1829–1888), writer and traveller
- F. S. Oliver (1864–1934), political writer
- Jamie Oliver (born 1975), cookery writer and chef
- Martin Oliver (living), children's writer
- Michael Oliver (1937–2002), writer and broadcaster
- Paul Oliver (1927–2017), arts writer
- Reggie Oliver (born 1952), story writer and playwright
- Richard Ollard (1923–2007), historian and biographer
- Alfred Ollivant (1874–1927), children's writer
- Daniel O'Mahony (born 1973), novelist and writer
- Carola Oman (1897–1978), biographer, novelist and children's writer
- Charles Oman (1860–1946), historian
- Michael O'Neill (1953–2018), poet and scholar
- Oliver Onions (1873–1961), novelist
- Onyeka (real name Onyeka Nubia, living), writer and playwright
- Amelia Opie (1769–1853), novelist and poet
- Iona Opie (1923–2017), and Peter Opie (1918–1982), ethnographers
- E. Phillips Oppenheim (wrote as Anthony Partridge, 1866–1946), novelist
- Emma Orczy (Baroness Orczy, 1865–1947), novelist and playwright, The Scarlet Pimpernel
- Orderic Vitalis (1075 – c. 1142), chronicler
- George Ormerod (1785–1873), antiquary and historian
- Joe Orton (1933–1967), playwright
- George Orwell (real name Eric Blair) (1903–1950), novelist and essayist, 1984
- Martin Orwin (born 1963), poet and writer
- Dorothy Osborne (1627–1695), correspondent
- John Osborne (1929–1994), playwright, Look Back in Anger
- Robin Osborne (born 1957), classicist and historian
- Alice Oseman (born 1996), YA author
- Arthur O'Shaughnessy (1844–1881), poet
- Maggie O'Sullivan (born 1951), poet and performer
- Alice Oswald (born 1966), poet
- Peter Oswald (born 1965), playwright
- William Young Ottley (1771–1836), art historian
- Thomas Otway (1652–1685), playwright
- Ouida (real name Maria Louise Ramé, 1839–1908), novelist
- William Oughtred (1574–1660), mathematician
- Keith Ovenden (1943–2023), novelist and biographer
- John Overall (1559–1619), scholar, AV translator and bishop
- Thomas Overbury (1581–1613), poet and essayist
- Richard Overton (c. 1599–1664), pamphleteer
- John Owen (1616–1683), theologian
- Richard Owen (1804–1892), scientist
- Wilfred Owen (1893–1918), poet
- Elsie J. Oxenham (real name Elsie Jeanette Dunkerley, 1880–1960), children's writer
- John Oxenham (real name William Arthur Dunkerley, 1852–1941), novelist and poet
- Mary Oxlie (fl. 1616), poet
- Helen Oyeyemi (born 1984), novelist and playwright

== P ==
- Ruth Padel (born 1946), poet and journalist
- Lynda Page (c. 1950–2024), novelist
- Russell Page (1906–1985), garden writer and designer
- John Paget (died 1638), writer and Presbyterian minister
- Barry Pain (1864–1928), novelist and humorist
- Thomas Paine (1737–1809), political pamphleteer, Rights of Man
- William Painter (c. 1540–1594), writer
- William Paley (1743–1805), philosopher, theologian and cleric
- Francis Palgrave (1788–1861), historian
- Francis Turner Palgrave (1824–1897), poet and anthologist
- William Gifford Palgrave (1826–1888), travel writer and orientalist
- Alan Palmer (1926–2022), historian and biographer
- Charlotte Palmer (c. 1762 – 1834 or after), novelist
- Edward Henry Palmer (1840–1882), translator and orientalist
- Herbert Edward Palmer (1880–1961), poet and critic
- John Palmer (c. 1729–1790), writer and Unitarian minister
- John Palmer (1742–1786), writer and Unitarian minister
- Samuel Palmer (1805–1881), poet and painter
- Robert Paltock (1697–1767), novelist
- Jane Ellen Panton (1847–1923), novelist and domestic science writer
- Joseph Pardo (c. 1624 – 1677), writer and hazzan
- Julia Pardoe (1806–1862), poet, novelist and travel writer
- Bernard Pares (1867–1949), historian and Russian expert
- Edith Pargeter (also as Ellis Peters, 1913–1995), novelist and historian
- Emma Parker (fl. 1809–1817), novelist
- Henry Parker (1604–1652), political writer
- Martin Parker (c. 1600 – c. 1656), balladeer
- Matthew Parker (1504–1575), Bible translator and archbishop, Bishops' Bible
- Norman Parker (born 1954), memoirist
- Samuel Parker (1640–1688), theologian and bishop
- Samuel Parker (1681–1730), religious writer and translator
- Una-Mary Parker (1930–2019), novelist and journalist
- Bessie Rayner Parkes (1829–1925), writer and poet
- C. Northcote Parkinson (1909–1993), naval historian and writer on administration, Parkinson's Law
- John Parkinson (1567–1650), herbalist
- Adele Parks (born 1969), novelist
- Tim Parks (born 1954), novelist and translator
- David Parlett (born 1939), games writer
- Samuel Parr (1747–1825), political writer, scholar and educator
- Cecil Parrott (1909–1984), translator and biographer
- Eliza Parsons (1739–1811), novelist
- Frances Partridge (1900–2004), diarist and translator
- John Pass (born 1947), poet and scholar
- Paston Family (14th – 16th cc.), Paston Letters
- Mrs Henry de la Pasture (1866–1945), novelist, dramatist and children's writer
- Walter Pater (1839–1894), essayist and novelist
- Coventry Patmore (1823–1896), poet and critic
- Simon Patrick (1626–1707), theologian and bishop
- Diana Patrick (1878–1964), novelist and poet
- Brian Patten (born 1946), poet and children's writer
- Mark Pattison (1813–1884), writer and cleric
- Phyllis Paul (1903–1973), writer of supernatural fiction
- Tom Paulin (born 1949), poet, academic and broadcaster
- Michelle Paver (born 1960), children's writer
- Stel Pavlou (born 1970), novelist and screenwriter
- James Payn (1830–1898), novelist and miscellanist
- John Payne (1842–1917), poet and translator
- Nick Payne (born 1984), playwright
- David Peace (born 1967), novelist
- Henry Peacham the Elder (1546–1634), rhetorician and cleric
- Henry Peacham the Younger (c. 1573 – c. 1643), poet and critic
- Lucy Peacock (fl. 1785–1816), children's writer, editor and translator
- Thomas Love Peacock (1785–1866), novelist and poet, Nightmare Abbey
- Mervyn Peake (1911–1968), novelist and poet, Gormenghast
- Philippa Pearce (1920–2006), children's writer, Tom's Midnight Garden
- Pearl Poet (unnamed, fl. 14th c.), poet, Sir Gawain and the Green Knight
- Hugh Pearman (born 1955), critic and architect
- Tim Pears (born 1956), novelist
- Dan Pearson (born 1964), garden writer
- Hesketh Pearson (1887–1964), biographer
- John Pearson (1612–1686), theologian and bishop
- John Pearson (1930–2021), biographer
- Edward R. Pease (1857–1955), writer and politician
- Reginald Pecock (c. 1395–1460), theologian and bishop
- Margaret Pedler (died 1948), novelist
- Arthur George Villiers Peel (also as George Peel, 1869–1956), economist and politician
- Constance Peel (also as Mrs. C. S. Peel and Dorothy Peel, 1868–1934), novelist and writer on household economy
- J. H. B. Peel (1913–1983), writer, poet and journalist
- George Peele (1556–1596), playwright and poet, The Old Wives' Tale
- Mal Peet (1947–2015), children's writer
- Samuel Pegge (1704–1796), antiquary, translator and cleric
- Isaac Penington (1616–1679), Quaker writer
- William Penn (1644–1718), politician, writer and Quaker
- Thomas Pennant (1726–1798), naturalist, antiquary and travel writer
- Michael Pennington (1943–2026), actor, director and writer
- Laurie Penny (born 1986), political journalist and novelist
- Francis Penrose (1817–1903), architect and archaeologist
- Roland Penrose (1900–1984), biographer and artist
- Hilary Pepler (1878–1951), writer and poet
- Michael Peppiatt (born 1941), art critic and biographer
- Emily Pepys (1833–1877), child diarist
- Samuel Pepys (1633–1703), diarist and administrator
- Thomas Percy (1729–1811), bishop, poet and anthologist, Percy's Reliques
- John Perrin (c. 1558–1615), scholar, AV translator and cleric
- Anne Perry (1938–2023), novelist
- Chris Petit (born 1949), novelist and film director
- William Petty (1623–1687), economist and philosopher
- K.M. Peyton (originally Kathleen Herald, 1929–2023), children's writer
- Gilbert Phelps (1915–1993), novelist, critic and educator
- St. John Philby (1885–1960), writer and intelligence officer
- Ambrose Philips (1674–1739), poet
- John Philips (1676–1709), poet
- Katherine Philips (1632–1644), poet
- Caryl Phillips (born 1958), novelist
- Edward Phillips (1630 – c. 1696), writer and philologist
- J. B. Phillips (1906–1982), Bible translator and cleric
- John Phillips (1631–1706), writer
- Richard Phillips (1767–1840), writer and publisher
- Stephen Phillips (1864–1915), poet and playwright
- Eden Phillpotts (1862–1960), novelist, poet and playwright
- Henry Phillpotts (1778–1869), pamphleteer and bishop
- Gervase Phinn (born 1946), novelist, poet and educator
- Constantine Phipps (1797–1863), writer and politician
- David Andrew Phoenix (born 1966), writer, scientist and educator
- Barbara Leonie Picard (1917–2011), children's writer
- Tom Pickard (born 1946), poet and scriptwriter
- David Pickering (born 1958), compiler of reference books
- Marmaduke Pickthall (1875–1936), scholar, Qur'an translator and novelist
- Sarah Piers (died 1719), poet
- Arthur Cecil Pigou (1877–1959), economist
- William Thomas Pike (1838–1924), publisher, journalist, editor, writer
- Mary Pilkington (1766–1839), novelist, poet and children's writer
- Arthur Wing Pinero (1855–1934), playwright
- William Pinnock (1782–1843), educator
- Harold Pinter (1930–2008), Nobel prize winner, playwright and screenwriter, The Caretaker
- Isaac Pitman (1813–1897), writer on shorthand
- Christopher Pitt (1699–1748), poet and translator
- William Pitt (died 1840), shipbuilder and poet
- Ruth Pitter (1897–1992), poet
- Mary Pix (1666–1709), playwright and novelist
- James Planché (1796–1880), playwright
- Victor Plarr (1863–1929), poet and biographer
- Alan Plater (1935–2010), playwright, screenwriter and novelist
- Karen Platt (living), garden writer
- Robert Plot (1640–1996), naturalist, chemist and antiquary
- Max Plowman (1883–1941), writer and poet
- J. H. Plumb (1911–2001), historian
- Anne Plumptre (1760–1818), writer and translator
- Isaac Pocock (1782–1835), playwright and painter
- Tom Pocock (1925–2007), biographer and historian
- Richard Pococke (1704–1765), travel writer, diarist and bishop
- Frank Podmore (1856–1910), writer and politician
- Michael Podro (1931–2008), art historian
- Elizabeth Polack (fl. 1830–1838), playwright
- John William Polidori (1795–1821), writer and poet
- Alfred Oliver Pollard (1893–1960), novelist and army officer
- Alfred W. Pollard (1859–1944), bibliographer and scholar
- Margaret Steuart Pollard (1903–1996), poet and writer
- William Pollard (1828–1893), Quaker writer
- Jacob Polley (born 1975), poet and novelist
- Elizabeth Polwheele or Polewhele (c. 1651 – c. 1691), playwright
- Richard Polwhele (1760–1838), poet, writer and cleric
- John Pomfret (1667–1702), poet and cleric
- George Ayliffe Poole (1809–1883), religious writer and cleric
- John Poole (1786–1872), playwright
- Alexander Pope (1688–1744), poet
- Dudley Pope (1925–1997), novelist
- Jessie Pope (1868–1941), poet and writer
- Walter Pope (1627–1714), astronomer and poet
- James Pope-Hennessy (1916–1974), biographer and travel writer
- Samuel Pordage (1633–1691), poet
- Eleanor Anne Porden (1795–1825), poet
- Richard Porson (1759–1808), classicist
- Alice Hobbins Porter (1854–1926), writer, journalist, editor
- Anna Maria Porter (1780–1832), novelist and poet
- Henry Porter (died 1599), playwright
- Henry Porter (born 1953), novelist and journalist
- Jane Porter (1776–1850), novelist
- Linda Porter (born 1947), historian and biographer
- Robert Percival Porter (1852–1917), journalist, statistician, economics writer
- Roy Porter (1946–2002), historian
- Sheena Porter (born 1935), children's writer
- Suzanne Portnoy (born 1961), writer and playwright
- Jacob Post (1774–1855), Quaker writer
- Raymond Postgate (1896–1971), novelist and social historian
- Beatrix Potter (1866–1943), children's writer and illustrator, The Tale of Peter Rabbit
- Dennis Potter (1935–1994), playwright and screenwriter
- Robert Potter (1721–1804), translator, poet and cleric
- Anthony Powell (1905–2000), novelist
- Michael Powell (1905–1990), writer and film director
- Eileen Power (1889–1940), historian
- Marguerite Agnes Power (1815–1867), novelist and periodical writer
- Rhoda Power (1890–1957), children's writer and broadcaster
- John Cowper Powys (1872–1963), novelist
- Llewelyn Powys (1884–1939), travel writer and biographer
- T. F. Powys (1875–1953), novelist and story writer
- Winthrop Mackworth Praed (1802–1839), poet and politician
- Terry Pratchett (1948–2015), novelist
- Anne Pratt (1806–1893), botanical writer and illustrator
- Samuel Jackson Pratt (1749–1814), poet, playwright and novelist
- Lucy Prebble (born 1981), playwright
- Thomas Preston (1537–1598), scholar and playwright
- Thomas Preston (1563–1640), writer and monk
- Anthony Price (1928–2019), thriller writer
- Bonamy Price (1807–1888), political economist
- Nancy Price (1880–1970), playwright, novelist and poet
- Nicholas A. Price, writer, poet, photographer and visual artist
- Richard Price (1723–1791), economist, philosopher and Unitarian minister
- Susan Price (born 1955), children's writer
- Uvedale Price (1747–1829), art critic
- Christopher Priest (1943–2024), novelist
- Chris Priestley (born 1958), children's writer and illustrator
- J. B. Priestley (1894–1984), playwright and novelist
- Joseph Priestley (1733–1804), theologian and philosopher
- Diana Primrose (fl. 1630), poet
- Alison Prince (1931–2019), children's writer, biographer and screenwriter
- Peter Prince (born 1942), novelist and screenwriter
- Matthew Prior (1664–1721), poet
- John Laurence Pritchard (1885–1968), mathematician, and novelist
- V. S. Pritchett (1900–1997), writer
- May Probyn (1856–1909), poet
- Adelaide Anne Procter (1825–1864), poet
- Bryan Procter (wrote as Barry Cornwall, 1787–1874), songwriter and playwright
- Sophie Amelia Prosser (1807–1882), children's writer
- Sally Prue (living), children's writer
- Paula Pryke (born 1960), writer and florist
- J. H. Prynne (1936–2026), poet
- William Prynne (1600–1699), religious writer and historian
- John Pudney (1909–1977), writer and poet
- Sheenagh Pugh (born 1950), poet and novelist
- Charlotte Pullein-Thompson (wrote as Charlotte Popescu, born 1957), children's and garden writer
- Christine Pullein-Thompson (1925–2005), children's writer
- Diana Pullein-Thompson (1925–2015), children's writer
- Josephine Pullein-Thompson (1924–2014), children's writer
- Philip Pullman (born 1946), children's writer, His Dark Materials
- Samuel Purchas (c. 1575–1626), travel writer
- C. B. Purdom (1883–1965), critic and biographer
- Libby Purves (born 1950), novelist, broadcaster and columnist
- Edward Bouverie Pusey (1800–1882), theologian, scholar and cleric
- George Puttenham (1529–1590), and Richard Puttenham (c. 1520 – c. 1601), critics and courtiers
- Henry James Pye (1745–1813), Poet Laureate and writer
- Thomas Pyle (1674–1756), writer and cleric
- Barbara Pym (1913–1980), novelist

== Q ==
- Bernard Quaritch (1819–1899), bookseller and bibliographer
- Francis Quarles (1592–1644), poet
- C. H. B. Quennell (1872–1935), writer and architect
- Marjorie Quennell (1884–1972), historian
- Peter Quennell (1905–1993), biographer, poet and essayist
- Arthur Quiller-Couch (wrote as Q, 1863–1944), novelist and critic, Oxford Book of English Verse, 1250–1900
- Mabel Quiller-Couch (c. 1866–1924), children's writer and editor
- Edward Quillinan (1791–1851), poet and translator
- Janet Quin-Harkin (born 1941), novelist
- Ann Quin (1936–1973), novelist
- Anthony Quiney (born 1935), architectural historian
- Anthony Quinton (1925–2010), philosopher and broadcaster

== See also ==
- English literature
- English novel
- List of children's literature authors
- List of children's non-fiction writers
- List of English-language poets
- List of English novelists
- Lists of writers
