= William Pitts =

William Pitts may refer to:

- William Pitts II (1790–1840), English silver-chaser and sculptor
- William S. Pitts (1830–1918), American physician and composer

== See also ==
- William Pitt (disambiguation)
