= William Pitt =

William Pitt most commonly refers to:

- William Pitt, 1st Earl of Chatham (1708–1778), a.k.a. William Pitt the Elder, British prime minister (1766–1768)
- William Pitt the Younger (1759–1806), son of the above and British prime minister (1783–1801, 1804–1806)

William, Will, or Bill Pitt may also refer to:

== Arts and entertainment ==
- William Pitt (Mormon) (1813–1873), English bandleader and religious musician
- Brad Pitt (William Bradley Pitt, born 1963), American actor
- William Pitt (singer), American singer

== Law and politics ==
- William Pitt (courtier) (1559–1636), English courtier and politician who sat in the House of Commons
- William Morton Pitt (1764–1836), British politician and MP for Poole and Dorset
- Bill Pitt (politician) (1937–2017), British politician and MP for Croydon North West

== Nobility ==
- William Pitt Kalanimoku (1768–1827), Hawaiian noble, high chief to King Kamehameha I
- William Pitt Leleiohoku I (1821–1848), Hawaiian noble, son of Kalanimoku
- William Pitt Leleiohoku II (1854–1877), Crown Prince of Hawaii

== Sports ==
- William Pitt (cricketer) (1800–1871), English cricketer
- Bill Pitt (racing driver) (born 1926), Australian racing driver and motor racing official

== Other people ==
- William Augustus Pitt (c. 1728–1809), British army general
- William Pitt (ship-builder) (died 1840), English ship-builder
- William Pitt (engineer) (1840–1909), Canadian inventor of the underwater cable ferry
- William Pitt (architect) (1855–1918), Australian architect
- William Baker Pitt (1856–1936), English clergyman
- William Rivers Pitt (born 1971), American essayist and activist

== Other uses ==
- William Pitt (ship), a list of ships with the name
- William Pitt (1785 EIC ship), an East Indiaman
- William Pitt (1803 ship), a three-decker sailing ship
- William Pitt (1805 EIC ship), an East Indiaman

== See also ==
- Pitt (disambiguation)
- Pitt family
- Pitt ministry (disambiguation)
- Premiership of William Pitt (disambiguation)
