= Premiership of William Pitt =

Premiership of William Pitt may refer to:

- Premiership of William Pitt, 1st Earl of Chatham, as prime minister of Great Britain, 1766–1768
- First premiership of William Pitt the Younger, as prime minister of Great Britain and the United Kingdom, 1783–1801
- Second premiership of William Pitt the Younger, as prime minister of the United Kingdom, 1804–1806

== See also ==
- Great Britain in the Seven Years' War
- Pitt ministry (disambiguation)
- United Kingdom in the Napoleonic Wars
- William Pitt (disambiguation)
