= Almoran and Hamet =

1761 novel

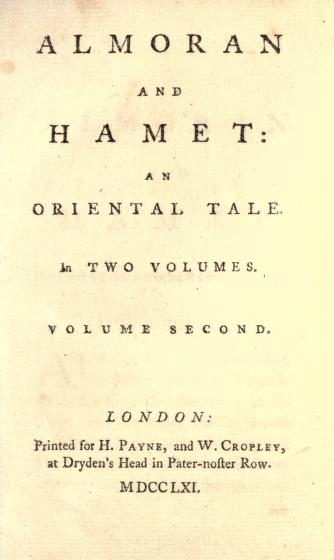
- Author: John Hawkesworth
- Language: English
- Genre: Oriental drama
- Publication date: 1761
- Media type: Print

Almoran and Hamet is a 1761 novel by the British writer John Hawkesworth, published in two volumes. Inspired by the style of Samuel Johnson's Rasselas it ran through six editions by 1796. Following the death of their father, two brother battle for the Persian throne.

== Stage adaptation ==
It provided the basis for the tragedy The Fair Circassian by Samuel Jackson Pratt successfully staged at the Theatre Royal, Drury Lane in November 1781.

== Bibliography ==
- Donald F. Bond & George, Sherburn. The Literary History of England: Vol 3: The Restoration and Eighteenth Century (1660-1789). Routledge, 2003.
- Watt, James. British Orientalisms, 1759–1835. Cambridge University Press, 2019.
