= John Hawkesworth (book editor) =

English writer (c. 1715 – 1773)

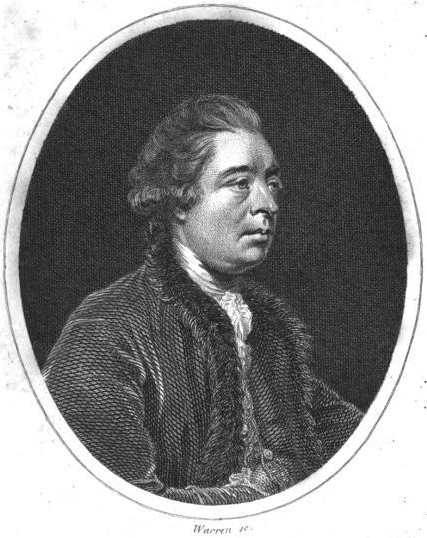
- Born: c. 1715; London, England, Great Britain
- Died: 16 November 1773 (aged c. 58)
- Notable work: Almoran and Hamet; An Account of the Voyages

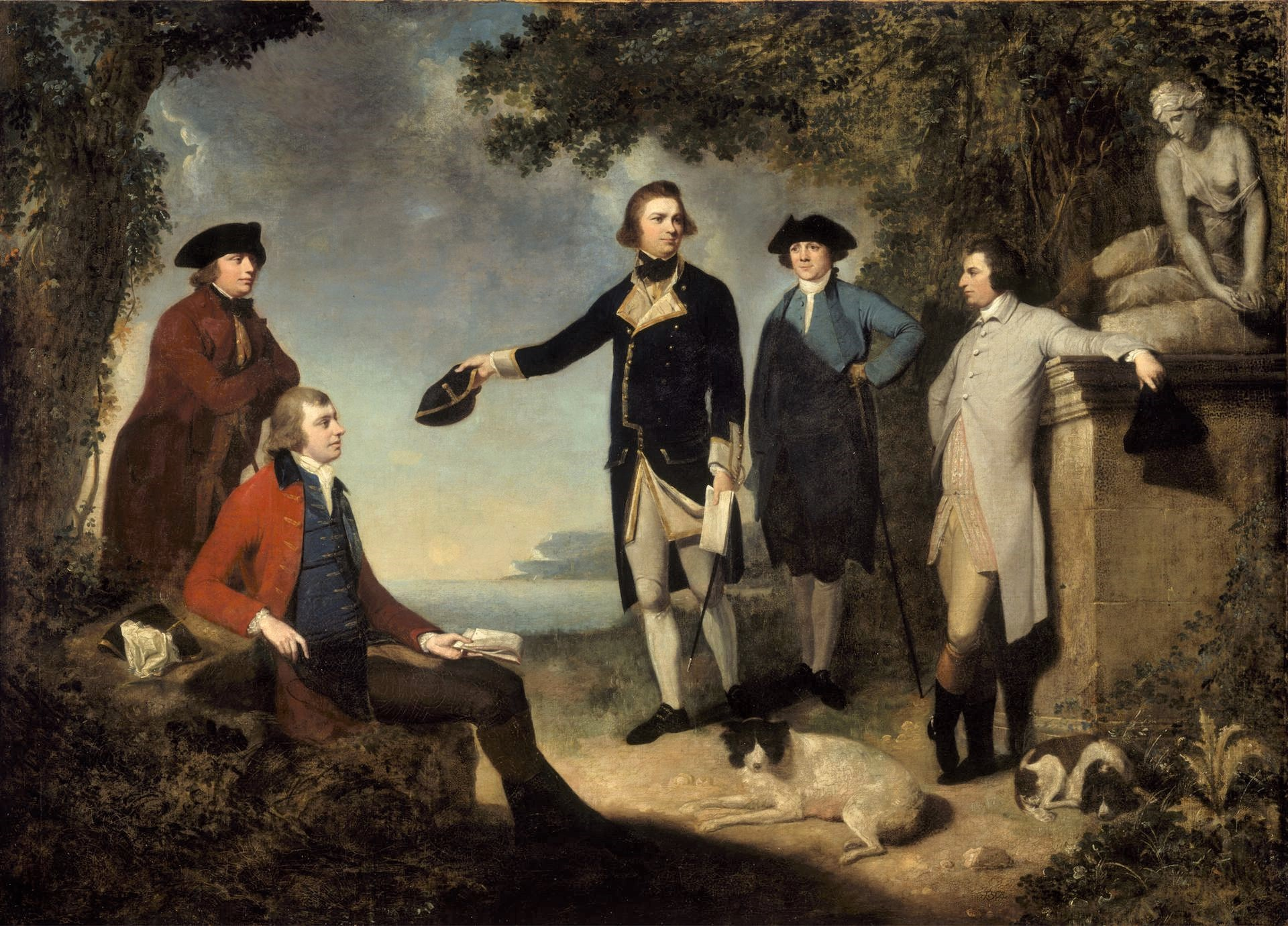
Dr Daniel Solander, Sir Joseph Banks, Captain James Cook, Dr John Hawkesworth and Lord Sandwich by John Hamilton Mortimer, 1771. Use a cursor to see who is who.

John Hawkesworth LLD (c. 1715 – 16 November 1773) was an English writer and book editor, born in London.

== Biography ==
In 1744, Hawkesworth succeeded Samuel Johnson as compiler of the parliamentary debates for the Gentleman's Magazine, and from 1741 to 1749 he contributed poems signed Greville, or H Greville, to that journal. In company with Johnson and others he started a periodical called The Adventurer, which ran to 140 issues, of which 70 were from the pen of Hawkesworth himself.

Because of his defence of morality and religion, Hawkesworth was rewarded by the Archbishop of Canterbury with the degree of LL.D. In 1754–1755 he published an edition (12 vols) of Swift's works, with a life prefixed that Johnson praised in his Lives of the Poets. A larger edition (27 vols) appeared in 1766–1779. He adapted Dryden's Amphitryon for the Drury Lane stage in 1756, and Southerne's Oronooko in 1759. He wrote the libretto of an oratorio Zimri in 1760, and the next year Edgar and Emmeline: a Fairy Tale was produced at Drury Lane. His Almoran and Hamet (1761) was first drafted as a play, and a tragedy based on it by S. J. Pratt, The Fair Circassian (1781), met with some success.

He was commissioned by the Admiralty to edit Captain James Cook's papers relative to his first voyage. For this work, An Account of the Voyages undertaken ... for making discoveries in the Southern Hemisphere and performed by Commodore Byrone John Byron, Captain Wallis, Captain Carteret and Captain Cook (from 1702 to 1771) drawn up from the Journals ... (3 vols, 1773) Hawkesworth is said to have received from the publishers the sum of £6000, an unprecented amount at the time, and An Account would go on to become one of the most popular travel books of the eighteenth century. His descriptions of the manners and customs of the South Seas were, however, regarded by many critics as inexact and hurtful to the interests of morality, and the severity of their strictures is said to have hastened his death. He was buried in the parish church at Bromley, Kent, where he and his wife had kept a school.

Hawkesworth was a close imitator of Johnson both in style and thought, and was at one time on very friendly terms with him. It is said that he presumed on his success, and lost Johnson's friendship as early as 1756.
