= The Fair Circassian =

Play by Samuel Jackson Pratt

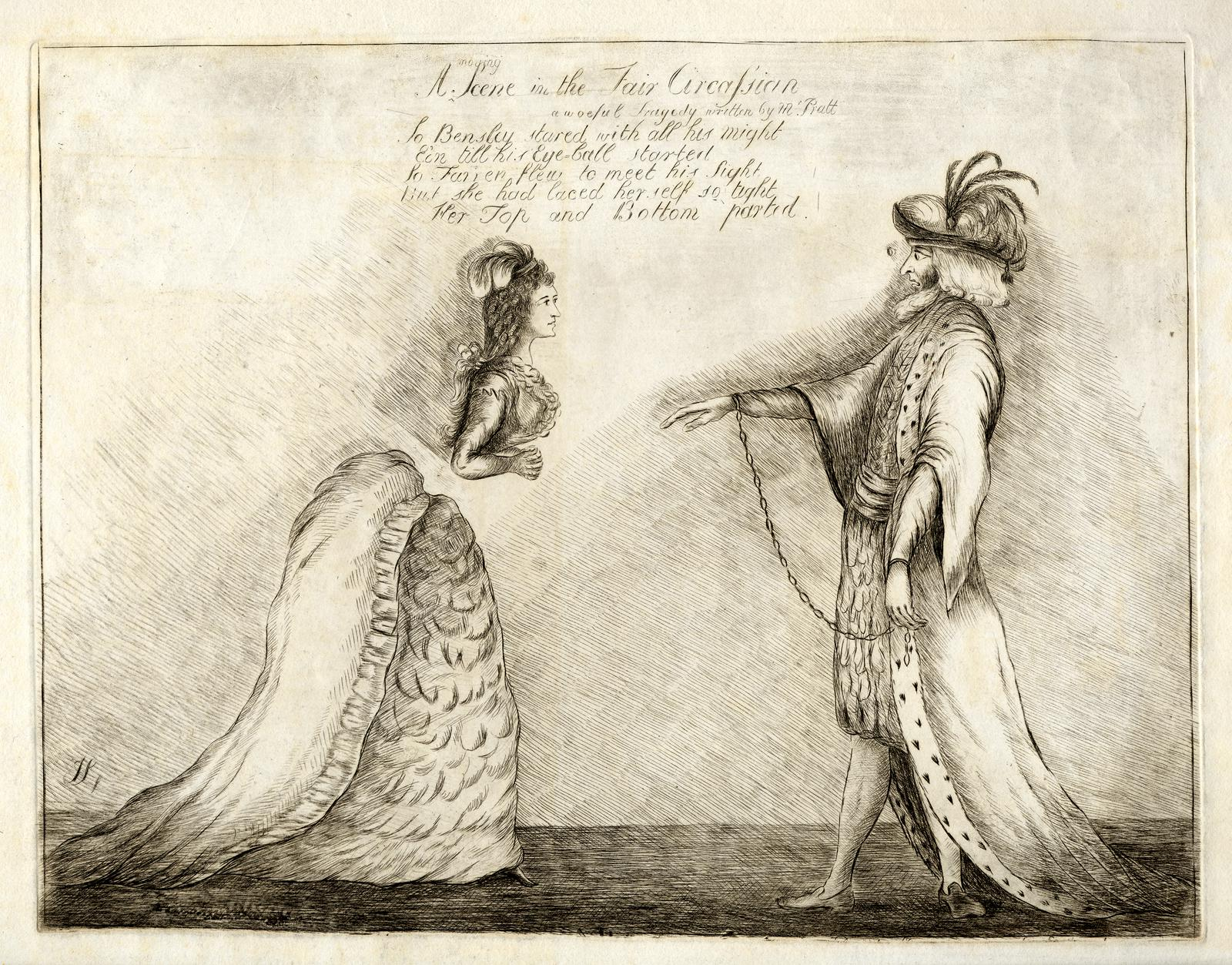
- Original language: English
- Written by: Samuel Jackson Pratt
- Genre: Tragedy

Premiere
- Date: 27 November 1781
- Place: Theatre Royal, Drury Lane

The Fair Circassian is a 1781 tragedy by the British writer Samuel Jackson Pratt. It is an adaptation of the novel Almoran and Hamet by John Hawkesworth. He wrote the lead role for his friend Sarah Siddons, but due to other commitments it ended up being played by Elizabeth Farren.

It premiered at the Theatre Royal, Drury Lane on 27 November 1781 with a cast that included William Smith as Hamet, Robert Bensley as Omar, John Hayman Packer as Ali, James Wrighten as Principle Iman and Elizabeth Farren as Almeida. The epilogue was written by the Irish Whig politician Richard FitzPatrick, although it has also been attributed to Richard Brinsley Sheridan.

== Bibliography ==
- Nicoll, Allardyce. A History of English Drama 1660-1900: Volume III. Cambridge University Press, 2009.
- Hogan, C.B (ed.) The London Stage, 1660-1800: Volume V. Southern Illinois University Press, 1968.
