= Anne Ley =

English writer, teacher and polemicist

Anne (Norman) Ley (c. 1599 – 1641) was an English writer, teacher, and polemicist. She wrote several poems, letters, meditations, and funerary texts. Her husband was Roger Ley, a writer and a curate of St. Leonard's Church in Shoreditch, Middlesex. Both of the couple were ardent royalists and religious conformists.

Her commonplace book and works survive to this day, compiled into a manuscript by her husband after her death in 1641.

== Early life ==
Anne Ley was born to Thomas Norman of Bedfordshire, a leatherseller, and his wife Anne (née Searle). Anne Ley was baptized on 19 August 1599 as "Annie" Norman. Thomas Norman was a graduate of St. Albany Hall, Oxford. He apparently belonged to the lower class, as he was enrolled as a "'pleb,'" as opposed to a "'gent.'"

At fifteen, Anne Ley was engaged to Roger Ley. They didn't marry until seven years later. According to Donald W. Foster in Women's Works, the reason for this prolonged engagement was "relative poverty: ‘their portions were only virtue, [which] would buy neither food nor raiment.’" In fact, the Leys ended up spending their whole lives in poverty.

The couple finally married on 25 February 1621 or 1622, at St. Bodolph's Church, Bishopgate.

== Life after marriage ==
After their marriage, the Leys established a parish school on Shoreditch to help with their finance. Anne Ley is said to have "by unparraleld industrie, taught herself Latin and Greek in order to teach" to "university standard" at the parish school.

The couple was close to the Shoreditch parish minister John Squire, who also used to be Roger Ley's classmate and friend. According to Jane Stevenson and Peter Davidson in Early Modern Women Poets (1520-1700): An Anthology, Squire was also "one of the most controversial figures in Church" at the time, "accused of asserting that papists were kings’ best subjects, of writing himself ‘priest’ and despising the appellations ‘ministor’ and ‘pastor,’ and of upholding priestly excommunication." Squire is said to have decorated his church with "’[p]ictures of the Virgin Mary, of Christ, and his 12 Apostles at his last supper in Glasse.’" The parishioners petitioned against him at some point, stating that "’hee hath peremptorily said, that none shall come hear to Preach, but himselfe or his Curate, so long as hee hath anything to doe in the place.’" Roger Ley likely would have also been "of the Laudian (or High Church) persuasion, and ... [Anne Ley], too, [would have] supported the direction in which Archbishop Laud and the King were taking the church."

Many of Anne Ley's later letters are written from Roger Ley's country house in Northchurch, Hertfordshire. And she seems to have stayed there until her death eleven years later, while Roger Ley stayed in London. Foster says that it's likely that she did so to "escape the plague which broke out in 1636, when she wrote a will, or the earlier plague of 1625." But it was "clearly a reluctant exile, as she repeatedly expresses a desire to return to her beloved London." In a letter to her father, she "complains of enforced exile" and portrays herself as "a banished Ulysses." Foster comments that "Anna Ley, Hester Pulter, and Anne Bradstreet are among the married writers who explain of their isolation, having no adult companionship while their husbands are gone."

Anne Ley became sick with a "lengthy but unspecified illness" sometime before her death in 1641. When she died during the first week of October, 1641, she was buried next to her parents at her husband's Shoreditch parish. The burial took place on 21 or 22 October 1641.

== Roger Ley ==
Roger Ley was born in 1593 or 1594 at Crewe, Cheshire. Neither of his parents is identified. In 1606, Roger Ley enrolled at Jesus College, Cambridge. He graduated with a B.A. in 1610 and an M.A. in 1613. On 11 April 1614, he was ordained as a deacon in Peterborough. On 31 May 1618, he was ordained as a priest in London. Shortly afterwards, he was appointed as the curate to St. Leonard’ s Church in Shoreditch.

He published two of his sermons on Paul's Cross: ‘The Sceptor of Righteousness’ (20 December 1618) and ‘The Bruising of the Serpent's Head’ (9 September 1621). According to Roger Ley's Oxford Dictionary of National Biography entry by Keith Lindley, these works "reveal a firm belief in the Calvinist doctrine of election to salvation, an early opposition to Arminianism, a preoccupation with the threat posed by the Antichrist, and an awareness of the danger of religion's being polluted by superstition and idolatry." Roger Ley also wrote Gesta Britannica, a history of the British Church told in Latin. Gesta Britannica consisted of ten volumes, which, according to Foster, "extended from the first Celtic converts of ancient Britain through the death of Charles I." Roger Ley finished the first draft on 28 April 1664, when he was 70-years old. Most importantly, Gesta Britannica includes "in pass[ing] various details and anecdotes from the author's own person experience": for instance, he records his survival of "the London plague of 1625 ... the tribulation of the Civil War, and the repression of Cromwell's government." Although he was a Calvinist, Roger Ley strongly criticized how the "churches were desecrated, and the clergy mistreated, by Puritans before and during the Interregnum."

In The Arts of Remembrance in Early Modern England: Memorial Cultures of the Post Reformation, Andrew Gordon and Thomas Rist comment on Roger Ley's works as following:

Civil war ecclesiastical politics dominated these texts. ‘A New Samosatenian’ records his disputation with the anti-Trinitarian Paul Best, his former chamber-fellow at Jesus College, Cambridge. His cycle of nine elegies, ‘Albion in blacke,’ was written in response to the civil wars, its concluding poem vindicating the Restoration.

According to Lindley, Roger Ley is also famous for his "outright denunciation of Paul Best for anti-trinitarian views."

Roger Ley served as the rector of Brean, Somerset from 1663 until his death in 1668. According to Lindley, Roger Ley wrote his will on 30 October 1667, leaving "an interest in a tenement" at Limehouse, Middlesex, "a seven-year lease on a house in Phoenix Alley ... Westminster," "a small library of books," and the "contents of the house ... at Wells." He named his nephew, Timothy Ley, and Isaac Saunderson, a vicar of Plumstead, Kent as his executors. It can be inferred from this information (and from the fact that Anne Ley's will doesn't mention any children either) that the Leys had no surviving child, if they had any. His burial was most likely in Brean.

== Commonplace manuscript ==
Most of what we now know about the Leys are drawn from their commonplace manuscript, which is currently located at the William Andrews Clark Library in Los Angeles. It has surviving material from the 1620s to 1641, including poems, commonplace book entries, funerary texts, meditations, and letters to family, friends, and "young university men, probably erstwhile pupils"—two of which are fully written in Latin, displaying her proficiency at the language. These works were compiled by Roger Ley from loose papers into the commonplace manuscript, after Anne Ley's death in 1641.

In Early Modern Women's Manuscript Poetry, Jill Seal Millman and Gillian Wright describe the commonplace manuscript as "a quarto of 262 folios, with a number of short blank sections, bound in brown calf, repaired and rebacked at an unknown, although much later, date."

=== History ===
In 1825, Joseph Hunter received the commonplace manuscript from Benjamin Heywood Bright, an antiquarian. The manuscript was later labeled as Phillipps MS 17400, and it was then purchased by the William Andrews Clark Library in 1952 from Peter Murray Hill.

=== Contents and structure ===
According to Gordon and Rist, the commonplace manuscript consists of mainly three sections: "Anne's commonplace book; her poems, letters and funerary texts; and Roger's writings." Roger Ley is the "main scribe," but all of the commonplace book entries are in Anne Ley's handwriting, with "titles and some corrections provided in Roger's." According to Millman and Wright, her entries are "largely extracted from the popular printed Meditations by Bishop Joseph Hall."

Then there is a "memorial section on Anne, comprising her will of 1636 ... her funeral sermon preached on 24 October 1641, her gravestone inscription, and the conclusion to one of her earliest poems." Afterwards are Roger Ley's writings: "two theological treatises (‘A New Samosatenian’ and ‘A treatise of predestination’), a cycle of nine elegies [called "'Albion in blacke or Happie England growne miserable'"], a prose commemoration of the Restoration (‘The peace of Hierusalem’), and a 1633 funeral sermon [on Joan Winship] preached in the church."

=== The question of the husband as the compiler ===
The question of Roger Ley's role in compiling the manuscript remains a topic of discussion. For instance, Erica Longfellow, in Women and Religious Writing in Early Modern England, states that the "Ley manuscripts offer evidence of a widower's use of his wife's literary remains for political or personal advantage ... [and of how he] included a memorial of his wife's pious letters and poems as the centerpiece of a manuscript that celebrated Laudian heroes." Millman and Wright point out that there is also the possibility that Roger Ley "may have been engaged in a retrospective re(ordering) of his wife's writings" and that the "extent to which he may also have manipulated them is a matter worth consideration." On the other hand, Gordon and Rist note that "[t]his is a manuscript that jointly presents the writings of a wife and husband" and that "[l]ike Sibthorpe and Egerton, Roger Ley is ordering his wife's literary remains—but in this case, alongside his own."

=== Selections from Ley's works ===
According to Gordon and Rist, Anne Ley's "earliest dateable" poem in the commonplace manuscript is "A Sermon Preached in St. Paul's Church upon the Second Commandment by Mr. Squire, January 6, 1623," in which she criticizes "’Rome's gross idolatry’" and "mocks English papist who, like Adam and Eve in the Garden, ‘with leaves, their nakedness would hide, [avoiding] the touch of Truth.’"

Other early poems include writings on the death of King James and the subsequent succession of Charles I.

On the Death of King James

Our Sun departed yet no night appeared:

The cause (obscure) was by Urania cleared,

Who heard this hymn sung in the Aonian grove:

"Phoebus must leave his orb, and shine with Jove.

And in the moment when this thing is done,

Must Charles's Wain be England's glorious Sun.

They ride on, Charles! Keep Sol's old trackéd ways!

And may thy radian beams equal his rays.

Heavens grant thy steed may ne’er be out of wind

Till thou quite through the universe has shined,

And that our sphere admit no other car

Till thou, our planet, be a fixéd star!

Upon the Great Plague, Following the Death of King James

Afflicted England, how thine ills increase

And seems to threaten thine approaching fall,

And to bereave thee of that happy peace

For which all nations do thee blesséd call.

The dreadful pestilence doth now begin

To shed its venom in thy chiefest seat—

Denouncing judgment for thy heinous sin

Except repentance, Mercy do entreat.

And lest this punishment should seem too small,

Behold, another stroke doth wound they head:

Renownéd James, that was admired of all

For learnéd skill, thy king of peace, is dead.

—Whose gentle nature, though it did decline

The sad aspect of war's most direful look.

In future ages shall his valor shine

For one brave combat which he undertook:

His pen, the weapon was; the Truth, the cause

(His proud foe, Rome, the murderer of kings);

Whose worthy work, deserving high applause,

Hath left the Romanists a deadly sting.

And we are left in sorrow to lament

This heavy loss with fear what will ensue;

But He which us this great affliction sent

In deepest woes, His mercy did renew:

Our Sun no sooner set, and doleful night

Seemed to threaten some disaster strange,

A glorious Star with splendor shining bright

Expelled those fears: our grief, to mirth, did change.

One of Anne Ley's poems, "Upon the necessity and benefite of learning ... to W.B. a young scholler," was presumably written for one of her students, advising him on the importance of keeping a commonplace book. Stevenson and Davidson comment that this poem "sheds some interesting light on how one of the ‘commonplace books’ which survive in quantity from the seventeenth century was supposed to be used by its compiler."

Upon the necessity and benefite of learning written in

the beginning of a Common place booke belonging to W.B. a young scholler

As from each fragrant sweet the honey Bee

Extracts that moisture is of so much use;

Like careful labour I commend to thee;

Which if performed much profit will produce.

In this great universe that may compare

To learnings worth which beautifies the minde

Adornes the body makes it seem more faire

And with the best doth kind acceptance finde.

All other hopes how soone they may decay

Like faire flowers nipt with suddaine blast

Friends are but mortall riches flie away,

Tis onely this proves constant to the last.

Which to obtaine employ your chiefest skill,

Heere is an hive to treasure up your store,

Which with each useful sentence you may fill

T’will be a meanes that you aloft may soare

To learnings pitch, where that you once may rest

Il’e lend a hand, doe you but doe your may.

The commonplace manuscript also contains a short, undated letter (likely an except) that Anne Ley wrote to her father, concerning poetry:

“I am glad to heare you are so merilie disposed, as to enter into that veine of peotrie; or else it may be these times, wherein our London is changed to Aracadia.”

Lastly, the following poem is about the birth and atonement of Jesus Christ:

A Christmasse Caroll: or verses on the Nativitie of Christe

Most blessed time wherein we celebrate,

his happie birth which was both God and man,

Whoe came to save us from eternall hate,

Such length and depth of mercie none can scan.

We being dead and doomed to live in hell,

by Adams sinne of which we all pertake:

the promised seed that sentence did expel,

Being given us atonment for to make.

But after such a manner it was done,

as men and Angels could not comprehend,

that our offended God should send his Sonne

which was true God by death our fault to mend.

Whose birth was rare, conception most divine.

Gordon and Rist argue that Anne Ley's works are "serious verses, inspired by parish sermons and local parishioners, the death of King James and subsequent plague, the nativity, and political events of 1640-1641." Gordon and Rist note that "[h]er scholarship and literary activity are conspicuous in her letters" and that, according to the evidence, "Anne Ley was a keen writer, immersed in London parish life ... participating in a vibrant manuscript culture facilitated by their professional and familial circles."
