= Mrs. Prosser =

English author

Mrs. Prosser (pseud.) or Sophie Amelia Prosser, born Sophia Amelia Dibdin (17 May 1807 – 14 February 1882) was a British writer. She was known for her sentimental morality tales and fables.

== Personal ==
Prosser was born in London, the daughter of Charles Dibdin the Younger and his wife Mary Bates. She was the granddaughter of the extremely prolific songwriter Charles Dibdin, and may have inherited her productive bent from him.

On 1 January 1830 she married William Prosser, a surgeon and later a clergyman.

Prosser is buried in Bilston, Staffordshire, England.

== Career ==
Most of Prosser's books were apparently first published by the Religious Tract Society of London, England, and reprinted by that group for many years thereafter (some of the volumes are imprinted as having been published by the Leisure Hour Office, which may also have been an imprint of the Religious Tract Society).

All of her books were imprinted "By Mrs. Prosser" without any more details given.

== Style ==
The books are generally exceedingly slim novellas or collections of short stories. They are not considered of the highest literary standard, and their stilted, moralizing tone is of a sort that the author Lewis Carroll lampooned.

== Bibliography ==
- Amos Fayle, or Through the Wilderness Into a Wealthy Place (Published by James Nisbet, 1878).
- The Awdries and Their Friends.
- The Cheery Chime of Garth & Other Stories (1870).
- The Cheery Chime of Garth and Lame Jock's Carol.
- Cicely Brown's Trials: How She Got Into Them, How She Got Out of Them, and What They Did For Her.
- The Clackitts of Inglebrook Hall.
- The Crinkles Of Crinklewood Hall.
- The Day After To-morrow.
- The Days of the Cattle Plague.
- The Dearest of Daisies, and The Pearl Of Days.
- The Door Without a Knocker and Other Tales.
- The Echoed Song, and Weeping Willoughby.
- Fables For the Young Folks.
- Face In the Shutter, or The Powdering Room.
- Farmer Truefit's Barley; and The Old Pear-Tree House (1888).
- Frog Alley, and What Came Out Of It (undated, binding appears to be 1880s).
- Golden—Golden—All Golden and Other Stories (undated, binding appears to be 1860s).
- How Jarvis Got His House, An Incident Of Life In the Black Country and Saluting the Colors.
- Humphrey Pace and His Wife Hannah, and Other Stories.
- The Light On The Wall & Other Stories (earliest publication date seen: 1895).
- Ludovic, or The Boy's Victory (undated, circa 1880s).
- The Master of Aynhoe.
- Michael Airdree's Freehold.
- Oakby, Showing How New Troubles Came Into an English Parish; and Number Twenty-nine, London: James Nesbit & Co. (1881).
- Original Fables and Sketches (1864).
- Quality Fogg's Old Ledger (1869).
- The Sale of Callowfields.
- The Sparrow On the Housetop, and Wishing and Wanting (inscription dated 1890).
- The Strange Fox-Hunter, and The Blank Sheet (inscription dated 1890).
- Sunday at Home—a Family Magazine for Sabbath Reading. Appeared in volumes from 1871, 1872, 1875, 1877 (stories: "The Echoed Song" and "Number Twenty Nine"), and 1881, and likely others.
- Sunshine, or Cures for All Ills (undated, circa 1860).
- Susan Osgood's Prize: A New Story About an Old One.
- Tiger Jack.
- Uncle Christie—The Strange Lodger.
- The Wise Man Of Wittlebury, or, Charity Begins At Home.

== See also ==
- Religious Tract Society
- Lutterworth Press
