= Samuel Jackson Pratt =

English poet, dramatist and novelist (1749–1814)

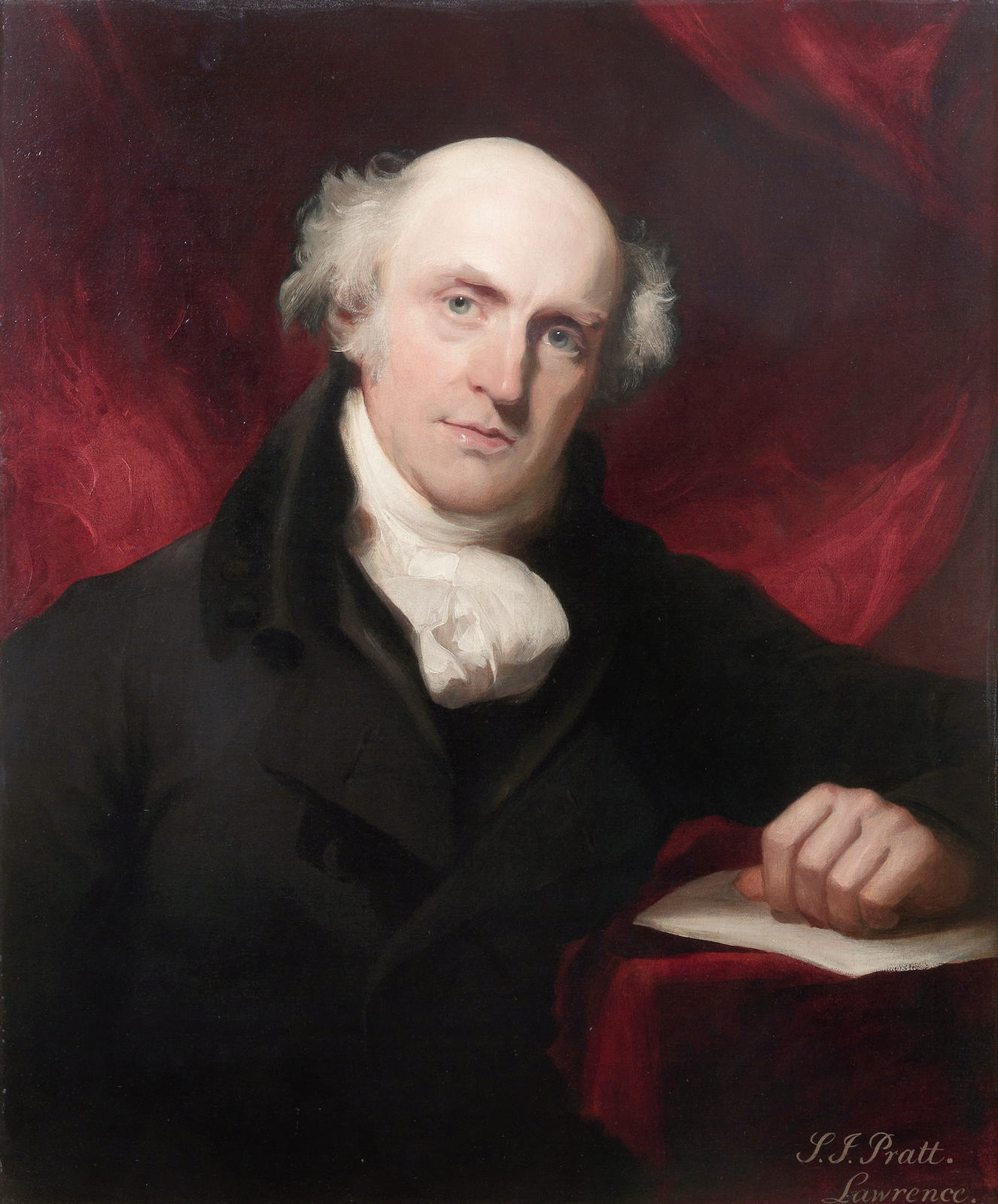
- Born: 25 December 1749; St Ives, Huntingdonshire
- Died: 4 October 1814 (aged 64); Birmingham, West Midlands
- Education: Felsted, Essex
- Occupations: Writer, poet & dramatist
- Spouse: "Mrs Charlotte Melmoth"
- Writing career
- Pen name: "Courtney Melmoth"
- Language: English
- Period: 18th & 19th Centuries

Samuel Jackson Pratt (25 December 1749 – 4 October 1814) was a prolific English poet, dramatist and novelist, writing under the pseudonym of "Courtney Melmoth" as well as under his own name. He authored around 40 publications between 1770 and 1810, some of which are still published today, and is probably best remembered as the author of Emma Corbett: or the Miseries of Civil War, (1780) and the poem Sympathy (1788). Although his reputation was tainted by scandal during his lifetime, he is today recognised as an early campaigner for animal welfare and the first English writer to treat the American Revolution as a legitimate subject for literature.

== Biography ==
=== Early life ===
Samuel Jackson Pratt was born "to a very respectable family" on 25 December 1749, in St Ives, Huntingdonshire. His father was a brewer, who twice served as High Sheriff of Huntingdonshire. Pratt was educated at Felsted, in Essex and was later ordained as a Church of England clergyman. His first published writing, as "Rev Mr Pratt of Peterborough" was an elegy, entitled Partridges, published in 1771, which appeared in popular poetry collections through most of the 19th century. He was described as 'an esteemed and popular preacher' but by 1773 had become entangled in a scandalous love affair and left the church to become an actor under the stage name 'Courtney Melmoth"

=== "Sham marriage" ===
Some time in the early 1770s, Pratt entered into a marital-like relationship with a lady who thereafter referred to herself as "Mrs Charlotte Melmoth" (Melmoth being Pratt's stage-name). Her maiden name is unknown. According to A History of The City of Brooklyn, Charlotte "had been duped into a sham marriage, while at boarding school, by a Mr. Pratt (known in the literary and theatrical circles of that day as Courtney Melmoth ), and with him went upon the stage, playing in several companies both in England and Ireland.". Pratt's parents strongly disapproved of the relationship and it is not known whether or not the marriage was ever legally formalised. The couple toured together in theatrical productions, unsuccessfully, and eventually had to resort to telling fortunes to make their living.

By 1777 the couple were briefly in Paris, where they met Benjamin Franklin who lent the couple money which they struggled to repay. Charlotte, like Pratt, considered herself a poet, and Pratt sent Franklin copies of some of his wife's poetry.

In 1781 the couple separated and Charlotte embarked on a solo acting career. In 1793 she emigrated to America where she gained a reputation as "The Grande Dame of Tragedy on the Early American Stage". The couple would never meet again.

The relationship was to taint Pratt's reputation with the reading public as indicating a dubious moral character; one obituary published after his death tactfully refers to the relationship as "such indiscretions as too frequently accompany genius"; others simply omit any reference to his marriage altogether.

=== Stage career ===
In 1773, having abandoned his Church career, Pratt made his first appearance as an actor under the name 'Courtney Melmoth' at the Smock Alley Theatre, in Dublin, playing Marc Antony in John Dryden's All For Love but with no great success. He then took a theatre company to Drogheda, again with no success, and the theatre closed after three months. In 1774 he appeared as Hamlet at the Covent Garden Theatre but his performance was again judged a failure. One critic wrote that he walked with "a kind of airy swing that rendered his acting at times rather ludicrous." After this he gave up the stage and took to writing full-time although he still continued to take occasional parts opposite his wife until around 1781.

=== Later life ===
In 1774, having given up the stage, he had his first literary success – a poem entitled The Tears of A Genius, occasioned by the Death of Dr Goldsmith which attracted the attention of the reading public, and from then onwards he was able to make a living by writing. By 1776 he had moved to Bath, where he entered into a part-ownership of a book-shop in Milsom Street with a partner of the name of Clinch. As with his previous professions, he soon decided that he was not suited to the life of a book-seller and returned to London within a few years. However he made many friends in Bath and became part of the fashionable Bath society, making the acquaintance of the famous actress Mrs Siddons, for whom he would later write leading character parts in his plays. He later fell out with Mrs Siddons after borrowing £500 from her husband and becoming offended when she asked him to repay it.

By 1802 he was in Birmingham, a well-known literary figure with a reputation for being willing to help and advise aspiring writers, including a young George Mogridge, who would later find fame as "Old Humphrey". In 1814 he fell from his horse, resulting in a long illness, from which he died on 4 October 1814 in his home at Colmore Row, Birmingham.

== Literary career ==
Pratt's first poem, written while he was still a clergyman, was The Partridges – an elegy. Published in The Annual Register in 1771, it was a 10-verse tale of a mother partridge praying for the safety of her chicks during the shooting season, and revealed Pratt's concern for animal welfare which would be reflected in later writings. It was included in many collections of popular poetry throughout the 19th Century.

However, it was his The Tears of A Genius, occasioned by the Death of Dr Goldsmith (1774) which first caught the public's attention: written within a few hours of Goldsmith's death, it contained poetry written in imitation of Goldsmith's style and was published under Pratt's pseudonym of 'Courtney Melmoth'.

Over the next six years he produced twelve further works as 'Courtney Melmoth' including An Apology for the Life and Writings of David Hume (1777); Shenstone Green, or the New Paradise Lost (1779); Emma Corbett (1780) and Shadows of Shakespeare, a Monody on Death of Garrick (1779): lines from the latter are quoted on Garrick's memorial in Westminster Abbey. In 1781 he began writing under his own name, with a tragic play entitled The Fair Circassian, and most of his following works were published as by Samuel Jackson Pratt.

During the 1790s he produced his popular Gleanings through Wales, Holland and Westphalia and Gleanings in England, which went through several editions. In total he penned seven novels (in twenty-three volumes), ten plays and twenty-three volumes of poems, 'miscellanies' and travel journals.

=== The Pupil of Pleasure ===
In 1776 he scandalised the literary world with a novel, satirising Lord Chesterfield, entitled The Pupil of Pleasure or The New System (Lord Chesterfield's) Illustrated, describing a fictional series of seductions in Buxton. Its licentious tone evoked letters of complaints, the author being described as "a dissipated clergyman" and the Monthly Review magazine said of it "It is unnatural and shocking – it cannot be read without disgust.' Pratt's reputation suffered as a result, and, in an attempt to repair the damage he wrote a moral work, The Tutor of Truth', two years later, of which the Monthly Review conceded "it is more inoffensive than any of the previous productions of this writer."

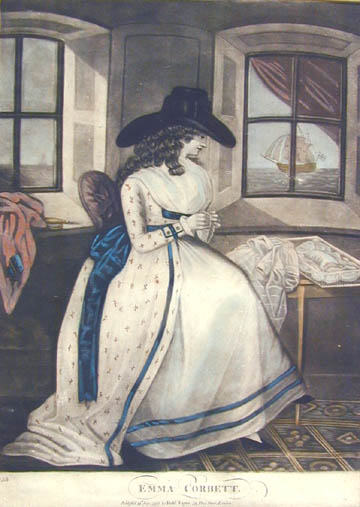
Illustration from a 1788 edition of "Emma Corbett"

=== Emma Corbett ===
In 1780 Pratt, still using the name Courtney Melmoth, published his most historically significant novel: Emma Corbett or, The miseries of civil war. Founded on some recent circumstances which happened in America. In the novel, the title-character, Emma, travels to America to find her lover, Henry, a British soldier. She is captured by American rebels, but released on George Washington's orders. She finds Henry, wounded by a poisoned arrow fired by an American 'Indian', and sucks out the venom, poisoning herself in the process. Henry dies and the fatally ill Emma travels back to England with their child, to die. The novel was highly praised on its release and passed through many editions in several languages. Today, however, its principal significance is, firstly, its depiction of Anglo-American relations during the American War of Independence, and, secondly, that it was the first English novel to address the subject of the American Revolution.

=== Dramatic works ===
As well as his poems, novels and 'miscellanies', Pratt drew upon his theatre experience to write ten plays, although three were never performed or published. His first play, Joseph Andrews, was an adaptation of Henry Fielding's novel of the same name, and was acted at Theatre Royal, Drury Lane on 20 April 1778, with the role of Fanny being played by Mary Robinson. Pratt would eventually write the epitaph for Mary Robinson's tombstone. The play has never been published. His most successful dramatic work was The Fair Circassian, an adaptation of John Hawkesworth's novel Almoran and Hamet, and was first performed at Drury Lane on 27 November 1781. The leading part was written for Pratt's friend, the actress Mrs Siddons, but she was unavailable and the part was played by Elizabeth Farren (later Countess of Derby) instead. The Fair Circassian was published in many editions, and is still in print today. His 1783 comedy The School for Vanity was also staged at Drury Lane.

=== Animal welfare ===
Pratt was a campaigner against cruelty towards animals and an opponent of hunting and blood-sports. Many of his writings reflect this concern, including his most famous poem, Sympathy (1788) which argues that man was "born to share" the earth with all other living creatures and asks "Why must man subsist by prey?". In Humanity, or the Rights of Nature he attacks hunting, demanding "For hunger kill, but never sport with life". A review in Gentleman's Magazine of Lord Erskine's speech in support of the Bill for Preventing Malicious and Wanton Cruelty to Animals" (1809) said of Pratt, "Certainly [no living author has] expatiated more on this subject [cruelty to animals] than the Author of "Sympathy," both in his poetical and prose writings. Indeed, nearly a third of a volume of the "Gleanings" of that Writer has been consecrated to this subject."

== Critical reception ==
Critical reception to Pratt's works was mixed during his lifetime. His scandalous "sham marriage" and the public furore over his "unnatural and shocking" novel The Pupil of Pleasure damaged his reputation, giving him a 'dubious moral character' which deterred respectable readers. His poem Sympathy, however, was noted for its 'feeling, energy and beauty' and the Gentleman's Magazine remarked

"It is a just tribute to his character to say that all his works strongly tended to promote the interests of benevolence and virtue. Though his literary fame has been somewhat overcast by the extraordinary success of several contemporary poets, yet it is probable that many of his works will be admired when most of theirs has sunk into oblivion."

However the same publication also noted that "his chief error was not knowing how to check the exuberance of his feeling and imagination; and therefore he sometimes diffused his sentiments to a tedious extent." Charles Lamb lambasted his Gleanings as "A wretched assortment of vapid feelings", although the same volume was popular enough with readers to pass through many editions. The London Magazine said of The Tutor of Truth, "We can recommend this sprightly and at the same time instructive romance in the warmest terms." The Catalogue of Five Hundred Authors Now Living (1788) summarised his works with the succinct phrase "There are people now living who believe that they possess a degree of merit." The Gentleman's Magazine obituary of Pratt summarised his life with the words

"No man who ever attained public distinction was more exempt from envy; and though he may, in the vicissitudes of a life unsupported by fortune and exposed to all the casualties of a precarious subsistence, have fallen into errors, nothing of malice or ill-nature can justly be imputed to him; and as his works are all intended to promote the interests of virtue, none of these errors should be remembered in his epitaph."
