= Karen Platt =

British gardening author and publisher

Karen Platt is a British gardening author and publisher, best known for the reference book Black Magic and Purple Passion. She started her writing career in 1996 by self-publishing her first book, The Seed Search. She has been on BBC television, KATU, HGTV and BBC Radio several times. Her publications have been recommended by Alan Titchmarsh and others. Since 2001, much of her work has involved popularizing black plants; she founded the International Black Plant Society in 2002. Platt also runs a nursery called Black Plant Nursery.

== Selected works ==
- Black Magic and Purple Passion, 2004, ISBN 0-9545764-2-X
- Gold Fever, 2004, ISBN 0-9545764-1-1
- Seed Sowing and Growing Success, 2003, ISBN 0-9545764-0-3
- Silver Lining, 2005, ISBN 0-9545764-3-8
- Plant Names A-Z, 1999, ISBN 0-9528810-3-9
- Emeralds, 2005, ISBN 0-9545764-4-6
- The Seed Search 5th edition, 2002, ISBN 0-9528810-8-X
- Plant Synonyms, 2006 ISBN 0-9545764-5-4
- Lifestyle Gardening, 2007 ISBN 0-9545764-6-2
