= Harold Alfred Manhood =

British author

Harold Alfred Manhood (born 6 May 1904 Leyton, Essex - died January 1991 Haywards Heath district, West Sussex) was a British author, particularly of short stories who for much of his life lived in a converted railway carriage in the Sussex countryside growing his own food and brewing his own cider. Harold Manhood was born in 1904 to Henry Alfred Manhood (born 1872 Bromley-by-Bow, London a railway worker and house carpenter) and his mother Alice Norris (born c.1878 Bromley-by-Bow, London). Many of Manhood's stories had a rural setting, and would often touch upon the weird and supernatural. His short story collections include Nightseed and other Tales (1928), Apples by Night (1932) and Fierce and Gentle (1935). His novel Gay Agony was published in 1930. Manhood contributed 97 tales to the Evening News between 1934 and 1964. Other short stories appeared in Argosy, Lilliput, The Star and John O'London's Weekly.
