= Suzanne Portnoy =

Suzanne Portnoy (born 1961) is the author of the best-selling explicit memoir The Butcher, The Baker, the Candlestick Maker: An Erotic Memoir (Random House, 2006), The Not-So-Invisible Woman (Random House, 2008) and the play Looser Women, which was performed in 2011 at the Edinburgh Festival. She has been a publicist for the last twenty years.

== Memoirs ==
The book charts her journey through a sexually liberated youth, largely sexless marriage then divorce and the pursuit of a lifestyle of multiple partners, group sex, loss of someone close and being mother to two children. Parallels can be drawn with The Sexual Life of Catherine M., in the honesty of its approach and its graphic detail.

== Personal life ==
Suzanne Portnoy lives in northwest London. She is Jewish.
