= Martin Oliver (author) =

British author of children's books

Martin Oliver is a British author of children's books. In 2013 he gained notoriety online via the Huffington Post, after an 8-year-old girl had his books "Girls Only: How to Survive Anything" and "Boys Only: How to Survive Anything" pulled from bookstore shelves for claims of sexism.

== Bibliography ==
=== Usborne Puzzle Adventure series ===
- The Intergalactic Bus Trip (1987)
- Agent Arthur's Jungle Journey (1988)
- Search for the Sunken City (1989)
- Agent Arthur's Arctic Adventure (1990)
- Agent Arthur on the Stormy Seas (1991)
- Agent Arthur's Desert Challenge (1994)
- Agent Arthur's Mountain Mission (unpublished)

=== The Young Indiana Jones Chronicles series ===
- Indiana Jones Puzzle Adventure Storybooks: II (The Young Indiana Jones Chronicles) (1994)

=== Usborne Whodunnit series ===
- The Deckchair Detectives (1995)

=== Young Hippo Adventure series ===
- Attack of the Vampirates (1995)
- Revenge of the Vampirates (1995)

=== Hippo Ghost series ===
- The House at the End of Ferry Road (1995)

=== You Should See My... series ===
- You Should See My Dog (1995)
- You Should See My Cat (1996)
- You Should See My Mum (1998)

=== What's Wrong Mum? series ===
- Seaside (1997)
- Garden (1998)
- Shopping (1998)
- The Fletcher Family's Picnic Puzzle (1997)

=== Sparks series ===
- The Winner's Wreath: Ancient Greek Olympics (1999)

=== The Knowledge series ===
- Dead Dinosaurs (2000)
- Groovy Movies (2004)

=== Spilling the Beans on series ===
- Spilling the Beans on Making It in the Movies (2001, ISBN 1-84236-013-2)
- Spilling the Beans on Blackbeard (2000, ISBN 1-902947-40-1)

=== Other books ===
- McKricken's Christmas (1991)
- Giggle Mirths of Waggle-down Derry (1991)
- "Flintstone's" Mystery Puzzle Book (1994)
- Goldilocks and the Three Bears (1999)
