= Paul Best =

Paul Best (Hutton Cranswick c.1590 - Driffield, 1657) was one of the first British converts to the "Socinian" Polish Brethren, and one of the first Unitarians to be imprisoned.

Best studied at Jesus College, Cambridge, graduating B.A. in 1609-10 and M.A. in 1613. He was made a fellow of St Catharine's College, Cambridge in 1617. In April 1617 he inherited the family manor at Elmswell, East Riding of Yorkshire, a part of which he sold to finance his travels in Europe from the 1620s to the 1630s, as an adventurer and mercenary who had fought under Gustavus Adolphus at the Battle of Lützen (1632). He then returned to England and fought in the Parliamentary Army during 1644 - the year King Charles I lost control of Yorkshire.

It is not clear at what point Best visited Poland and Transylvania and was exposed to Socinian belief. It may also be that he studied Socinian teaching in Germany. It is also not clear whether the Socinians being conscientious objectors had any relation or not to Best's military career being brought to an end. Best visited Europe again in the 1640s, but also had contact with Socinians in London.

In 1644 Best made the mistake of showing a manuscript work on the Trinity to a supposed friend, the Rev. Roger Ley, "for his judgment and advice only" who informed on Best, who was then charged with antitrinitarianism and on 14 February 1644 incarcerated at the Gatehouse, Westminster making two petitions to Parliament in April 1646 and August 1646 During 1647 he may have had free contact with another prisoner at the Gatehouse, Westminster, and another early convert to Socinian belief, John Biddle. It was at this point that Best published the appeal for which his name is remembered Mysteries discovered - both an appeal for his release and restoration of a modest military pension, but more dangerously an open acknowledgement of Socinian teaching and an attack on the doctrine of the Trinity as the iniquity of 2 Thessalonians 2:7.

His work was smuggled out of gaol, printed, and then seized and burned. Parliament then sentenced Best to death, but, with the assistance of former comrades in arms in the Parliamentary Army, and probably with the personal assistance of Oliver Cromwell he was released, secured his pension and retired to Elmswell.

A direct result of Best's 1646-7 publications was the Blasphemy Act of 1648, which made it a felony to doubt the Trinity or the validity of any of the standard books of the Protestant Bible. It was quickly forgotten following the rise of the Ranters in 1649, which necessitated another Blasphemy Act directed at them.

He died on 17 September 1657 at Great Driffield, Yorkshire.
