= George Mogridge (writer) =

British author of children's books and religious tracts

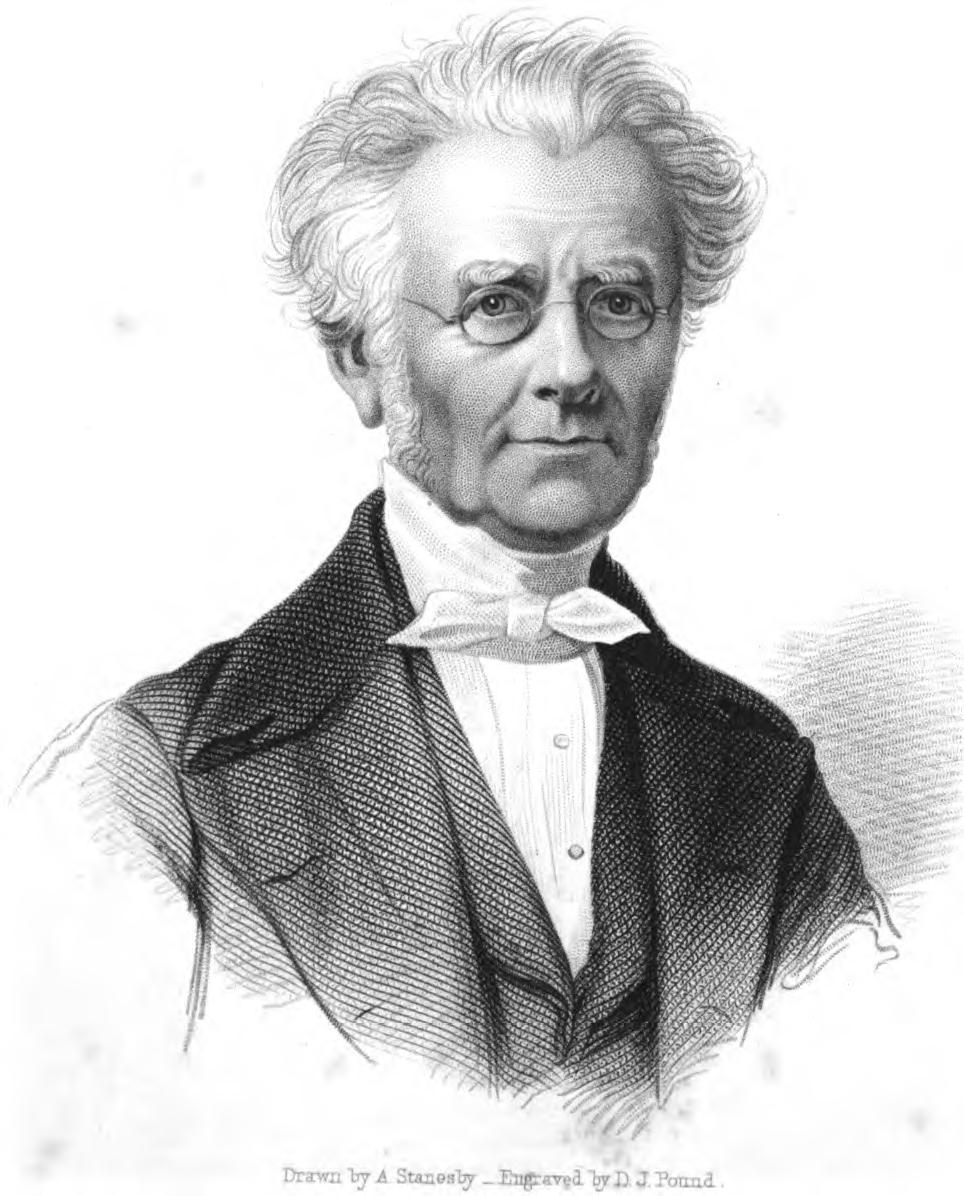
- Born: February 17, 1787; Ashted, Birmingham
- Died: November 2, 1854 (aged 67); Hastings
- Resting place: All Saints Church, Hastings
- Education: Bromsgrove
- Occupations: Writer, poet and religious tract author
- Spouses: Elizabeth Bloomer (m. 1812; died 1822) Mary Ridsdale (m. 1825)
- Children: 3 sons, 1 daughter
- Writing career
- Pen name: "Old Humphrey"
- Language: English

George Mogridge (17 February 1787 – 2 November 1854) was a 19th-century writer, poet and author of children's books and religious tracts. He is chiefly known by his pseudonym of Old Humphrey, under which name he published 46 works, but also used the pen-names "Jeremy Jaunt", "Ephraim Holding", "Peter Parley" and "Old Father Thames". He wrote approximately 200 published works, many of which are still in publication today, and at the time of his death it was estimated that over 15 million copies of his writings were in circulation.

== Biography ==
=== Early life ===
George Mogridge was born in Ashted, Birmingham, on 17 February 1787, the son of Matthias Mogridge, a canal agent. His grandfather, Anthony Mogridge, was the Vicar of Kimbolton, Worcestershire. His Uncle, John Phillips, was also a vicar, so the family had strong religious tendencies which were to influence many of George's later writings. His friend and biographer, Charles Williams, noted that George, as a child, was 'taught to occupy and amuse himself', a trait which led him, unattended, to explore a local building site, where he suffered severe injuries falling into the newly dug foundations, leaving him with a scar on his forehead which he would bear for the rest of his life.

In early childhood he attended the village Dame school, then was later enrolled at Boarcote school, Bromsgrove, where he was not happy. He taught himself to swim after witnessing a man drowning, and eventually used this skill to rescue a fellow-pupil from a similar fate.

At the age of 14 he was apprenticed to a Japanner (varnisher) in Birmingham, and eventually started his own japanning business in partnership with his brother, in Lancaster Street, Birmingham.

=== Adult life ===
In 1812 he married Elizabeth Bloomer, who bore him two sons and a daughter. Elizabeth died in 1822, and three years later he married Mary Ridsdale, by whom he had one more son. Mary authored a book, Domestic Addresses and edited several of Mogridge's works.

In 1826 Mogridge's Japanning business collapsed, and he took to writing full-time for a living. He was unable to make a sufficient living through his writing, and Mogridge fell into financial difficulties, compounded, in 1828, by a period of ill-health. By this time he had entered into a deal to write religious pamphlets for the Religious Tract Society, who agreed to provide a pension to support him through his difficulties. Years later, Queen Victoria, flattered by poems Mogridge had written in celebration of her and her husband, Prince Albert, agreed to contribute to this pension.

His contract with the Religious Tract Society necessitated a move to London, involving a long separation from his wife who remained in Birmingham, but after many months, and with financial support from friends and readers, he was able to take on a property in Kingsland, London, where his wife and family eventually joined him.

Mogridge was already a well-known and prolific writer by 1833, when he chose the pseudonym "Old Humphrey" for his authorship of a series of children's books for the Religious Tract Society. He would write 46 tracts under this name, aimed at persuading children into Christian habits and morals, and it is as "Old Humphrey" that he is best remembered.

=== Final illness and death ===
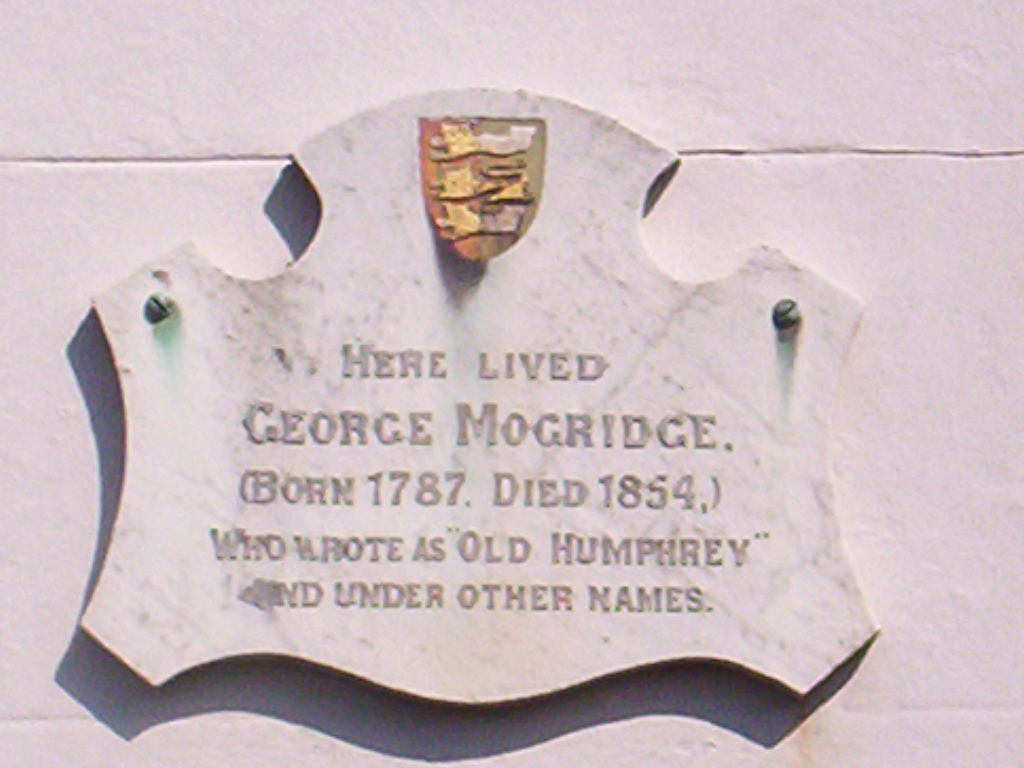
Plaque commemorating George Mogridge on the wall of his house at Hastings, Sussex

In 1851 Mogridge sprained his ankle and during his convalescence fell into a further spell of the bad health which had dogged him for much of his life. On medical advice he left London and took a house at 6 High Wickham, Hastings, Sussex, where he lived for the rest of his life, and he grew to love the town, writing Old Humphrey at Hastings during his time there. He died, with his wife at his bedside, in Hastings on 2 November 1854, and, by his own request, was buried against the wall in the graveyard of All Saints' Church, Hastings. His gravestone stresses his religious convictions. The Religious Tract Society estimated that they had sold more than 15 million copies of his works worldwide by the time he died, and many of his Tracts are still in print today.

Immediately after his death his house at Hastings became, briefly, a tourist attraction, as readers of his works travelled to Hastings to view the room where 'Old Humphrey' had died. A plaque on the wall of the house records his residence there, and a street in the Old Town area of Hastings, a short walk from his house, was named "Old Humphrey Avenue" in his honour.

Two biographies of his life appeared shortly after his death, one, particularly florid and exuberant, written by his close friend Charles Williams, the other sponsored by The Religious Tract Society.

== Literary career ==
Mogridge had begun writing poems and short articles for his own amusement while still at school. Later, during his apprenticeship years, he made the acquaintance of Samuel Jackson Pratt, a prolific and popular (though now largely forgotten) poet who lived in Colmore Row, Birmingham. Mogridge showed Pratt examples of his writings and the latter encouraged him to start writing for publication.

=== "Jeremy Jaunt" ===
In his spare time, Mogridge, encouraged by Pratt, wrote and submitted a series of letters and articles to The Birmingham and Lichfield Chronicle under the pseudonym of "Jeremy Jaunt" (supposedly an aged, bewigged man with smallpox scars, who had lived in Birmingham his entire life). These were accepted and became a weekly column called "Local Perambulations". The early columns dealt principally with the need for improvements to Birmingham, but in later years also tackled more widespread subjects including expressing support for the anti-slavery movement.

=== "Thomas Brown" ===
During his time in Birmingham, Mogridge joined with a relative in campaigning to rid the city of what he considered to be vice and immorality. A particular target was the 'obscene' ballads which were published and sold on the city streets. Mogridge's aim was to buy up every copy of the obscene ballads and destroy them, and to persuade the publishers to stop printing further copies. The publishers, naturally, refused his request, so Mogridge decided to write his own ballad, in the style and metre of the obscene ballads, but on a moral and religious topic. This led to the publication of his first Religious Tract, Thomas Brown (Full title: The Sabbath-Breaker reclaimed: or the Pleasing History of Thomas Brown, in verse). The ballad told the tale of a poor, drunken, miserable man who is brought to realise that his poverty and misery are due to his neglecting to attend church on Sundays. Thomas Brown was an instant success and sold thousands of copies; Mogridge's biographer records that one man derived his entire livelihood by singing Thomas Brown for money, non-stop, on the streets of London.

=== "Old Humphrey" ===
In 1833, The Religious Tract Society began issuing a weekly periodical, "The Weekly Visitor" and invited Mogridge to contribute "articles on a variety of familiar topics treated in a popular manner." Mogridge chose to write these under a new pen-name, "Old Humphrey". He originally intended "Old Humphrey" to be no more than a pseudonym, but with the unexpected popularity of the articles, the public were soon keen to know more about "Old Humphrey", and the author's identity became a matter of popular speculation in the press. In response Mogridge began to imbue his pseudonym with the character of an elderly, kind hearted gentleman, responding to one paper's article, "Who is Old Humphrey?" with an enigmatic description beginning,

If you see an elderly-looking man parting two passionate boys who are fighting; giving twopence to a poor girl who has by accident broken her jug, to make all right again; picking up a fallen child out of the dirt; guiding a blind man carefully across the street; or hesitating for a moment if an importunate beggar is an imposter or not and then deciding in his favour; if you see such a one, so occupied, he is not unlikely to be Old Humphrey."

The 'Old Humphrey' articles proved so popular with the public that Mogridge was eventually to write 46 articles and books under that name over a period of twenty years, including Old Humphrey's Observations and Old Humphrey's Pithy Papers on Singular Subjects. Many of 'Old Humphrey's' books were aimed at children and were popular 'prizes' at Sunday-Schools.

=== Other writings ===
Mogridge used various other pseudonyms, both male and female, in his long career, including "Uncle Adam", "Old Alan Gray", "Ephraim Holding", "Uncle Newbury", "Aunt Newbury", "Old Father Thames," "Grandfather Gregory", "Grandmamma Gilbert", "Aunt Upton", "Amos Armfield", "Godfrey Gilbert" and "Peter Parley" – the latter bringing him into conflict with an American writer, Samuel Griswold Goodrich, who also wrote under that name.

Mogridge also wrote fifty books under his own name, including The Juvenile Culprits (1829) and The Churchyard Lyricist (1832). A keen traveller and walker, he also published several travel books based on his journeys, such as Wanderings in the Isle of Wight (1846).
