= Nicholas A. Price =

American artist

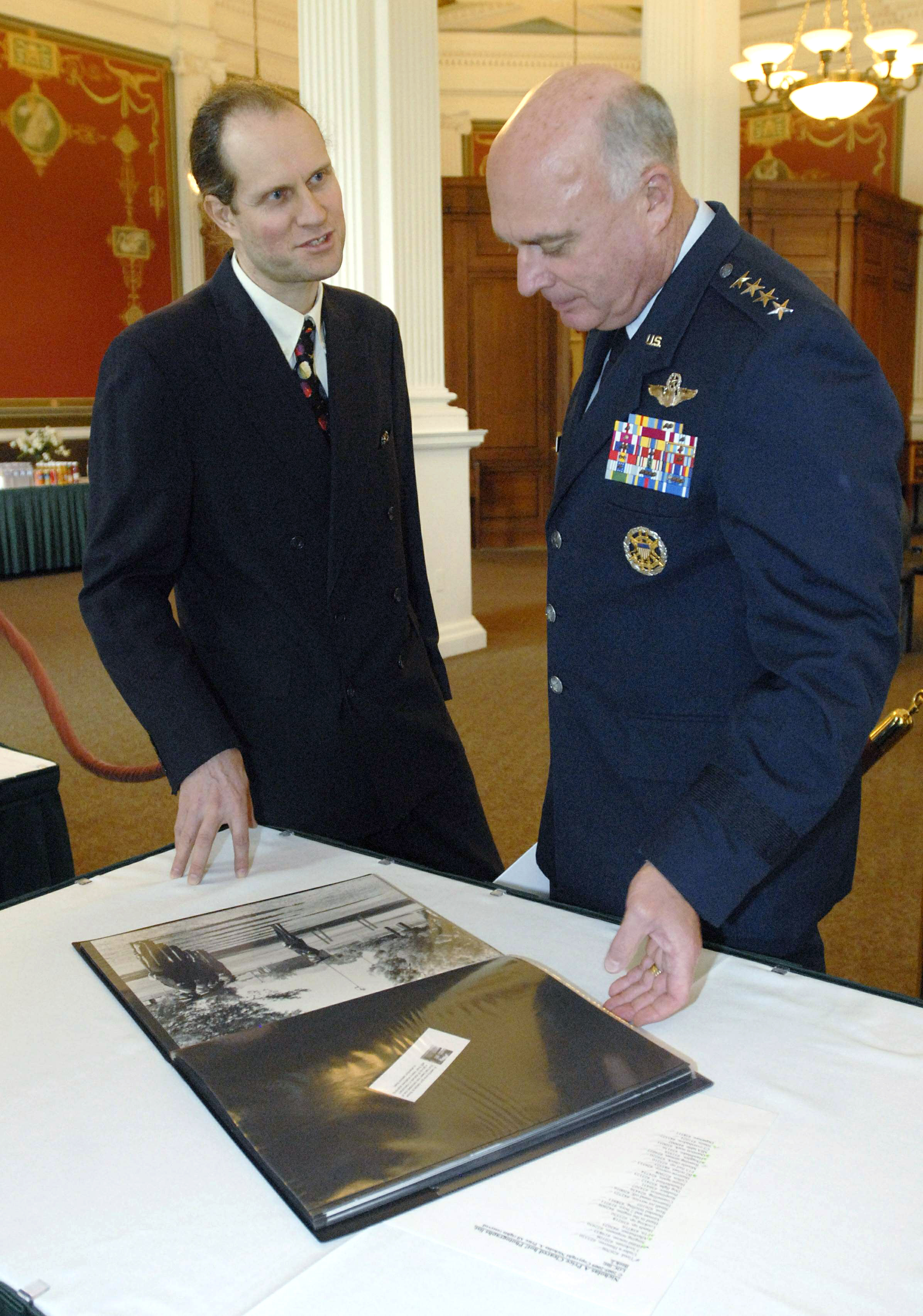
Gen. Carrol H. "Howie" Chandler discusses Air Force imagery with photographer Nicholas Price at the Library of Congress Oct. 6, 2009, in Washington, D.C. The event was the official ceremony welcoming the acquisition of 60 images from the 'Cleared Hot!' Fine Art Photography Collection of the Air Force by Nicholas Price to the library. General Chandler is the Air Force vice chief of staff. (U.S. Air Force photo/Master Sgt. Stan Parker)

'Nicholas A. Price is an American visual artist who specializes in fine art film, photography, sculpture and public art.

Price also writes poetry, children's short stories and adult fiction stories in the genres of crime thrillers and comedy.

== "Cleared Hot" ==
In 2009, the Library of Congress acquired "Cleared Hot", 60 large-format, black-and-white photographs of men and women in the U.S. Air Force, to fill a gap in the Library's visual collections related to the history of military aviation. The photos are available for viewing by researchers in the Library's Prints and Photographs Division.

"The 60 photographs create a valuable visual story for understanding the hard work and deep commitment of today’s military," said Helena Zinkham, acting chief of the Prints and Photographs Division. "This compelling photographic essay, created to honor the men and women of the Air Force, enriches the Library’s collections by providing a contemporary counterpart to our historic resources."

== Fine Art Film Photography ==
=== Fine Art Photography Commissions ===
- Cleared Hot
- Playground of The Gods
- Trick Trunk
- Partnerships With Nature
- Dam Perspective (Hoover Dam)
- Dance In Focus/Anatomy of A Ballet
- Signs of Americana
- Portraits of America

== Books for children ==
- (2017) Timed to Perfection. New York: Demy Books. ISBN 9781946522108.
- (2017) The Lazy Hour. New York: Demy Books. ISBN 9781946522122.
- (2017) Mister Second Runs Out of Time. New York: Demy Books. ISBN 9781946522146.
- (2017) The Moon Has a Big Head. New York: Demy Books. ISBN 9781946522009.
- (2017) Lilys Curl. New York: Demy Books. ISBN 9781946522023.
- (2017) The Tapeworm. New York: Demy Books. ISBN 9781946522047.
- The Hideous Child. New York: Demy Books. ISBN 9781946522061.
- (2017) Hop on Board. New York: Demy Books. ISBN 9781946522085

== Adult Fiction Books ==
He also writes adult fiction books. His book Adventures in Trichology, is a biography of Norman Baker. His other published books are;

- (2017) Hated Men. New York: Bulldog Publications. ISBN 9781946522740.
- (2018) The Unexpected Warrior. New York: Bulldog Publications. ISBN 9781946522788.
- (2018) The Unexpected Knight. New York: Bulldog Publications. ISBN 9781946522801.
- (2018) The Unexpected Return. New York: Bulldog Publications. ISBN 9781946522825

== Poetry ==
- (2011) Bridges to Manhattan. New York: Tough Tribe Publishing. ISBN 9780979839078.
- (2011) Forgotten Holiday. New York: Tough Tribe Publishing. ISBN 9780979839054.
- (2011) An Elephant in My Front Yard. New York: Tough Tribe Publishing. ISBN 9780979839023.
- (2011) Thoughts of You. New York: Tough Tribe Publishing. ISBN 9780979839030.

== Noted Commissions ==
Name of sculpture	Location	Public/Private
Upward Trends	Bank of America Plaza	Public
Silver Sail	NA Hospice	Public
The Cube	Federal and State Buildings	Public and Private
Ophelia	Exclusive Estates Development	Private
The Running Man Collection	Private Collector	Private
Chiao Teng	Public Art Exhibitions	Public and Private
The Globe	Exclusive Estates	Private
The Globe	Southshore Development	Private
Cintas Tejidas	SW Interior Design Group	Private
Urban Graffiti	Private Client Acquisition	Private
Aphrodite	Exclusive Estates Development	Private
Bishu	Public Art Exhibitions	Public
Commedia	Private Collector	Private
Pulling The Strings	Public Art Exhibitions	Public
IIuminum	Private Collector	Private
Octopoda	Private Collector	Private
