= Pitt ministry =

Pitt ministry can refer to several ministries of Great Britain and later the United Kingdom:

- Pitt–Devonshire ministry, the British government dominated by William Pitt the Elder from 1756 to 1757
- Pitt–Newcastle ministry, the British government dominated by William Pitt the Elder from 1757 to 1761
- Chatham ministry, the British government led by William Pitt the Elder as Lord Chatham from 1766 to 1768
- First Pitt ministry, the British government led by William Pitt the Younger from 1783 to 1801
- Second Pitt ministry, the British government led by William Pitt the Younger from 1804 to 1806

== See also ==
- Premiership of William Pitt (disambiguation)
