= Olive Moore =

Miriam Constance Beaumont Vaughan (1901 – 1979), better known by her pseudonym Olive Moore, was a modernist English writer best known for three well-esteemed novels: Celestial Seraglio (1929), Spleen (1930), and Fugue (1932), and for the acerbic essay collection The Apple Is Bitten Again (1934). She also produced an essay on D. H. Lawrence, entitled Further Reflections on the Death of a Porcupine, which was privately printed in 1933 and included in her essay collection. Her Collected Writings was published in 1992.

== Biography ==
Born in Hereford, Moore was acquainted with the Bloomsbury literary circles in London during her prolific years, and with the poet Hugh MacDiarmid and the radical London bookseller and publisher Charles Lahr. She briefly worked for the Daily Sketch. In the early 1920s, she married the sculptor Sava Botzaris (1894-1965). Otherwise, little is known about her life, beyond a brief autobiographic sketch in 1933. Moore claimed to be working on a novel entitled Amazon and Hero: The Drama of the Greek War for Independence, which was never published.

== Style ==
Moore has been termed "a cross between Virginia Woolf and Djuna Barnes, but with a more biting wit." Her novels make free use of modernist techniques such as stream of consciousness in their frank dealings with issues of sexuality and disability. Though considered a highly talented experimental writer, Moore's disappearance (and the rarity of published versions of her texts until the mid-1990s) has led to a relative critical neglect of her work, until recently. Cleveland Review of Books reviewed Spleen, calling it "morbid and beautiful," after Moore's resurgence in the cultural zeitgeist.
