= Colin Moon =

British author

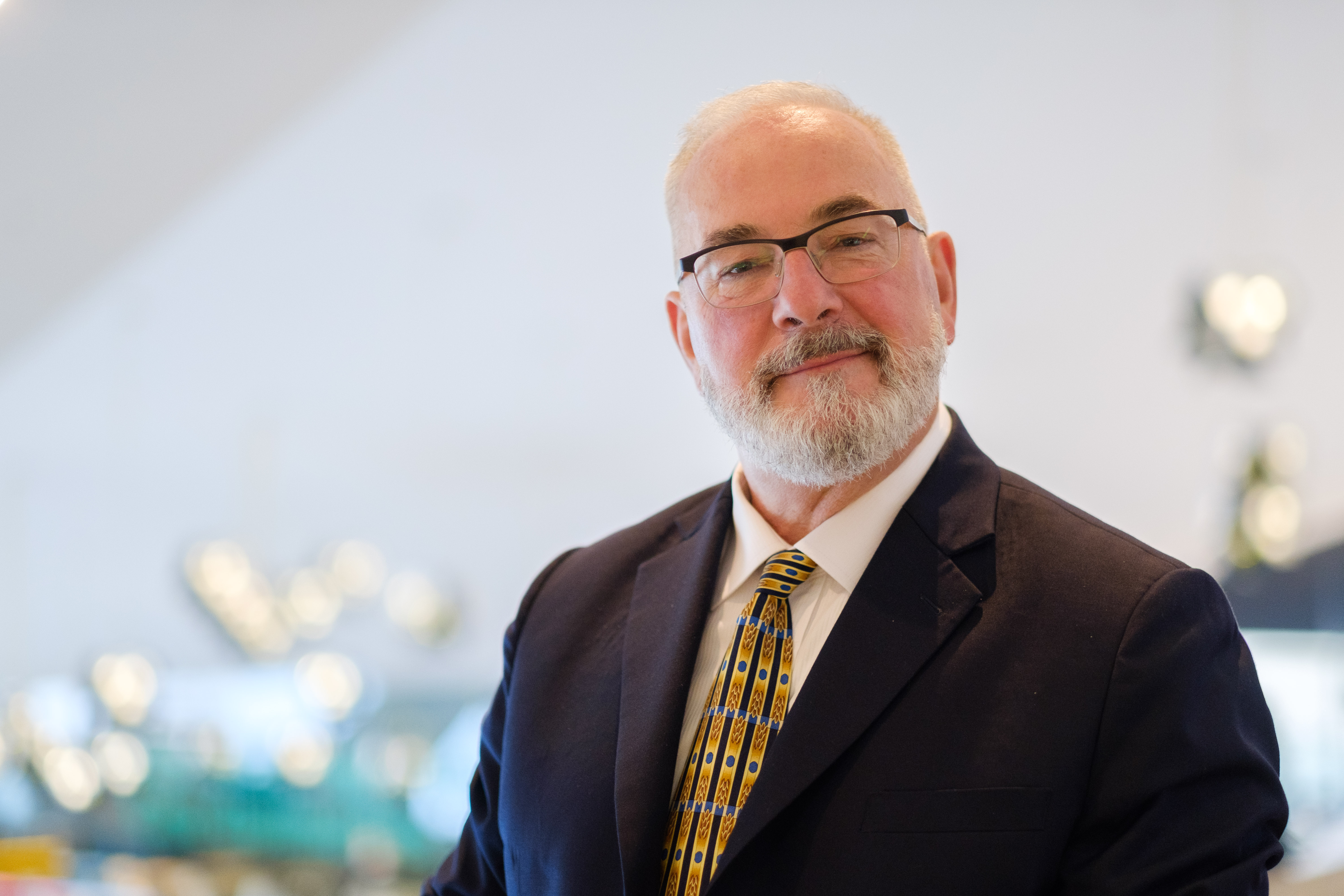
Colin Moon at the Data of Tomorrow Conference 2017

Colin Moon, born 8 November 1957 in London, is a British author.

Colin Moon moved to Malmö, Sweden in the 1980s. Since the 1990s he has been a business speaker in intercultural communication, specialising in Sweden, the Swedes and their peculiarities within a business context. Colin has also written books on telephone and mail-writing skills for business people.

Moon often hosts lectures on intercultural communication, cultural differences and global business communication. Some of his famous lectures are “Cracking the Nordic Code”, “The Swedes are strange ... and so am I” and “My colleague is a foreigner ... and so am I”.

== Bibliography ==
- Colin's lazy Dog (2004)
- Colin's e-right@work (2006/2009)
- In the secret garden of SwEden (2007)
- Puzzles and pleasure for Swedish professionals (2008)
- Sweden – the Secret Files (2001/2008)
- Swedes@meetings.se (17 May 2010)

All books are published by Mercuri Kongress, Stockholm.
