= William Pitt (ship-builder) =

English ship-builder

William Pitt (died 1840, in Malta) was an English ship-builder who was the Master Attendant at Jamaica Dockyard, and later of Malta. His amusing poem of "The Sailor's Consolation" is in many collections credited to Charles Dibdin.
