= Carex nivalis =

Scientific classification
- Kingdom: Plantae
- Clade: Tracheophytes
- Clade: Angiosperms
- Clade: Monocots
- Clade: Commelinids
- Order: Poales
- Family: Cyperaceae
- Genus: Carex
- Species: C. nivalis

Binomial name
- Carex nivalis Boott

Synonyms
- Carex cinnamomea; Carex gilesii; Carex griffithii; Carex lepus-aestatis; Carex luteobrunnea; Carex oliveri

Species of grass-like plant

Carex nivalis is a species of sedge that was first described by Francis Boott in 1845. It is found from Afghanistan to southwest China. The name has also been used as a synonym for Carex micropoda.
