= Archibald Sayce =

British Assyriologist and linguist (born 1845)

The Reverend Archibald Sayce FRAS
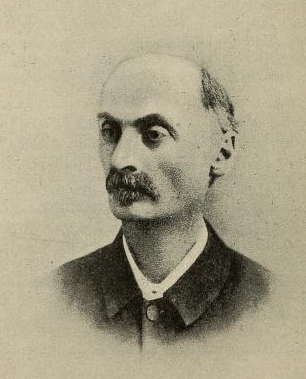
- Sayce in 1911
- Born: Archibald Henry Sayce; 25 September 1845; Shirehampton, England
- Died: 4 February 1933 (aged 87); Bath, Somerset, England
- Occupations: Assyriologist and linguist

Academic background
- Education: Grosvenor College, Bath; The Queen's College, Oxford

Academic work
- Discipline: Assyriology; Linguistics
- Institutions: University of Oxford

Archibald Henry Sayce FRAS (25 September 1845 – 4 February 1933) was a pioneer British Assyriologist and linguist, who held a chair as Professor of Assyriology at the University of Oxford from 1891 to 1919. He was able to write in at least twenty ancient and modern languages, and was known for his emphasis on the importance of archaeological and monumental evidence in linguistic research. He was a contributor to articles in the 9th, 10th and 11th editions of the Encyclopædia Britannica.

== Life ==
Sayce was born in Shirehampton, near Bristol, on 25 September 1845. Although the start of his education was delayed due to ill health he had suffered since birth, Sayce was a quick learner. When his first tutor was appointed in 1855, he was already reading works in Latin and Ancient Greek. He began his formal education at Grosvenor College shortly after his family moved to Bath in 1858. By the age of 18, he had already taught himself to read some Ancient Egyptian, Sanskrit and Hebrew and had become interested in cuneiform. He published his first academic paper, Cuneiform inscriptions of Van in 1865.

In 1865 he became a classical scholar at The Queen's College, Oxford. While a student at Oxford, Sayce became friends with Max Müller, John Rhys, John Ruskin and Henry Acland. Due to his poor health, Sayce spent time away from Oxford, and carried out his studies at home and on visits to the Pyrenees and Switzerland. Sayce achieved a first-class in Classical Moderations (Greek and Latin) in 1866 and in Literae Humaniores (Philosophy and Ancient History) in 1868, and was elected to a vacant Fellowship in the same year.

In 1869, Sayce was appointed a lecturer at Queen's College. He was ordained a priest in the Church of England in 1870. Ongoing problems with his sight almost led to the end of his Oxford career and Sayce spent much of his time travelling Europe. It was only from 1874, when he came under the supervision of ophthalmologist Richard Liebreich, that Sayce was able to continue his academic career. In the same year he was appointed as the university's representative in the Old Testament Revision Company. Sayce also began to deliver lectures to the Nineveh Society of Biblical Archaeology and contributed to The Times and the New York Independent. In 1876 Sayce was appointed the Deputy Professor of Comparative Philology, a role shared with the continuing Professor, Max Müller, who wanted to reduce his duties.

From 1872, Sayce spent most of his summers travelling for his health and in search of new texts. In 1879 he resigned from his tutorship at Oxford to dedicate his time to his research and exploring the near East. In 1881, Sayce was one of the first scholars to examine the Siloam Inscription, which he described in the Palestine Exploration Fund Quarterly. Sayce resigned his professorship in 1890 and briefly moved to Egypt, where he was instrumental in the reopening of the Museum of Cairo in 1891. In 1891, Sayce returned to Oxford to become the university's first Professor of Assyriology.

Lectures were his favourite vehicle for publication, and he published his Hibbert Lectures on Babylonian religion in 1887. Sayce was also the Gifford Lecturer, 1900–1902; and Rhind Lecturer, 1906.

Sayce was a founding member of the Society of Biblical Archaeology, which he presided from 1898 until it was absorbed into the Royal Asiatic Society in 1919. He was also an active member of the Royal Asiatic Society from 1874 and a founding member of the Society for the Promotion of Hellenic Studies.

After his retirement in 1915, Sayce continued to write and spent his time in Edinburgh, Oxford and Egypt. By the end of his life, Sayce was considered to be an amateur rather than a specialist and was criticized for his lack of intellectual penetration and outdated opposition to the work of continental orientalists. In 1923, he published Reminiscences, an account of his life and his numerous travels. At the time of his death he was working on a translation of inscriptions discovered at Ras Shamra. Sayce died on 4 February 1933 in Bath.

== Research ==
=== Sumerian and Akkadian languages ===
Sayce's early research examined Sumerian and Akkadian languages. His article An Accadian Seal (1870), includes the discovery of many of the linguistic principles of Sumerian. Sayce's An Assyrian grammar for comparative purposes (1872), drew attention from established Assyriologists to the 'new' language. In 1874, Sayce published his paper, The Astronomy and Astrology of the Babylonians, one of the first articles to translate astronomical cuneiform texts.

=== Science of language ===
Sayce is also seen by some as one of founding fathers of the 'Reform Movement' in linguistic research at the end of the 19th century. His two notable works, Introduction to the Science of Language (1879), and The Principles of Comparative Philology (1880), introduced audiences to the changing continental linguistic trends in the late 19th and early 20th centuries. The books challenged the current thinking in comparative philology and the importance of what Sayce termed the principle of analogy.

=== Hittite language ===
In the late 1870s, Sayce moved away from his Sumerian studies and concentrated upon Indo-European languages. He theorized that the pseudo-sesostris rock carvings in Asia Minor, such as the Karabel relief which had been historically attributed to the Egyptians, were actually created by another pre-Greek culture. In 1876 he speculated that the hieroglyphs in inscriptions discovered at Hamath in Syria, were not related to Assyrian or Egyptian scripts but came from another culture he identified as the Hittites. In 1879, Sayce further theorized that reliefs and inscriptions at Karabel, İvriz, Bulgarmaden, Carchemish, Alaca Höyük, and Yazilikaya were created by the Hittites. His hypothesis was confirmed when he visited some of the sites on a tour of the Near East in the same year. On his return to England, Sayce presented a lecture to the Society of Biblical Archaeology in London, where he announced that the Hittites where a much more influential culture than previously thought with their own art and language. Sayce concluded that the Hittite hieroglyphic system was predominantly a syllabary, that is, its symbols stood for a phonetic syllable. There were too many different signs for a system, that was alphabetical and yet there were too few for it to be a set of ideographs. That very sign standing for the divinity had appeared on the stones of Hamath and other places, always in the form of a prefix of an indecipherable group of hieroglyphics naming the deities. This led Sayce to conclude that by finding the name of one of these deities with the help of another language endowed with similar pronunciation, one might analyse the conversion of the aforesaid name in Hittite hieroglyphics. Also, he stated that the keys to be obtained through that process might in turn be applied to other parts of a Hittite inscription where the same sign were to occur.

Sayce dreamed of finding a Hittite Rosetta Stone to help with his research. Sayce attempted to translate a short Hittite hieroglyphic inscription found with a cuneiform text on a silver disk featuring a representation of the Hittite king, Tarkondemos. He and William Wright also identified the ruins at Boghazkoy with Hattusa, the capital of a Hittite Empire that stretched from the Aegean Sea to the banks of the Euphrates.

Sayce published his research on the Hittites in The Hittites: The Story of a Forgotten Empire in 1888. Sayce produced many studies on the Hittites and their language, but they were criticised by fellow scholars as his work did not apply Historical criticism, and his attempts to decipher the Hittite hieroglyphics were also unsuccessful.

=== Egyptology ===
From the early 1880s, Sayce spent most of his winters in Egypt due to his poor health, and became interested in the archaeology of the region. Sayce was friends with Flinders Petrie and worked on cuneiform inscriptions discovered by Petrie at Tel el Amarna. He worked at El Kab in Egypt with Somers Clarke in the 1900s. In his seasonal winter digs in Egypt he always hired a well-furnished boat on the Nile to accommodate his travelling library, which also enabled him to offer tea to visiting Egyptologists like the young American James Henry Breasted and his wife.

== Bibliography ==
=== Books ===
- Sayce (1865), Fresh light from the ancient monuments : a sketch of the most striking confirmations of the Bible, from recent discoveries in Egypt, Palestine, Assyria, Babylonia, Asia Minor, By-paths of Bible Knowledge, vol. III, London, United Kingdom: Religious Tract Society (2nd Edition, Religious Tract Society, 1884)(7th Edition, 1892)
- Sayce (1872), The origin of Semitic civilisation, chiefly upon philological evidence, London, United Kingdom: Harrison & Sons
- Sayce (1872), An Assyrian grammar for comparative purposes, London, United Kingdom: Trübner & Co
- Sayce (1874), The principles of comparative philology, London, United Kingdom: Trübner & Co (4th Edition, Scribner, 1893)
- Sayce (1875), Archaic classics. An elementary grammar; with full syllabary and progressive reading book, of the Assyrian language, in the cuneiform type, London, United Kingdom: Samuel Bagster
- Sayce (1876), A lecture on the study of comparative philology delivered November 13, 1876, Oxford, United Kingdom: James Parker & Co
- Sayce (1876), Lectures upon the Assyrian language, and syllabary: delivered to the students of the archaic classes, London, United Kingdom: Samuel Bagster
- Sayce (1877), Babylonian literature : lectures delivered at the Royal institution, London, United Kingdom: Samuel Bagster
- Sayce (1877), An elementary grammar: with full syllabary and progressive reading book, of the Assyrian language, in the cuneiform type, London, United Kingdom: Samuel Bagster
- Sayce (1880), "Introduction to the science of language", Nature, 22 (551), London, United Kingdom: C Kegan & Paul: 49–52, Bibcode:1880Natur..22...49K, doi:10.1038/022049a0, S2CID 4108560 (Volume I, 1880, Volume II (1st ed.), 1880), (Volume I, K. Paul, Trench & Co., 1883, Volume II (2nd ed.), K. Paul, Trench & Co., 1883), (Volume I, 1890, Volume II (3rd ed.), 1890),(Volume I (4th ed.), 1900)
- Appleton; Sayce (1881), Dr Appleton : his life and literary relics, London, United Kingdom: Trübner & Co
- Sayce (1881), The ancient empires of the east; Herodotos I-III, London, United Kingdom: Macmillan & Co
- Sayce (1881), The monuments of the Hittites. And The bilingual Hittite and cuneiform inscription of Tarkondêmos
- Sayce (1885), Assyria : its princes, priests, and people, By-Paths of Biblical Knowledge, vol. VII, London, United Kingdom: Religious Tract Society
- Sayce (1885), An introduction to the books of Ezra, Nehemiah and Esther, London, United Kingdom: Religious Tract Society (3rd Edition, 1889)
- Sayce (1887), Lectures on the origin and growth of religion as illustrated by the religion of the ancient Babylonians, The Hibbert Lectures, London, United Kingdom: Williams & Norgate
- Sayce, ed. (1889), Records of the past : being English translations of the ancient monuments of Egypt and Western Asia, London, United Kingdom: Samuel Bagster (Volume I, 1889, Volume II, 1889, Volume III, 1889, Volume IV, 1889, Volume V, 1889, Volume VI, 1892)
- Sayce (1889), The life and times of Isaiah : as illustrated by contemporary monuments, By-Paths of Biblical Knowledge, vol. XIII, London, United Kingdom: Religious Tract Society
- Sayce (1890), The Hittites : the story of a forgotten Empire, By-Paths of Biblical Knowledge, vol. XII, London, United Kingdom: Religious Tract Society
- Sayce (1891), The races of the Old Testament, By-Paths of Biblical Knowledge, vol. XVI, London, United Kingdom: Religious Tract Society
- Sayce (1893), Social Life Among the Assyrians and Babylonians, By-Paths of Biblical Knowledge, vol. XVIII, London, United Kingdom: Religious Tract Society
- Sayce (1894), The "higher criticism" and the verdict of the monuments, London, United Kingdom: Society for Promoting Christina Knowledge
- Sayce (1894), A primer of Assyriology, Present Day Primers, London, United Kingdom: The Religious Tract Society
- Sayce (1895), Patriarchal Palestine, London, United Kingdom: Society for Promoting Christian Knowledge
- Sayce (1895), The Egypt of the Hebrews and Herodotos, London, United Kingdom: Rivington, Percical & Co.
- Sayce (1897), The early history of the Hebrews, London, United Kingdom: Rivingtons
- Sayce (1899), Early Israel and the Surrounding Nations, London, United Kingdom: SERVICE & PATON
- Sayce (1900), Babylonians and Assyrians, Life and Customs, London, United Kingdom: John C. Nimmo
- Sayce (1902), The religions of ancient Egypt and Babylonia; the Gifford lectures on the ancient Egyptian and Babylonian conception of the divine delivered in Aberdeen, London, United Kingdom: T & T Clark
- Sayce (1907), The archæology of the cuneiform inscriptions, London, United Kingdom: Society for Promoting Christian Knowledge, (2nd edition (revised), 1908)
- Sayce (1923), Reminiscences, London, United Kingdom: Macmillan & Co

=== Articles ===
- Sayce (1865). "Cuneiform inscriptions of Van". The Journal of the Royal Asiatic Society of Great Britain and Ireland. XIV (3). Cambridge University Press.
- Sayce (1871). "An Accadian Seal". The Journal of Philology. 3: 1–50. hdl:2027/mdp.39015039346922.
- Sayce (1873). "The Accadian numerals". Zeitschrift der Deutschen Morgenländischen Gesellschaft. 27 (4): 696–702. JSTOR 43360719.
- Sayce (1874), "Preface", in von Bunsen (ed.), The Chronology of the Bible Connected with Contemporaneous Events in the History of Babylonians, Assyrians and Egyptians, London, United Kingdom: Longmans, Green & Co
- Sayce (1875). "The Astronomy of the Babylonians". Nature. 12 (3). Cambridge University Press: 489–491. Bibcode:1875Natur..12..489S. doi:10.1038/012489a0.
- Sayce (1876), "The results of the Examination-System at Oxford", in Pattison (ed.), Essays on the endowment of research, London: Henry S King & Co, pp. 124–148
- Sayce (1876). "The Dual of the Assyrian Perfect". Zeitschrift der Deutschen Morgenländischen Gesellschaft. 30 (2): 310–312. JSTOR 43366250.
- Sayce (1876). "The Jelly Fish Theory of Language". The Contemporary Review. 27 (April): 713–723.
- Sayce (1877). "The Tenses of the Assyrian Verb". The Journal of the Royal Asiatic Society of Great Britain and Ireland. 9 (1). Cambridge University Press: 22–58. doi:10.1017/S0035869X00016762. JSTOR 25207739. S2CID 164115616.
- Sayce (1877). "On the Hamathmite Inscriptions". Transactions of the Society of Biblical Archaeology. 5: 22–32.
- Sayce (1878). "The Art of Prehistoric Greece". The Academy. 13: 195–197.
- Sayce (1878). "The Phoenician of Ancient Greece". The Contemporary Review. 34 (December): 60–76.
- Bosanquet; Sayce (1879). "Preliminary Paper on the Babylonian Astronomy". Monthly Notices of the Royal Astronomical Society. 39 (8). Royal Astronomical Society: 454–461. doi:10.1093/mnras/39.8.454a.
- Sayce (1879). "Accadian Phonology". Transactions of the Philological Society. 17 (1): 123–142. doi:10.1111/j.1467-968X.1879.tb01071.x.
- Sayce (1879). "The Origins of Early Art in Asia Minor". The Academy. 36: 124.
- Bosanquet; Sayce (1880). "Babylonian Astronomy". Monthly Notices of the Royal Astronomical Society. 40 (9). Royal Astronomical Society: 565–578. doi:10.1093/mnras/40.9.565.
- Sayce (1880). "Notes from Journeys in the Troad and Lydia". The Journal of Hellenic Studies. 1: 75–93. doi:10.2307/623615. JSTOR 623615. S2CID 162988348.
- Sayce (1880), "Inscriptions found at Hissarlik", in Schliemann, Heinrich (ed.), Ilios; the city and country of the Trojans, New York: Harper & Brothers, pp. 691–705
- Ramsay; Sayce (1880). "On Some Pamphylian Inscriptions". The Journal of Hellenic Studies. 1: 242–259. doi:10.2307/623623. JSTOR 623623. S2CID 162368873.
- Sayce (1882). "The Cuneiform Inscriptions of Van, Deciphered and Translated". The Journal of the Royal Asiatic Society of Great Britain and Ireland. 14 (4). Cambridge University Press: 377–732. doi:10.1017/S0035869X00018335. JSTOR 25196936. S2CID 162467267.
- Sayce (1882). "The Monuments of the Hittites". Transactions of the Society of Biblical Archaeology. 7: 248–293.
- Sayce (1884). "The Cuneiform Tablets of Kappadokia". Proceedings of the Society of Biblical Archaeology. 6: 17–25.
- Sayce (1882). "The Bilingual Hittite and Cuneiform Inscriptions at Tarkondemos". Transactions of the Society of Biblical Archaeology. 7: 294–308.
- Sayce (1884), "Preface", in Schliemann (ed.), Troja : results of the latest researches and discoveries on the site of Homer's Troy, London: John Murray
- Sayce (1887). "Balaam's Prophecy (Numbers XXIV, 17-24) and the God Sheth". Hebraica. 4 (1). The University of Chicago Press: 1–6. doi:10.1086/368977. JSTOR 527147.
- Sayce (1887). "The Origin of the Augment". Transactions of the Philological Society. 20 (1): 652–655. doi:10.1111/j.1467-968X.1887.tb00117.x.
- Sayce (1888). "The White Race of Palestine". Nature. 38 (979). The University of Chicago Press: 321–322. Bibcode:1888Natur..38..321S. doi:10.1038/038321a0.
- Sayce (1889), "Chapter 5: The Papyri", in Petrie (ed.), Hawara, Biahmu, and Arsinoe, London: Field & Tuer
- Sayce (1889). "Polytheism in Primitive Israel". The Jewish Quarterly Review. 2 (1). University of Pennsylvania Press: 321–322. doi:10.2307/1450128. JSTOR 1450128.
- Sayce (1889). "Ancient Arabia". Science. 14 (358). American Association for the Advancement of Science: 406–408. doi:10.1126/science.ns-14.358.406. JSTOR 1764098. PMID 17800293.
- Sayce (1890), "The Witness of Ancient Monuments to the Old Testament Scriptures", Historical evidences of the Old Testament, New York: American Tract Society, pp. 5–56
- Sayce (1890). "Jewish Tax-Gatherers at Thebes in the Age of the Ptolemies". The Jewish Quarterly Review. 2 (4). University of Pennsylvania Press: 400–405. doi:10.2307/1450164. JSTOR 1450164.
- Sayce (1890). "Blessed Be Abram of the Most High God". Hebraica. 6 (4). The University of Chicago Press: 312–314. doi:10.1086/369101. JSTOR 527547.
- Sayce (1891), "Chapter 9: The Greek Papyri", in Petrie (ed.), Illahun, Kahun and Gurob : 1889-1890, London: David Nutt
- Sayce (1891). "Modern Name of Ur of the Chaldees". The Journal of the Royal Asiatic Society of Great Britain and Ireland (July). Cambridge University Press: 479. JSTOR 25197062.
- Sayce (1892). "The New Bilingual Hittite Inscription". The Journal of the Royal Asiatic Society of Great Britain and Ireland (April). Cambridge University Press: 369–370. JSTOR 25197094.
- Sayce (1893). "The Cuneiform Inscriptions of Van. Part IV". The Journal of the Royal Asiatic Society of Great Britain and Ireland (Jan). Cambridge University Press: 1–39. JSTOR 25197129.
- Sayce (1894). "The Cuneiform Inscriptions of Van. Part V". The Journal of the Royal Asiatic Society of Great Britain and Ireland (Oct). Cambridge University Press: 691–732. JSTOR 25197227.

Sayce also wrote a number of articles in the Encyclopædia Britannica, 9th edition (1875–89) and 10th edition (1902-03), including on Babylon, Babylonia and Assyria, and Wilhelm von Humboldt; Encyclopædia Britannica Eleventh Edition (1911), including on Assur (city), Assur-Bani-Pal, Babylon, Babylonia and Assyria, Belshazzar, Berossus, Caria, Ecbatana, Elam, Esar-haddon, Grammar, Gyges, Karl Wilhelm von Humboldt, Kassites, Laodicea, Lycia, Lydia, Persepolis (in part), Sardanapalus, Sargon, Sennacherib, Shalmaneser, Sippara, and Susa.

=== Editorials ===
- Smith (1878), Sayce (ed.), History of Sennacherib: Translated from the Cuneiform Inscriptions, London: Williams & Norgate
- Smith (1880), Sayce (ed.), The Chaldean account of Genesis, London: Sampson Lowe, Marston, Searle, and Rivington
- Vaux (1893), Sayce (ed.), Persia from the earliest period to the Arab conquest, London: Society for Promoting Christian Knowledge
- Maspero (1894), Sayce (ed.), The dawn of civilization : Egypt and Chaldæa, London: Society for Promoting Christian Knowledge

== Primary sources ==
- A collection of letters by Sayce are held in the Emory University Archives (Manuscript Collection No. 264).
- A collection of Sayce's notes, photographs, squeezes, correspondence, and offprints are held by the Griffith Institute (Collection Sayce MSS)
