= Risdon =

Risdon is a surname and also a first name, and may refer to:

Given name

- Risdon Beazley (1904–1979), British businessman

Surname

- Dustin Risdon (born 1981), Canadian professional golfer
- Elisabeth Risdon (1887–1958) English film actress
- Josh Risdon (born 1992), Australian footballer
- Tristram Risdon (c. 1580–1640), English antiquarian, topographer, historian of Devon, and author
- Wilfred Risdon (1896–1967), British political organiser and antivivisection campaigner

See also

- James Risdon Bennett (1809–1891), English physician
- Risdon Darracott (1717-1759), English independent minister
- Risdon family
