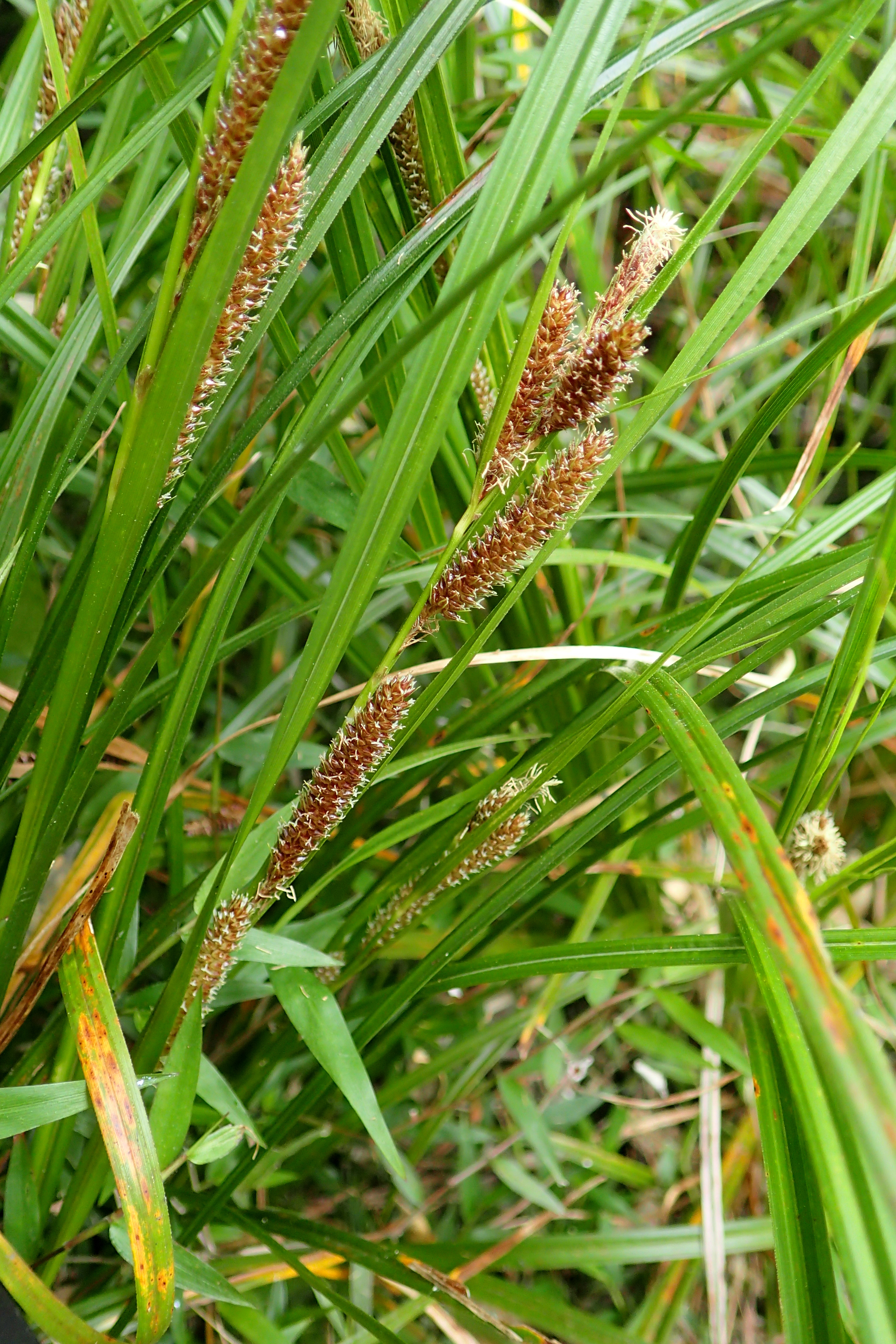

Scientific classification
- Kingdom: Plantae
- Clade: Tracheophytes
- Clade: Angiosperms
- Clade: Monocots
- Clade: Commelinids
- Order: Poales
- Family: Cyperaceae
- Genus: Carex
- Species: C. lambertiana

Binomial name
- Carex lambertiana Boott

= Carex lambertiana =

Species of grass-like plant

Carex lambertiana is a species of sedge that was first described by Francis Boott in 1853.
