= Carex discolor =

Carex discolor can refer to the following plant species:

- Carex discolor Reinw. ex de Vriese, a synonym of Carex appressa R.Br.
- Carex discolor Boeckeler, a synonym of Carex conica Boott var. conica
- Carex discolor F.Nyl., a synonym of Carex salina Wahlenb. var. salina
