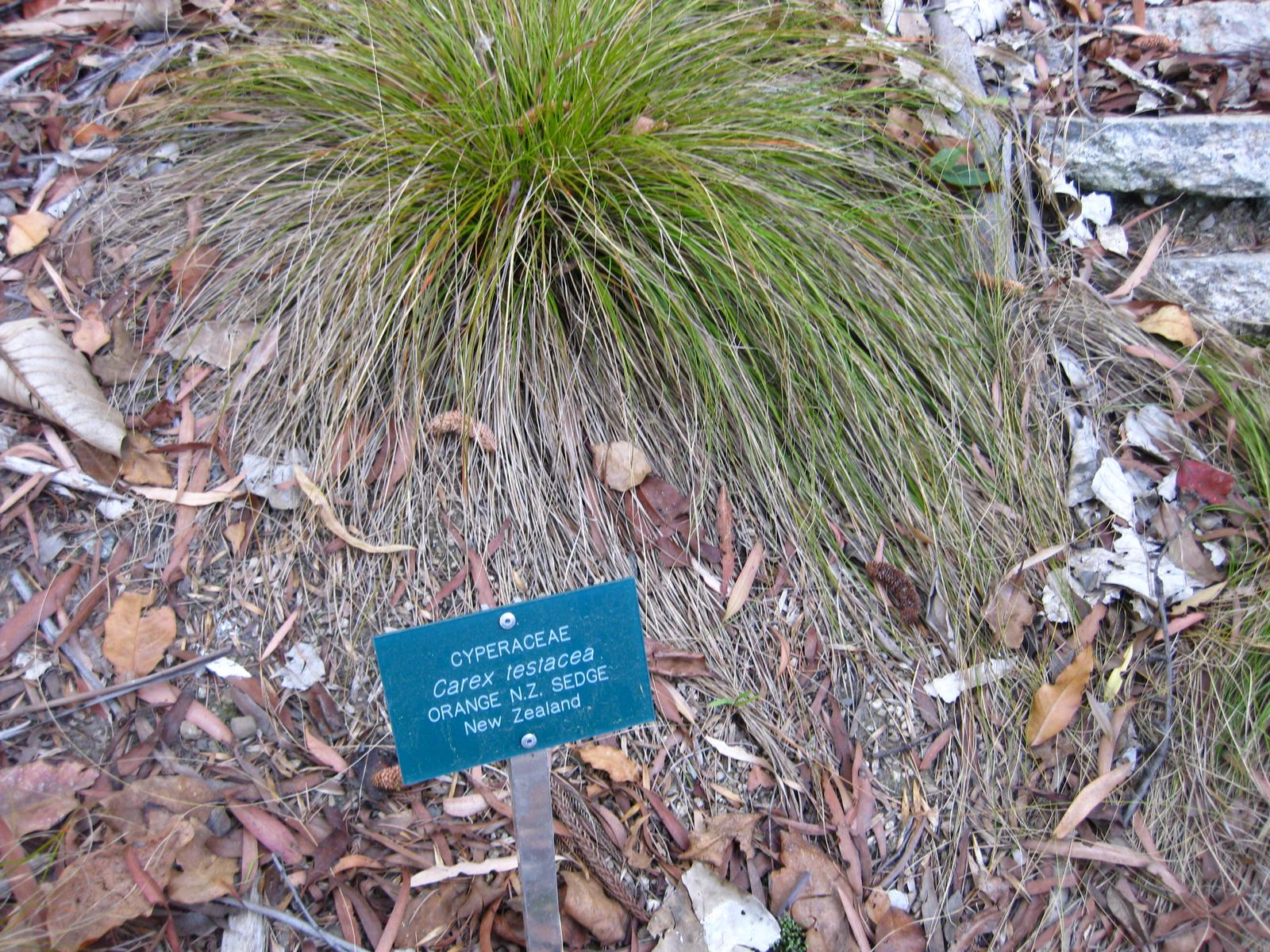
- In summer leaves are olive-green...
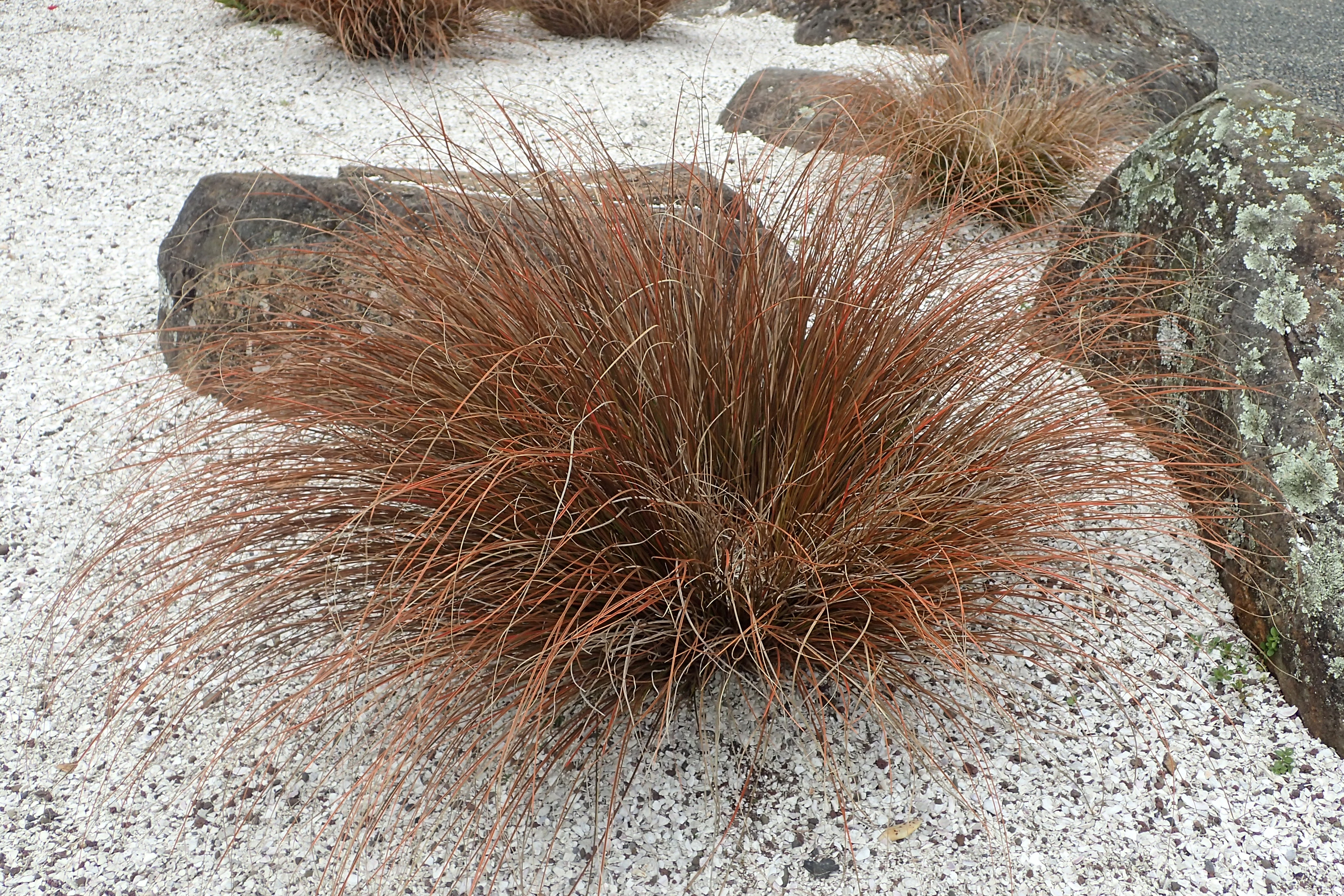
- ...and in winter they turn coppery-orange.

Scientific classification
- Kingdom: Plantae
- Clade: Tracheophytes
- Clade: Angiosperms
- Clade: Monocots
- Clade: Commelinids
- Order: Poales
- Family: Cyperaceae
- Genus: Carex
- Species: C. testacea

Binomial name
- Carex testacea Sol. ex Boott

= Carex testacea =

Species of flowering plant

Carex testacea, the orange New Zealand sedge, is a species of flowering plant in the family Cyperaceae, native to New Zealand. Prized for its colourful foliage, which provides both summer and winter interest, it is widely available commercially.
