= Carex amicta =

Scientific classification
- Kingdom: Plantae
- Clade: Tracheophytes
- Clade: Angiosperms
- Clade: Monocots
- Clade: Commelinids
- Order: Poales
- Family: Cyperaceae
- Genus: Carex
- Species: C. amicta

Binomial name
- Carex amicta Boott

Species of grass-like plant

Carex amicta is a species of sedge that was first formally named by Francis Boott in 1867. It is native to South America, from Venezuela to Peru.
