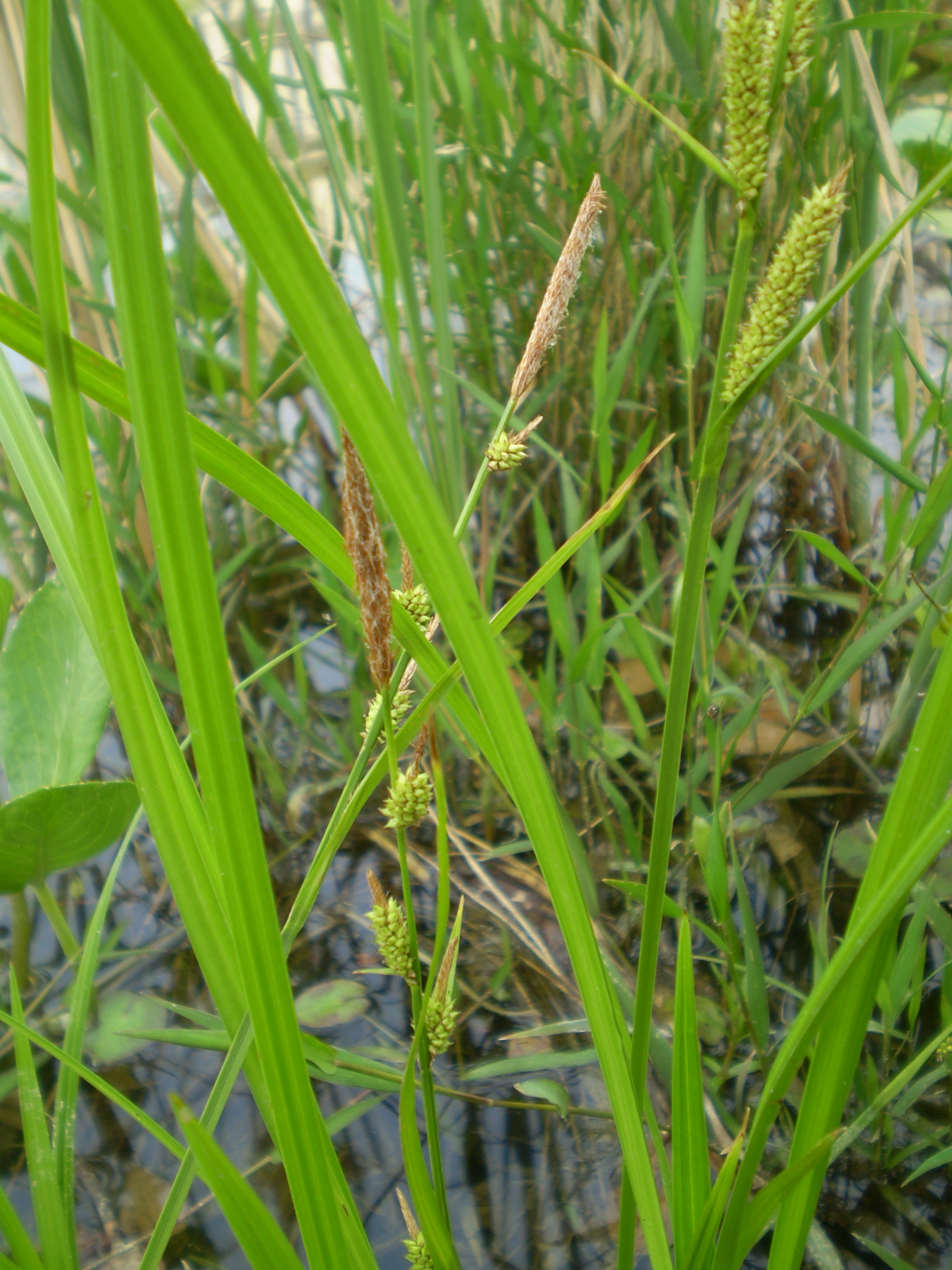
- Carex dispalata in a wet area
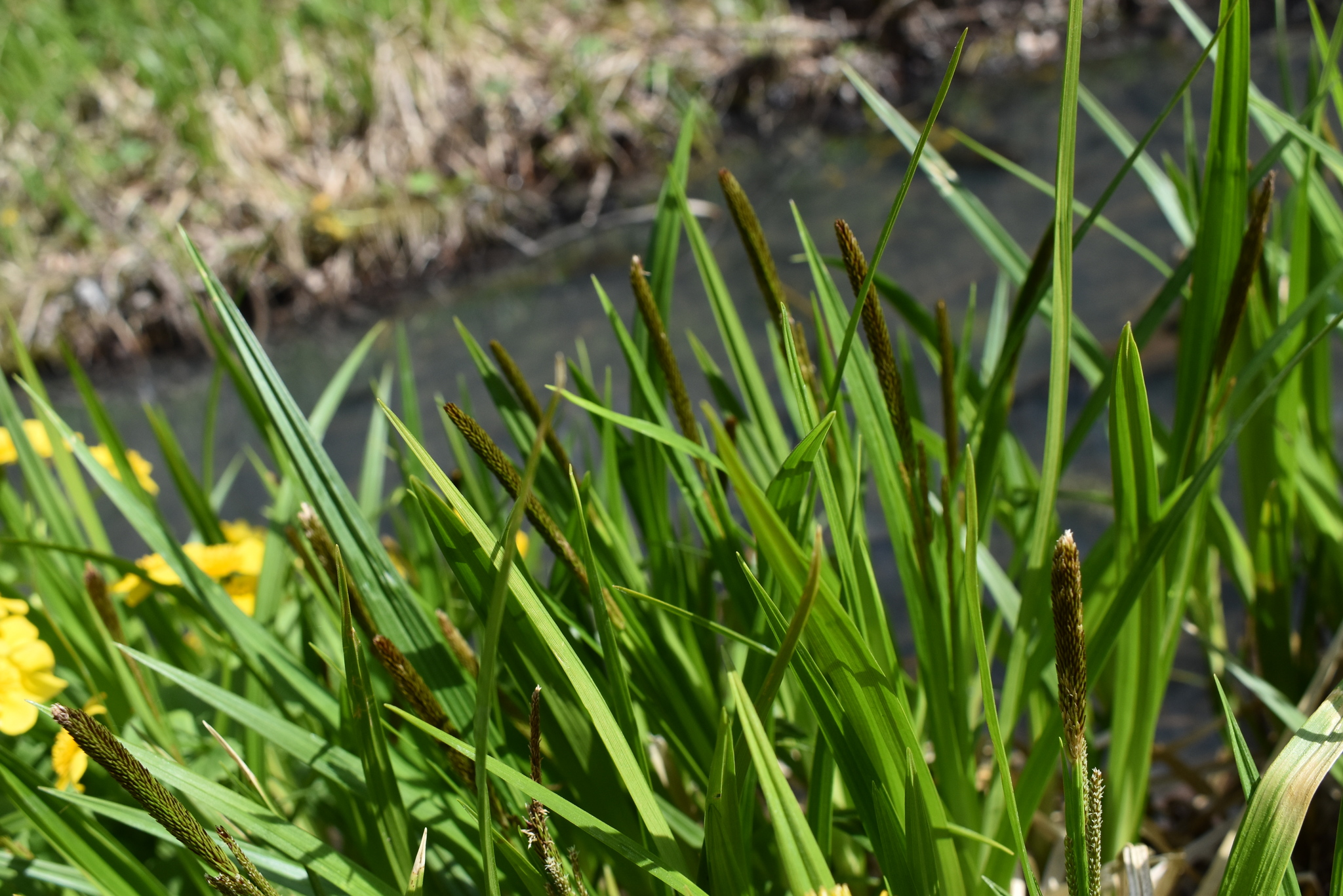
- North of Vladivostok

Scientific classification
- Kingdom: Plantae
- Clade: Embryophytes
- Clade: Tracheophytes
- Clade: Angiosperms
- Clade: Monocots
- Clade: Commelinids
- Order: Poales
- Family: Cyperaceae
- Genus: Carex
- Species: C. dispalata

Binomial name
- Carex dispalata Boott

Synonyms
- Carex coronata H.Lév.; Carex dispalata var. costata Kük.; Carex dispalata var. niigatensis Franch. & Sav.; Carex persistens var. takeuchii Ohwi; Carex pollens C.B.Clarke; Carex pollens var. angustior C.B.Clarke; Carex subanceps Boeckeler

= Carex dispalata =

Species of flowering plant

Carex dispalata is a species of flowering plant in the sedge family Cyperaceae. It is native to Nepal, Inner Mongolia, north-central and southeastern China, Manchuria, the Korean peninsula, Primorsky Krai, Sakhalin, the Kuril Islands, and Japan. A clumping rhizomatous perennial reaching 40 to 80 cm (16 to 31 in), it is found in wet habitats such as riversides, pond margins, ditches, and marshes at elevations from 500 to 2,900 m (1,600 to 9,500 ft). In Japan it is informally cultivated and used to make bedding and straw hats.

== Subtaxa ==
The following subspecies are accepted:

- Carex dispalata subsp. dispalata – entire range, except Nepal
- Carex dispalata subsp. laxiflorens T.Koyama – Nepal
