= Ernest Protheroe =

English author of fiction and non-fiction

Ernest Hanley Protheroe FSZ
- Born: 1866
- Died: 1929 (aged 62–63)
- Occupations: Teacher, author
- Spouse: Alice Chatwin
- Writing career
- Subjects: Boys books; railways; biography; natural history

Ernest Hanley Protheroe (1866–1929), was a teacher and prolific author of fiction and non-fiction.

== Biography ==
Protheroe was a teacher and became a prolific author, sometimes writing under various pen names. during the First World War he wrote some patriotic biographies including Lord Kitchener and Edith Cavell.

He was known to have lived in Wimbledon and Hyde, Greater Manchester.

Protheroe died in 1929.

== Personal life ==
Protheroe and his wife Alice had three sons, Alan, Cyril and Geoffrey, and two daughters, Marjorie and Phyllis.

== Bibliography ==
A selection of Prothroe's work includes:

- A commercial geography of the British empire. 1903. OL 7196343M.
- The dominion of man. 1906.
- In Empire's Cause. 1908.
- The handy natural history. London: Religious Tract Society. 1909. OCLC 819398604.
- The handy natural history. Boston: The Gorham Press. 1910. OL 7188868M.
- New illustrated natural history of the world. 1910. OL 14030584M.
- Every boy's book of railways and steamships. London: Religious Tract Society. 1911. OCLC 315073103. OL 24532472M.
- The British navy : its making and its meaning. London, New York: G. Routledge & Sons, Ltd., E.P. Dutton & Co. 1914. OCLC 7863189. OL 414896W.
- The railways of the world (1 ed.). London, New York: G. Routledge & Sons, Ltd., E.P. Dutton & Co. 1914. OCLC 3222149. OL 7201905M.
- Noble Woman The Life-Story of Edith Cavell. 1916a. OCLC 747742308.
- Lord Kitchener. 1916b.
- The book of ships. 1920.
- A book about ships. 1922.
- The sister Crusoes. 1925.
- A book about the romance of mining. 1927.
- Earl Haig. 1928.
- A book about aircraft. 1928.

== Sources and further reading ==
- Holland, Steve (1 February 2018). Forgotten Authors. Vol. 2. Independently published. ISBN 978-1977064363. Ernest Protheroe.
