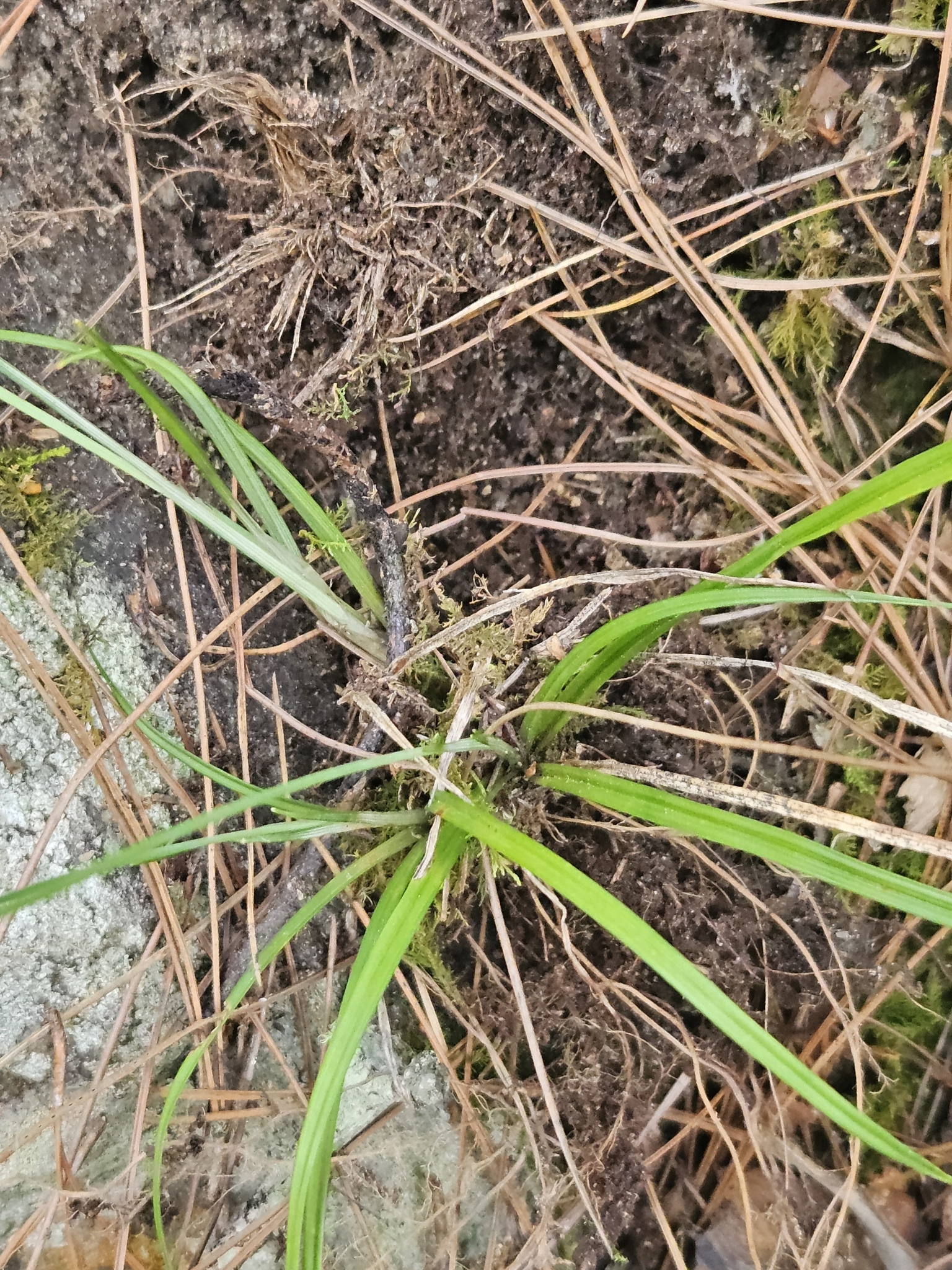
- C. m. ssp. takasagoana in Taiwan

Scientific classification
- Kingdom: Plantae
- Clade: Tracheophytes
- Clade: Angiosperms
- Clade: Monocots
- Clade: Commelinids
- Order: Poales
- Family: Cyperaceae
- Genus: Carex
- Species: C. manca

Binomial name
- Carex manca Boott

Synonyms
- Carex longqishanensis S.Yun Liang; Carex takasagoana Akiyama; Carex wichurae Boeckeler

= Carex manca =

Species of plant

Carex manca is a species of sedge that was first described by Francis Boott in 1861. It is found in south-eastern China and Taiwan.

== Taxonomy ==
There are two subspecies recognised:

- Carex manca subsp. manca Boott
- Carex manca subsp. takasagoana (Akiyama) T.Koyama
