= James Bennett (minister) =

British minister (1774–1862)

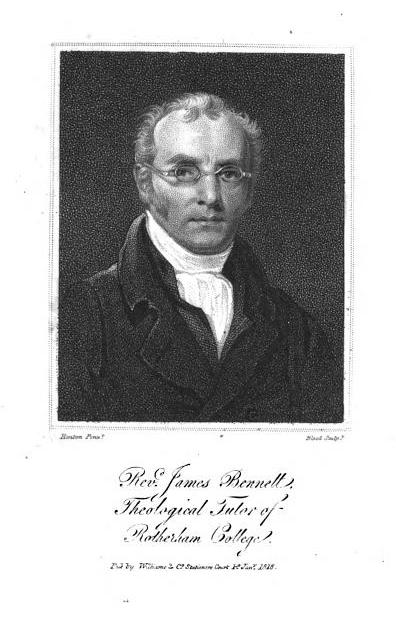
1818 engraving of Bennett

James Bennett (22 May 1774 – 4 December 1862) was an English congregational minister and college principal.

== Life ==
Bennett was born in London, on 22 May 1774, and was educated there and at Gosport, where he was prepared for the congregational ministry David Bogue. In 1797, he was ordained at Romsey, where he remained till 1813. There he became a supporter of the London Missionary Society, and supported Robert and James Haldane in some of their evangelistic tours.

In 1813, Bennett moved to Rotherham, where he was both tutor in Rotherham College and pastor of the church. In 1828, he was transferred to London, where, first in Silver Street and then in Falcon Square, he exercised his ministry until 1860, when he resigned. Among his congregation was David Livingstone, while in London as a medical student.

Bennett died in London, on 4 December 1862, aged 88. He was noted for the defence of Christianity against the unbelievers of the day, particularly Robert Taylor, a popular lecturer; the promotion of Christian missions, as one of the secretaries of the London Missionary Society; and the advancement of the Congregational Union.

== Works ==
Bennett's main works were:

- Memoirs of Risdon Darracott, whose granddaughter, Sarah Comley, he married in 1797.
- The History of Dissenters from A.D. 1688 to 1808, with David Bogue (2nd ed. London, 1833, 3 vols.)
- The History of Dissenters: during the last thirty years, from 1808 – 1838 (1839), sequel by Bennett alone.
- Lectures on the History of Christ, 3 vols.
- Memoirs of the Rev. Dr. Bogue.
- Lectures on the Preaching of Christ.
- Congregational lectures on The Theology of the Early Christian Church.
- Justification as revealed in Scripture.
- Lectures on the Acts of the Apostles.
- Lectures on Infidelity.

== Family ==
James Bennett married Sarah Comley in 1803 in Romsey, Hampshire. His children were James Risdon Bennett (1809), John (1811), Thomas (1813), Joseph (1814) and Sarah Comley (1815).

== Notes ==
Attribution

This article incorporates text from a publication now in the public domain: Stephen, Leslie, ed. (1885). "Bennett, James (1774-1862)". Dictionary of National Biography. Vol. 4. London: Smith, Elder & Co.
