= Carex purdiei =

Scientific classification
- Kingdom: Plantae
- Clade: Tracheophytes
- Clade: Angiosperms
- Clade: Monocots
- Clade: Commelinids
- Order: Poales
- Family: Cyperaceae
- Genus: Carex
- Species: C. purdiei

Binomial name
- Carex purdiei Boott

Synonyms
- Carex peruvida G.A.Wheeler

Species of plant

Carex purdiei is a tussock-forming species of perennial sedge in the family Cyperaceae. It is native to southern parts of Central America and northern parts of South America.

The plant has a tufted appearance with a short creeping rhizome and with slender stems that are 10 to 80 cm (3.9 to 31.5 in) in length and have a triangular cross-section. The pale green flattened leaves are found near the base of the plant and are about as long as the stems with a width of 1.5 to 3.5 mm (0.059 to 0.138 in).

The species was first described by the botanist Francis Boott in 1858 as a part of the work Illustrations of the Genus Carex from the type specimen collected from a bog situated on Nevada de Santa Martha of Colombia by Purdie. It has one synonym;

- Carex peruvida G.A. Wheeler.

The species is found in subtropical areas of Panama, Guatemala, Costa Rica, Ecuador, Bolivia and Colombia.

== See also ==
- List of Carex species
