= Zephaniah Marryat =

English minister

The Reverend Zephaniah Marryat
- Born: 1684
- Died: 1754

Zephaniah Marryat (1684–1754) was an English Nonconformist minister. He was a strict Calvinist.

== Career ==
Marryat was a tutor at dissenting academies funded by the King's Head Society. Between 1743 and 1744 he was a tutor at Stepney Academy; he then taught at Plaisterer's Hall Academy. At Plaisterer's Hall, he was the educator of Robert Robinson and Thomas Williams. Joseph Priestley was also sent to him, but Priestley 'resolutely opposed' the condition of subscribing every six months to 'ten printed articles of the strictest Calvinistic faith.' After Zephaniah Marryat suddenly died, John Conder filled his place as theological tutor in this academy, while Samuel Pike succeeded him as one of the Tuesday lecturers at Pinners' Hall.

== Personal life ==
He was the father of Thomas Marryat.
