= By-paths of Bible Knowledge =

The By-paths of Bible Knowledge series was a collection of books connected with Bible study. History, geography, archaeology, and other topics related to the Bible were presented by various experts. The series was published in London from 1883 by the Religious Tract Society.

== Titles in the series ==
- Cleopatra's Needle. A History of the London Obelisk, with an Exposition of the Hieroglyphics. Vol. 1. by the Rev. James King; 2nd edition. 1884.
- Harkness, Margaret Elise (1883). Assyrian Life and History. Vol. 2. by Margaret Elise Harkness
- Fresh Light from the Ancient Monuments. Vol. 3. by A. H. Sayce; 2nd edition. 1884.
- Recent Discoveries on the Temple Hill at Jerusalem. Vol. 4. 1884. by the Rev. James King
- Babylonian Life and History. Vol. 5. 1884. by E. A. Wallis Budge
- Galilee in the Time of Christ. Vol. 5. by Selah Merrill; 3rd edition. 1891.
- Egypt and Syria. Their Physical Features in Relation to Bible History. Vol. 6. 1887. by Sir J. W. Dawson
- Assyria: Its Princes, Priests, and People. Vol. 7. 1885. by A. H. Sayce
- The Dwellers by the Nile. Chapters on the Life, Literature, History, and Customs of Ancient Egypt. Vol. 8. 1885. by E. A. Wallis Budge
- The Diseases of the Bible. Vol. 9. 1887. by Sir J. Risdon Bennett; Bennett, Sir Risdon (1891). 2nd edition.
- Trees and Plants Mentioned in the Bible. Vol. 10. 1888. by William H. Groser
- Animals Mentioned in the Bible. Vol. 11. 1888. by H. Chichester Hart
- The Hittites; or, The Story of a Forgotten Empire. Vol. 12. 1888. by A. H. Sayce
- The Life and Times of Isaiah, as Illustrated from Contemporary Monuments. Vol. 13. 1889. by A. H. Sayce
- Wood, John Turtle (1890). Modern Discoveries on the Site of Ancient Ephesus. Vol. 14. by J. T. Wood
- Early Bible Songs. Vol. 15. 1890. by A. H. Drysdale
- The Races of the Old Testament. Vol. 16. 1891. by A. H. Sayce, with illustrations from photographs by Flinders Petrie
- The Life and Times of Joseph in the Light of Egyptian Lore. Vol. 17. 1891. by the Rev. H. G. Tomkins
- Social Life among the Assyrians and Babylonians. Vol. 18. 1893. by A. H. Sayce
- The Early Spread of Religious Ideas, especially in the Far East. Vol. 19. 1893. by Joseph Edkins
- The Money of the Bible. Vol. 20. 1894. by G. C. Williamson
- The Sanitary Code of the Pentateuch. Vol. 21. 1894. by the Rev. C. G. K. Gillespie
- The Arch of Titus and the Spoils of the Temple. Vol. 22. 1896. by William Knight
- Monument Facts and Higher Critical Fancies. Vol. 23. by A. H. Sayce; 2nd edition. 1904.
