= Robert Robinson (Dissenting minister) =

English Unitarian minister in the 18th century

Robert Robinson D.D. (c. 1726 – 1791), was an English Dissenting Minister.

== Early life ==
Born about 1726, Robinson was educated at the dissenting academy at Plasterers' Hall, Addle Street, London. His tutors here were Zephaniah Marryat, D. D. (c. 1684 – 1754), theological tutor, "considered to be the best Greek scholar among the Dissenters"; and John Walker, LL. D., Classical and Hebrew tutor, who was "celebrated for his profound knowledge of the oriental languages". Plasterers' Hall was unashamedly Independent or Congregationalist and it evolved into Independent College, Homerton. Marryat and Walker were devoted to Calvinism, and they established a rule that all students should biannually subscribe to the Calvinistic creed of ten articles.

Joseph Priestley's Calvinistic relatives would have sent him to the same academy, had he not, "being at that time an Arminian, ... resolutely opposed it, especially upon finding that if [he] went thither, besides giving a [conversion] experience, [he] must subscribe [his] assent to ten printed articles of the strictest Calvinist faith, and repeat it every six months".

== Career as a minister ==
Robinson abandoned Calvinism while at the academy, though for the time he maintained his Trinitarianism. His first pastorate appears to have been at Congleton, Cheshire, in 1748, where he succeeded Joseph Bourn (1713–?1765), who had moved on to Hindley in Lancashire. The Congleton congregation already had Socinian or Unitarian leanings; Robinson's successors, William Turner and Benjamin Dawson, were certainly of that persuasion. While at Congleton, and in response to the final thwarting of the Jacobite cause, Robinson preached and published a sermon: The Mischievous intentions of popish projectors frustrated.

After four years at Congleton, Robinson moved to the Old Chapel, Dukinfield, Cheshire. He read his inaugural sermon on 12 November 1752. If his removal had been the result of a rift with his Congleton congregation, no record of it has yet come to light. However, he was clearly subject to outbreaks of bad temper while at Dukinfield. His instructions to the town constable to whip a begging tramp, was one factor among many behind a growing rift with his congregation. He left at the end of 1755.

Robinson then began a nineteen-year pastorate at Dob Lane Unitarian Chapel, Failsworth, near Manchester. Two sermons that Robinson preached, and afterwards printed, on the artificial rise in the price of corn gained him the ill-will of interested speculators; but his Dob Lane congregation found fault with the consistency of his Unitarianism as well as with his politics, and his congregation and hence his income soon fell away. As a result, he accepted some editorial work for a local bookseller, Robert Whitworth. Whitworth projected an edition of the Bible, to be sold in serial form. This would be more successful if Robinson could put some academic initials after his name on the title page. Consequently, Robinson persuade some acquaintances to sponsor an application to Edinburgh University, who appearing to mistake him for the more meritorious and academically distinguished Robert Robinson of Cambridge awarded him a Doctorate in Divinity in January 1774.

Finally exasperated with their belligerent preacher, on 14 December 1774 Robinson was handed a thirty-six-signature petition, signed by "eighteen subscribers and eighteen ciphers", demanding his resignation. Robinson's response was to point out that he had been in post some twenty years, and would remain till "August 1st, 1782, and as much longer as I then see cause"; and he published a pamphlet, The doctrine of absolute submission discussed, or, the natural right claimed by some dissenters to dismiss their ministers at pleasure exposed. He had to get this printed in London, because Whitworth, his local publisher, not wishing to become involved in a local dispute, refused to print it. At the back of this pamphlet, and clearly to antagonize his Unitarian congregation, Robinson advertised a further publication: A Discourse in Vindication of the true and proper Divinity of our Lord, &c., with appendices. If it was ever written, it seems never to have been published.

== Retirement ==
Fruitless efforts followed, to force his ejection, and then to buy him out; but Robinson held the trust-deeds and locked the doors of the chapel and graveyard. For three he years preached only one sermon, a Fast-day sermon against the politics of dissent, and burials were made in the parish church-yard or in private grounds. Robinson finally resigned in 1777. He applied for ordination into the Church of England, but was refused. He then bought Barrack Hill House at Bredbury, near Stockport, and retired there.

Robinson died at his son's house in Manchester on 7 December 1791, and was buried 15 December, by his own directions, at seven in the morning, in a square red-brick building erected on his property. A movable glass pane was inserted in his coffin, and the mausoleum had a door for purposes of inspection by a watchman, who was to see if he breathed on the glass. It seems he had a horror of premature burial, and so he instructed his relatives to visit his grave periodically to check that he was still dead.

== Family ==
He was married, with at least one son and daughter.

== Publications ==
His writings included;

- The Mischievous intentions of popish projectors frustrated, 1749
- The Great Sin and Danger of Oppression, 1757
- A Small Scripture Catechism, 1757
- The doctrine of absolute submission discussed, or, the natural right claimed by some dissenters to dismiss their ministers at pleasure exposed, 1774
- Doctrine of Right of Dissenters to Dismiss Ministers, 1775
