= Thomas Williams (Congregational minister) =

British Congregational minister

The Reverend Thomas Williams
- Born: 1724/25
- Died: 19 June 1770; Gosport, Hampshire, England
- Occupation: Congregational minister
- Spouse: Rebecca (née Isgar)

Thomas Williams (1724/1725–1770) was a British Congregational minister.

== Life as an Independent (Congregational) minister ==
From 1745 to 1749 Williams was a student at Plasterers' Hall, London, which was a dissenting academy that provided for the training of Congregational ministers in the Calvinist tradition. Williams was a student of Dr. Zephaniah Marryat. On 6 June 1750 Williams began his ministry at the Independent Chapel in the High Street of Gosport, Hampshire, which was a large chapel capable of seating twelve hundred persons.

Williams was a popular preacher. In 1752 he was proposed for membership of the Kings Head Society, which then administered the dissenting academy at Plasterers' Hall, London, which in 1768 moved to Homerton, where the academy became known as the Homerton Academy or Independent College, Homerton.

Williams died at Gosport on 19 June 1770. He was succeeded at Gosford by Rev. James Watson and when he resigned in 1776, David Bogue was appointed as the minister of the Independent Chapel of Gosport.

== Family ==
Williams married Rebecca Isgar on 6 August 1750, at Rowner near Gosport. Rebecca was born about 1713 and died on 8 April 1799. Thomas and Rebecca had three children: Rebecca (born on 1 May 1751), Thomas (born on 27 May 1753) and Lydia (born on 24 July 1757).

Rebecca married John Voke, a purser on HMS Acteon and Lydia married John Fenn. John Fenn was one of the directors of the Missionary Society of London, which was a non-denominational missionary society formed in England by evangelical Anglicans and Nonconformists, largely Congregationalist in outlook, which in 1795 became the London Missionary Society. In 1804 he participated in the foundation of the British and Foreign Bible Society.

Thomas Williams married Mary Marsh on 17 April 1783. Thomas was a supplier of uniforms to the Royal Navy in Gosport. In 1794 Thomas and Mary and their six children moved to Nottingham, then the thriving centre of the East Midlands industrial revolution. Thomas was listed in the Nottingham trade directories as a hosier. The industry was based on William Lee's stocking frame knitting machine. The business was successful. Thomas received recognition as a Burgess of Nottingham in 1796 and as a Sheriff of Nottingham in 1803. However the prosperity which had been such a feature of the hosiery industry in the second half of the 18th century ended. In 1804 when Thomas died of typhus at the age of 50, Mary was left with a heavily mortgaged business with five sons and three daughters to look after. Their daughter Lydia married Edward Garrard Marsh, a member of the Church Missionary Society (CMS), who was influential in two of her brothers, Henry and William, joining the CMS and becoming missionaries in New Zealand.
