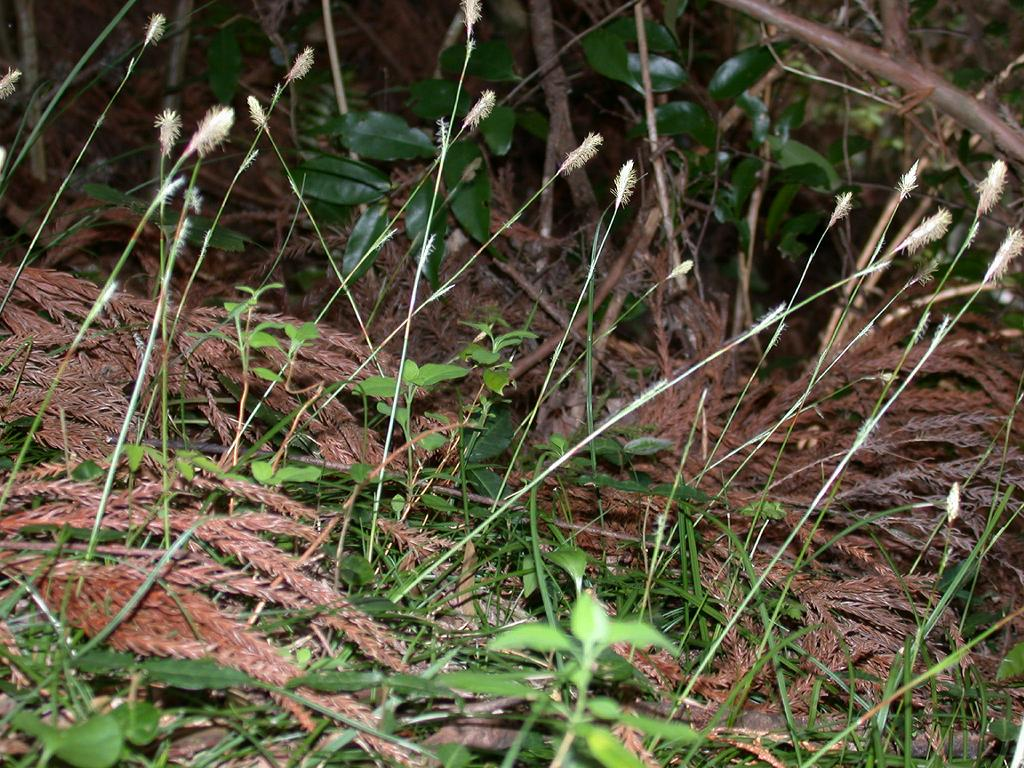
- In Tanabe, Japan
- 'Snowline' cultivar

Scientific classification
- Kingdom: Plantae
- Clade: Tracheophytes
- Clade: Angiosperms
- Clade: Monocots
- Clade: Commelinids
- Order: Poales
- Family: Cyperaceae
- Genus: Carex
- Species: C. conica

Binomial name
- Carex conica Boott

Synonyms
- List: Carex atroviridis var. scabrocaudata T.Koyama; Carex conica f. albomarginata T.Koyama; Carex conica var. lanceolata Akiyama; Carex conica var. leucolepis Franch. & Sav.; Carex conica f. longirostrata Kük.; Carex conica f. mollis Kük.; Carex conica f. rubens Kük.; Carex digama Nakai; Carex discolor Boeckeler; Carex doiana Akiyama; Carex excisa Boott; Carex naumanniana Boeckeler; Carex okushirensis Akiyama; Carex yoshinoi Ohwi

= Carex conica =

Species of plant

Carex conica is a species of flowering plant in the sedge genus Carex, family Cyperaceae. It is native to South Korea, Japan, and the northern Ryukyu Islands. A rhizomatous perennial reaching 15 to 20 cm (6 to 8 in), it has a variegated cultivar, 'Snowline', that is available from commercial suppliers and is recommended for a number of garden applications.

== Subtaxa ==
The following varieties are accepted:

- Carex conica var. conica – South Korea, Japan
- Carex conica var. pallescens T.Hoshino & H.Ikeda – Honshu, Kyushu
- Carex conica var. scabrocaudata (T.Koyama) Hatus. ex T.Hoshino – Uji and Tokara Islands
