= David Bogue =

British noncomformist leader

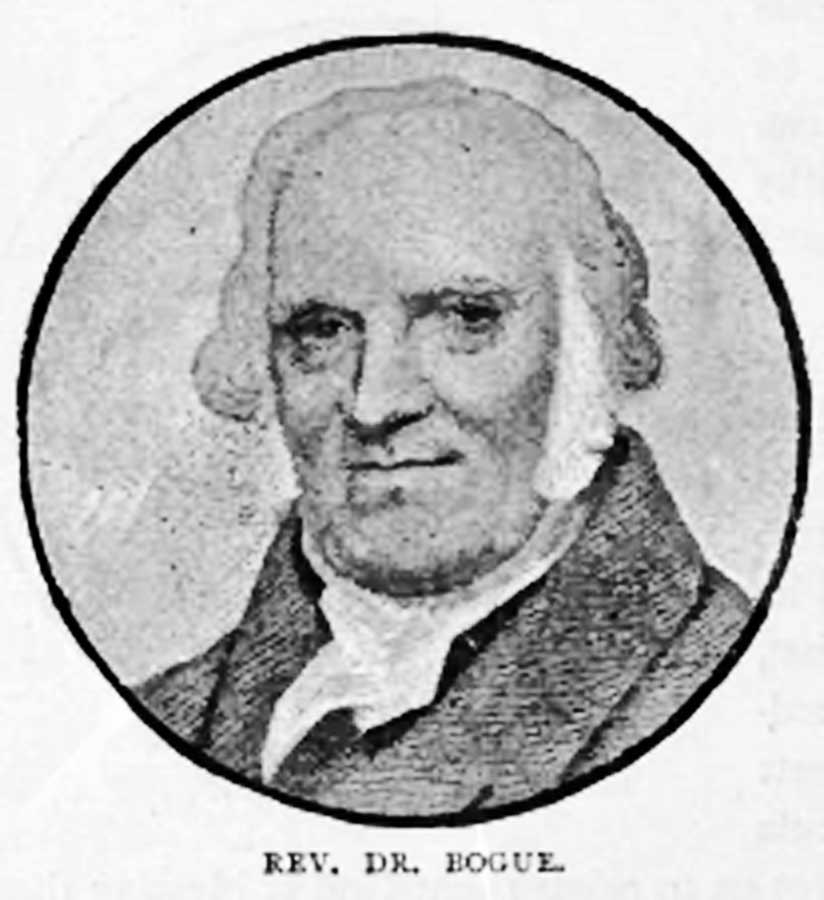
- Nonconformist preacher
- Born: 18 February 1750; Coldingham, Berwickshire, Scotland
- Died: 25 October 1825; Brighton, England

David Bogue (18 February 1750 – 25 October 1825) was a Scottish nonconformist religious leader.

== Life ==
He was born at Hallydown Farm, in the parish of Coldingham, Berwickshire, Scotland, the son of John Bogue, farmer, and his wife, Margaret Swanston. He received his early education in Eyemouth.

After studying Divinity at Edinburgh University, he was licensed to preach by the Church of Scotland, but, failing to find a patron in Scotland, was sent by the Church to London in 1771, to teach in schools at Edmonton, Hampstead and then Mansion House Cottage in Camberwell. In 1777, he settled as minister of the independent Congregational church at Gosport in Hampshire. His predecessors at the Independent Chapel of Gosport were James Watson (1770–76) and Thomas Williams (1750–70).

In 1771 he established an institution for preparing men for the ministry. It was the age of the new-born missionary enterprise, and Bogue's academy was largely the seed from which the London Missionary Society grew. In 1800 the society placed missionaries with Bogue for preparation for their ministries. Among the notable students he taught, the most impactful were the first two Protestant missionaries to China, Robert Morrison (missionary) (from 1804 to 1805), and William Milne (missionary) (from 1809 to 1812). Bogue himself would have gone to India in 1796 if not for the opposition of the East India Company. In 1824 he taught Samuel Dyer at Gosport before he left for Penang as a missionary with the London Missionary Society.

He was also involved in founding the British and Foreign Bible Society and the Religious Tract Society, and in conjunction with James Bennett, minister at Romsey, wrote a well-known History of Dissenters (3 vols., 1809). Another of his writings was an Essay on the Divine Authority of the New Testament.

In 1815 Yale University awarded him a doctor of divinity (DD).

He died on 25 October 1825 in Brighton during the London Missionary Society's annual tour.

== Publications ==
- Reasons for Seeking a Repeal of the Test Acts (1790)
- An Essay on the Divine Authority of the New Testament (1801)
- Catechism for the Use of All Churches in the French Empire (1807)
- A History of the Dissenters, from the Revolution of 1688 to 1808 4 vols. (1808–12) vol. 1, vol. 2, vol. 3, vol. 4
- On Universal Peace; Being Extracts from a Discourse Delivered in October 1813 (1819) Peace Society tract

== Notes ==
Attribution

This article incorporates text from a publication now in the public domain: Grosart, Alexander Balloch (1886). "Bogue, David". In Stephen, Leslie (ed.). Dictionary of National Biography. Vol. 5. London: Smith, Elder & Co.
