= Thomas Marryat =

English physician (1730–1792)

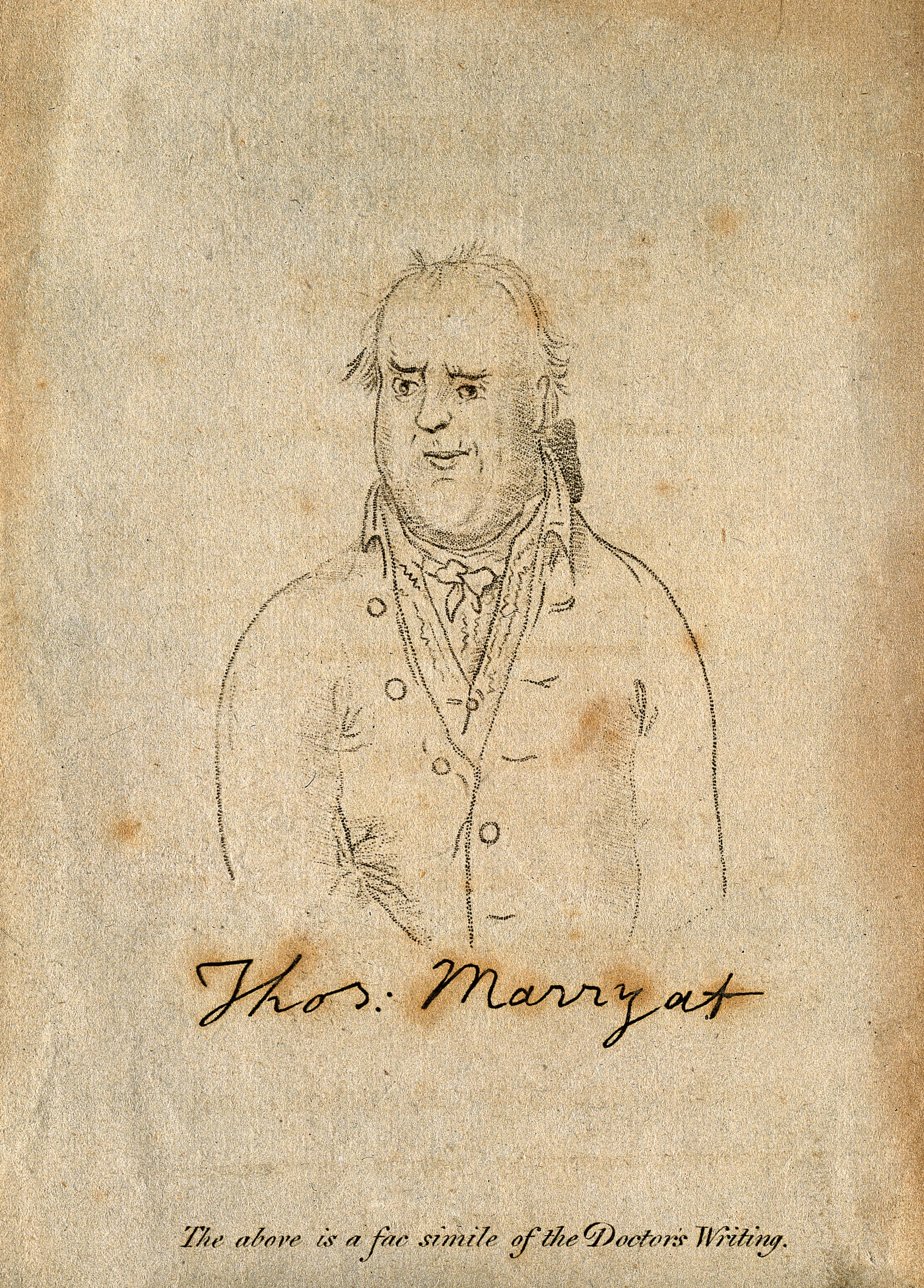
Portrait (Credit: Wellcome Collection)

Thomas Marryat M.D. (1730–1792) was an English physician, medical writer and wit.

== Life ==
Born in London, he was the son of Zephaniah Marryat, a nonconformist minister, and was educated for the Presbyterian ministry. From 1747 until 1749 he belonged to a late-night poetical club. It met at the Robin Hood, Butcher Row, Strand, London, and among the members were Richard Brookes, Moses Browne, Stephen Duck, Martin Madan, and Thomas Madox; members brought a piece of poetry, which if approved might be sent to the Gentleman's Magazine and other periodicals. It was at this club that the plan and title of the Monthly Review, subsequently used by Ralph Griffiths, were brought up.

Marryat gave up on the ministry, after a time at Southwold and Barnet, and left his family in 1760. He went to Edinburgh, where he was a medical student and graduated M.D. For a while he sought practice in London, but in 1762 made a tour of continental medical schools, and subsequently visited America, obtaining practice where he could. On his return in 1766 he resided for several years in Antrim and Northern Ireland.

In February 1774 Marryat moved to Shrewsbury, but finally settled in Bristol about 1785. Here he delivered a course of lectures on therapeutics which was well attended. He had some success in practice, which dropped off, and refused assistance from relations.

Marryat died on 29 May 1792, and was buried in the ground belonging to the chapel in Lewin's Mead, in Brunswick Square, Bristol. His manners were blunt, but he was considered honest, and kind, especially to the poor. More orthodox physicians took him as an empiric. He prescribed enormous doses of drastic medicines to nonpaying patients, and, for dysentery, paper boiled in milk. The bookseller Henry Lemoine sold a "bug-water", to which Marryat lent his name.

== Works ==
Marryat published:

- Medical Aphorisms, or a Compendium of Physic, founded on irrefragible principles, Ipswich, 1756 or 1757, mostly retracted later.
- Therapeutics, or a New Practice of Physic, which was "humbly inscribed to everybody". It was first published in Latin in 1758 and reprinted in Dublin in 1764; after which a publisher Dodd issued two spurious copies, one in Cork, dated 1770, and another in London in 1774. A fourth edition was issued at Shrewsbury, under Marryat's supervision, in 1775. A pocket edition, with the title of The Art of Healing, became popular, a twentieth impression having appeared at Bristol in 1805. Prefixed to it is a life of Marryat, with his portrait engraved by Johnson, and autograph.
- The Philosophy of Masons, heterodox and offensive to friends.

Marryat also wrote verse. A new edition of his Sentimental Fables for the Ladies, republished from an Irish copy, appeared at Bristol in 1791. It was dedicated to Hannah More, and sold well.

== Family ==
Marryat married Sarah Davy of Southwold in 1754. Among their children was Joseph Marryat, a Member of Parliament and banker, who was the father of Frederick Marryat the writer.

== Notes ==
Attribution

This article incorporates text from a publication now in the public domain: Lee, Sidney, ed. (1893). "Marryat, Thomas". Dictionary of National Biography. Vol. 36. London: Smith, Elder & Co.
