= John Armstrong (physician) =

English physician (1784–1829)

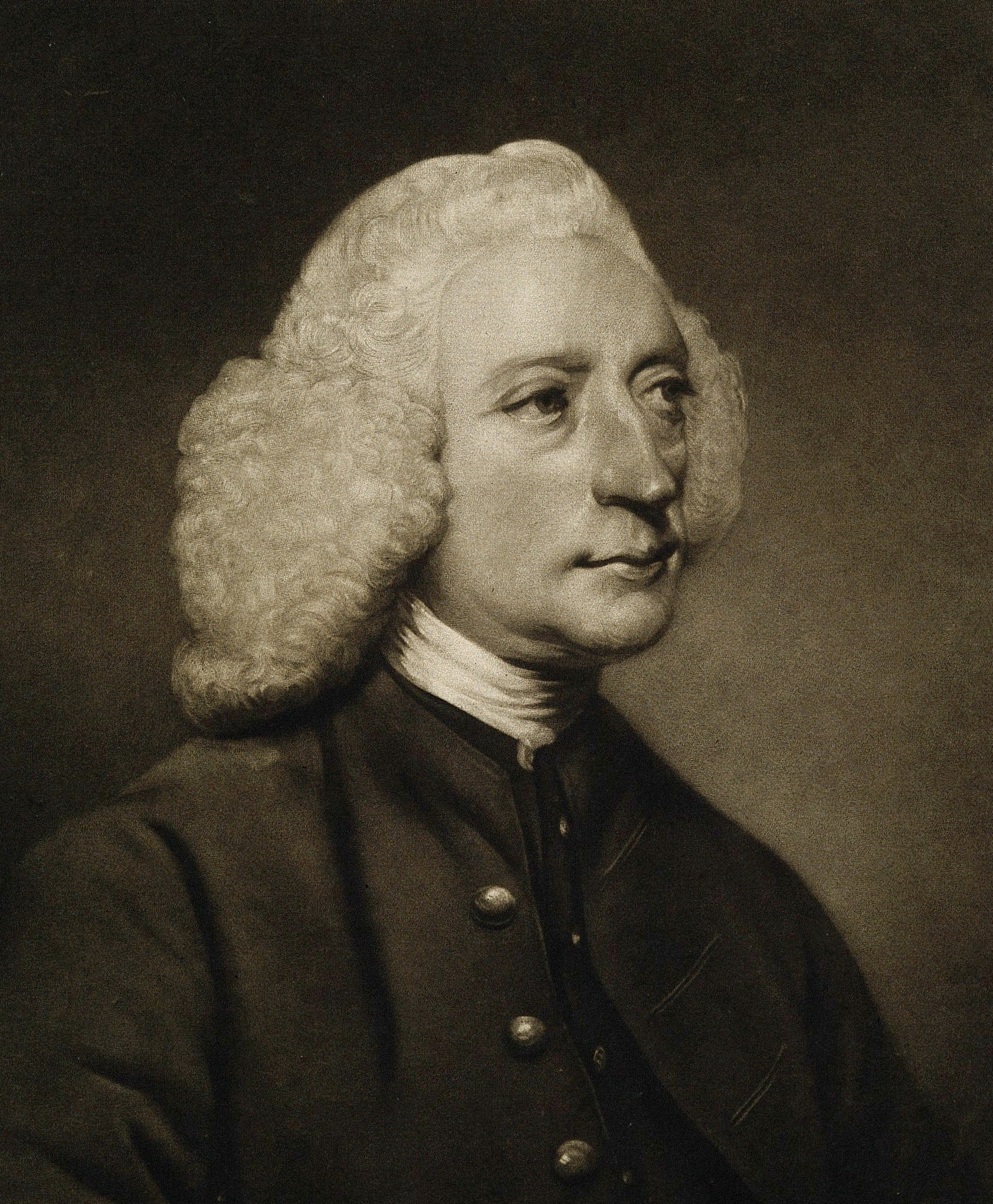
John Armstrong

John Armstrong (8 May 1784 – 12 December 1829) was an English physician.

== Life ==
Armstrong was born, on 8 May 1784, at Ayres Quay, near Bishop Wearmouth, County Durham, where his father, George Armstrong, of humble birth, was a superintendent of glass works. He was educated privately, and then studied medicine at the University of Edinburgh, where he graduated M.D. in 1807 with a dissertation, De Causis Morborum Hydropicorum. He practised in Sunderland, and was physician to the Sunderland Infirmary. In 1818 he moved to London, and in 1819 he was appointed physician to the London Fever Institution, a post which he resigned in 1824; and in 1820 became licentiate of the College of Physicians.

Armstrong acquired a practice and also became a popular teacher of medicine. In 1821 he joined Edward Grainger, a teacher of anatomy, as lecturer on medicine at the school then being founded by the latter in Webb Street, a significant institution of the time. In 1826 he joined James Risdon Bennett in founding another school in Little Dean Street, Soho, and for some time lectured in both places.

In 1828, failing health compelled Armstrong to give up teaching, and he died of consumption on 12 December 1829, at the age of 45.

== Works ==
While at Sunderland, Armstrong published, besides several memoirs in the Edinburgh Medical Journal, Facts and Observations relative to the Fever commonly called Puerperal (London, 1814), and Practical Illustrations of Typhus and other Febrile Diseases (London, 1816), by which he became known to the medical profession. He published Practical Illustrations of the Scarlet Fever, Measles, Pulmonary Consumption (London, 1818), which added to his reputation. Popular at the time, and based on his own observations, they became obsolete shortly. Armstrong's own views changed in relation to typhus, which he in his earlier works asserted to be contagious, but in his later memoirs (The Lancet, 1825) attributed to a malarial origin. In treatment Armstrong was an ardent advocate of the antiphlogistic system, and made a copious use of bleeding.

Armstrong wrote also:

- An Address to the Members of the Royal College of Surgeons on the injurious conduct and defective state of that Corporation with reference to Professional Rights, Medical Science, and the Public Health, London, 1825. His controversy with the Royal College of Surgeons arose out of an attempt by the College to discourage private medical teaching by refusing to accept certificates except from the recognised hospitals and their medical schools. With the Royal College of Physicians he was at odds, too, having been rejected when he first presented himself as a candidate for the licentiateship.
- The Morbid Anatomy of the Stomach, Bowels, and Liver, illustrated by a series of plates with explanatory letterpress, and a summary of the symptoms of the acute and chronic affections of the above-named organs, London, (unfinished).
- Lectures on the Morbid Anatomy, Nature, and Treatment of Acute and Chronic Diseases, edited by Joseph Rix (after the author's death), London, 1834.

== Family ==
In 1811 he married Sarah, daughter of Charles Spearman, by whom he left a family, including a son John, who became bishop of Grahamstown.
