= James Risdon Bennett =

English physician (1809–1891)

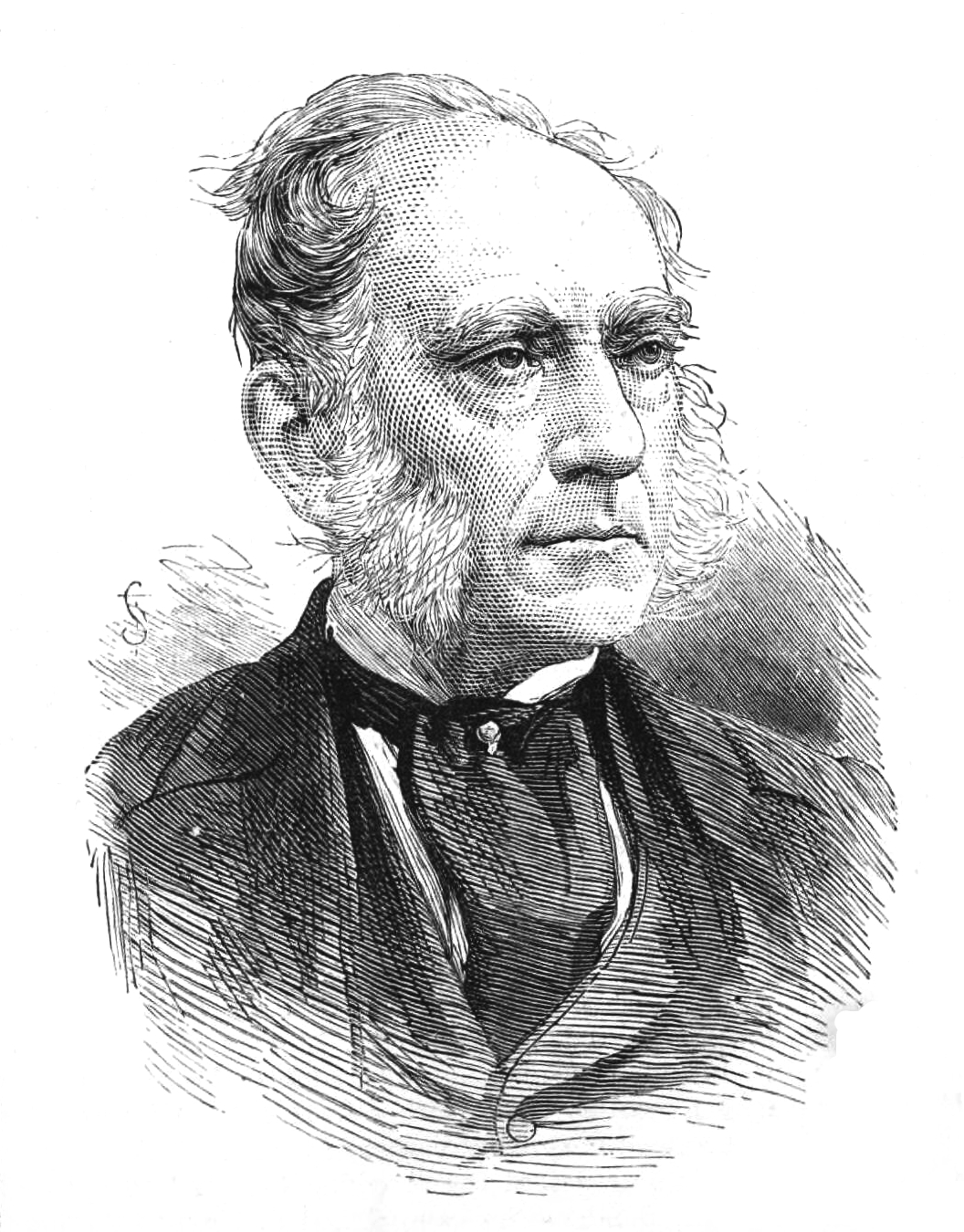
- Born: 29 September 1809; Romsey, England
- Died: 24 December 1891 (aged 82); Cavendish Square, London, England
- Occupation: physician

Sir James Risdon Bennett (29 September 1809 – 24 December 1891) was an English physician.

== Life ==
James Bennett was born in Romsey on 29 September 1809, the eldest son of James Bennett, a nonconformist minister. He received his education at Rotherham College, Yorkshire, of which his father became principal, and at the age of fifteen was apprenticed to Thomas Waterhouse of Sheffield. In 1830, he went to Paris, and then to Edinburgh, where he graduated M.D. in 1833.

In autumn 1833, Bennett accompanied Lord Beverley to Rome, and spent two or three summers in his company and that of Lord Aberdeen. On his return to England in 1837, he became physician to the Aldersgate Street dispensary, and lectured on medicine at the Charing Cross Hospital medical school, and also at Grainger's school of medicine.

In 1843, Bennett was appointed assistant physician to St. Thomas's Hospital, and in 1849 full physician. On the foundation of the City of London Hospital for Diseases of the Chest in 1848 he was appointed physician there; and from 1843 to its dissolution in 1867 acted as secretary to the Sydenham Society. He was made a Fellow of the Royal College of Physicians in 1846. In 1850, he was President of the Medical Society of London. In 1875, he was elected Fellow of the Royal Society.

Settling in Finsbury Square on his marriage in 1841, he had success as a consultant, especially in connection with chest diseases, an early adopter of the stethoscope. In 1876, he was elected President of the Royal College of Physicians, the first non Oxford or Cambridge graduate since its inception, and held the post for 5 years. He was knighted in 1881. He then moved to Cavendish Square, where he died on 14 December 1891, aged 82.

He was the Lumleian Lecturer in 1870 on "Cancer and Cancerous Growths."

== Works ==
Bennett's published works included:

- a translation of Wilhelm Kramer on Diseases of the Ear, 1837;
- Acute Hydrocephalus, an essay which obtained the Fothergillian gold medal of the Medical Society of London in 1842, and was published in following year; and
- Intra-thoracic Tumours, 1872, Lumleian Lectures.
- The Diseases of the Bible. By-paths of Bible Knowledge. Vol. 9. Religious Tract Society. 1887.

== Family ==
Bennett married, in June 1841, Ellen Selfe, daughter of the Rev. Henry Page of Rose Hill, Worcester, by whom he had nine children, of whom six survived.

== Notes ==
Attribution

This article incorporates text from a publication now in the public domain: Lee, Sidney, ed. (1901). "Bennett, James Risdon". Dictionary of National Biography (1st supplement). Vol. 1. London: Smith, Elder & Co.
