= Susanna and Mary Parker =

English schoolteachers (1772–1856 and 1774–1859)

Susanna and Mary Parker (1772–1856 and 1774–1859) were English schoolteachers who ran a boarding school in Ashbourne, Derbyshire.

== Life ==
Susanna and Mary Parker were born in 1772 and 1774 to physician Erasmus Darwin and Mary Parker, a governess who had been hired in 1770, at the age of seventeen, to look after Darwin's youngest son Robert. Darwin had a public affair with their mother for eight years, but never considered marrying her; she married a merchant, Joseph Day, in 1782.

Susanna and Mary were brought up alongside Darwin's twelve other children. They were educated with the intention of going into teaching and worked in private homes as teachers or governesses. Lucy Hardcastle, whom Charles Darwin also suspected was a child of Erasmus Darwin, was educated with them.

In 1794, Darwin bought a former public house in Ashbourne for Susanna and Mary to run as a school. He published a booklet, The Plan for the Conduct of Female Education, as a result of discussions about the school's curriculum, arguing that girls should be educated in schools rather than at home. Susanna and Mary successfully ran the school together for fifteen years, educating the daughters of many affluent Midlands families.

In 1809, Susanna married physician Henry Hadley. They had two children and also brought up Hadley's niece. Mary continued running the school until her retirement in 1827, when she continued living in the house until her death. The building, now called Madge House, commemorates the school with a plaque.
