= Lucy Hardcastle =

British botanist and teacher

- Born: Lucy Swift; 1771 or 1772; Derby, England
- Died: April 1834, aged about 62
- Occupations: Botanist, school proprietor, teacher
- Notable work: An Introduction to the Elements of the Linnaean System of Botany, for Young Persons

Lucy Hardcastle (c. 1771–1834) was a British botanist and teacher who ran a school in Derby. She was the author of An Introduction to the Elements of the Linnaean System of Botany, for Young Persons, published in 1830.

== Early and family life ==
Lucy Swift was born in Derby around 1771, the second child of Lamech and Dorothy Swift. Her father was initially a clerk to the collector of excise but later ran the Derby Silk Mill as a silk throwster where silk thread was prepared for weaving. As a child or young person she was friendly with Erasmus Darwin's illegitimate daughters Susanna and Mary and she was instructed, alongside them, by Darwin. This early education began her interest in botany. She married John Hardcastle, a grocer and tea dealer in Birmingham, in January 1792, but as a consequence of illness, bereavements, and the failure of her husband's business, the couple returned to Derby with their two children.

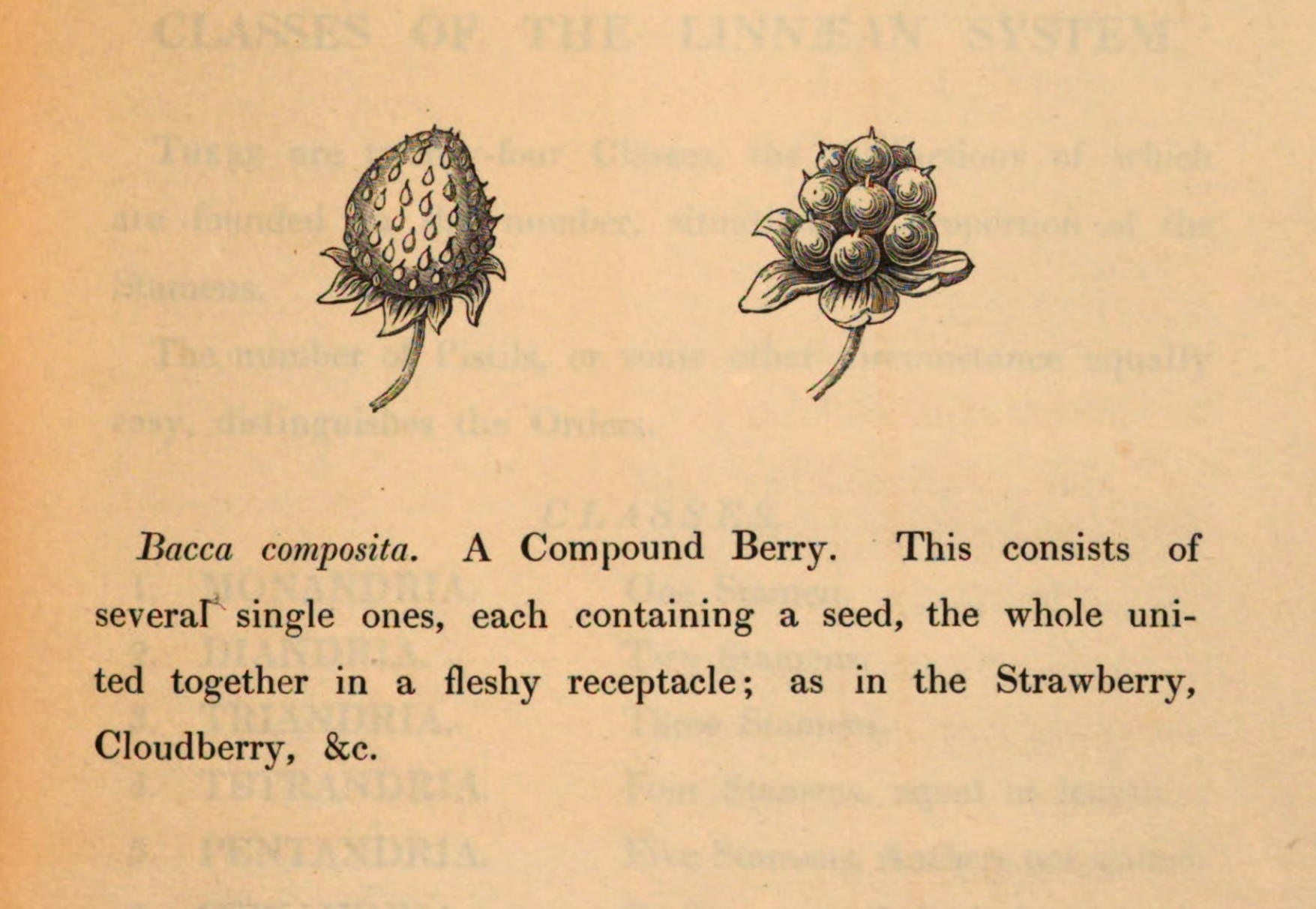
Lucy Hardcastle, Bacca composita, An Introduction to the Elements of the Linnaean System of Botany, for Young Persons, London, 1830, p. 81.

== Botanical and education career ==
To support the family through her husband's continuing ill health, she ran a day and boarding school for young ladies from at least 1796 until the 1830s, and she also gave classes in botany and illustration. She was in communication with some of the leading botanists of the day. Through Francis Boott, the husband of her younger daughter Mary, Hardcastle was introduced to James Edward Smith, founder of the Linnean Society of London.

A manuscript including eight watercolours of flowers and fungi was purchased in 2021 by Derby Museum and Art Gallery with funding from Arts Council England / V&A Purchase Grant Fund as well as the Derby Museums' Friends group. In addition to the paintings, it records her observations on meadow saffron and the timing of flowering in autumn but apparent seed-set in spring. The manuscript had originally been a gift from Hardcastle to Francis Boott after he qualified as a medical doctor.

In 1830 Hardcastle published a book for young people about the Linnean classification system for plants. An Introduction to the Elements of the Linnean System of Botany provides an illustrated introduction to plant anatomy and botanical terminology before giving an outline of the Linnean system of classification. The book also includes many ethnobotany anecdotes.

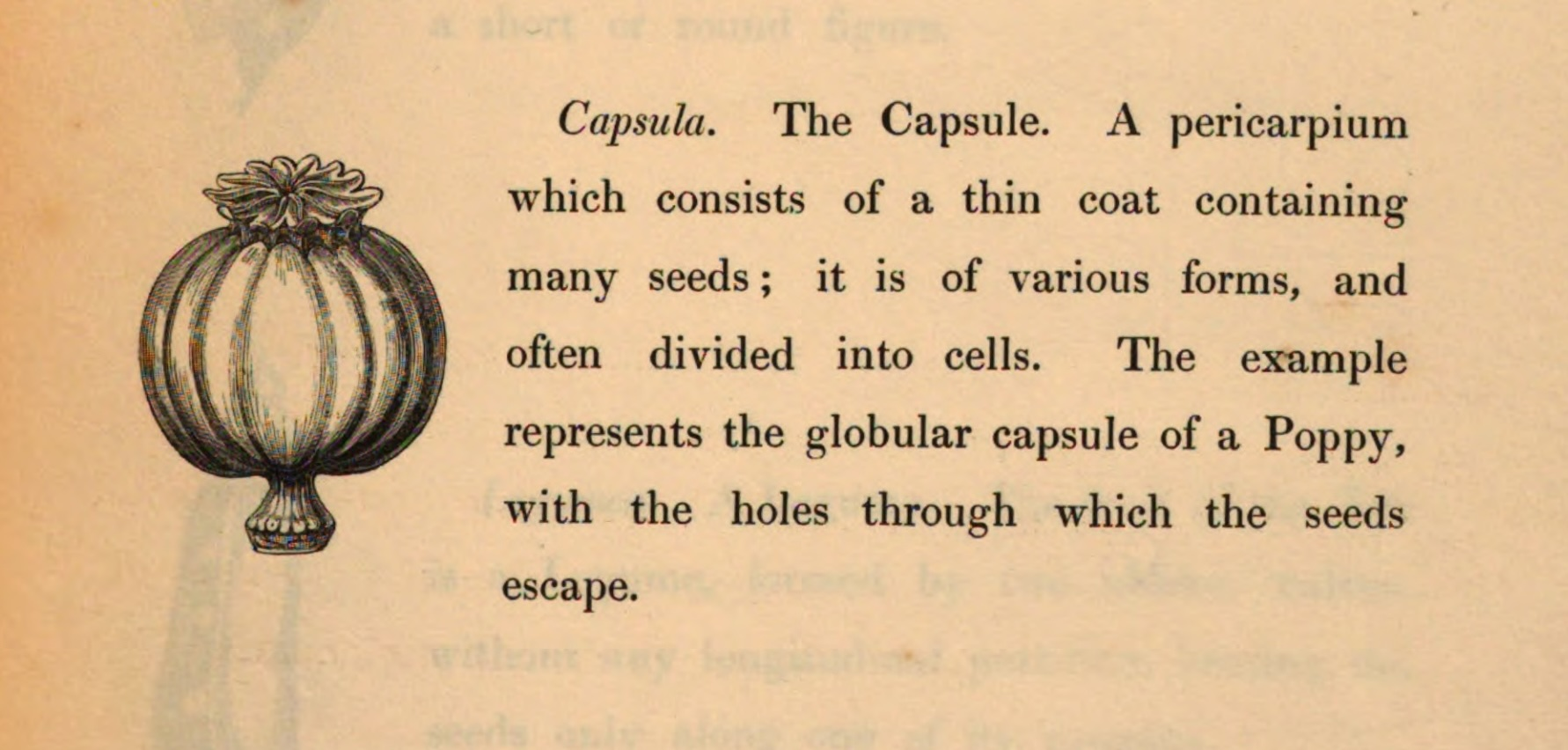
Lucy Hardcastle, Capsula, An Introduction to the Elements of the Linnaean System of Botany, for Young Persons, London, 1830, p. 75.

== Works ==
- An Introduction to the Elements of the Linnaean System of Botany, for Young Persons published Thomas Richardson, Derby and Hurst, Chance & Co., London. 1830. Original manuscript now held in the Natural History Museum, London.
- Watercolour of a mushroom in Derby Museum and Art Gallery
- Manuscript of 8 watercolours and botanical observations (1825), originally a gift to Francis Boott, Hardcastle's son-in-law. Now in Derby Museum and Art Gallery
