= Wilhelm Kramer =

German otologist

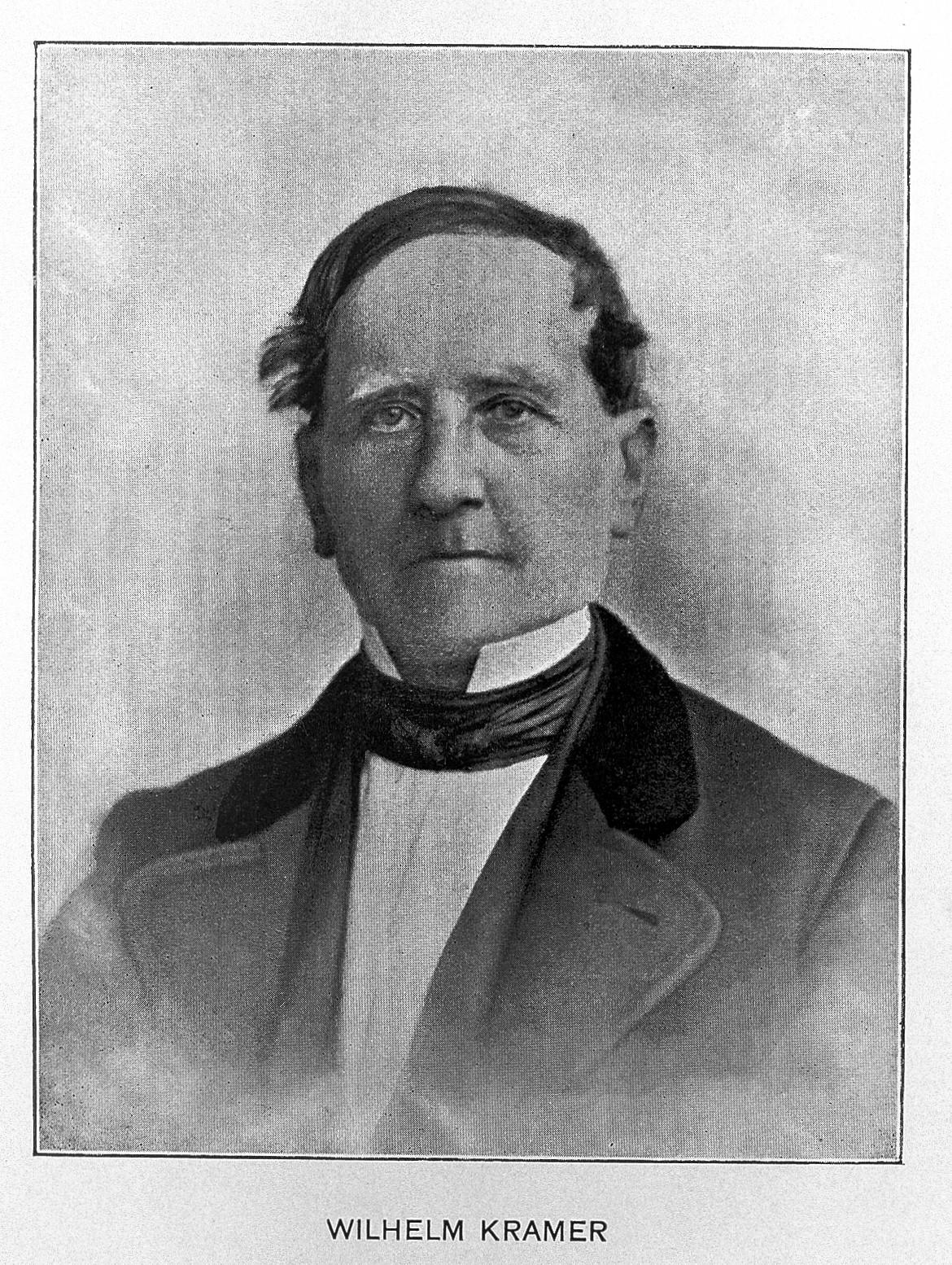
Portrait. Credit: Wellcome Library

Wilhelm Kramer (17 December 1801 in Halberstadt, Kingdom of Prussia – 7 December 1876 in Berlin, German Empire) was a German otologist.

== Biography ==
He studied medicine at the universities of Göttingen and Berlin, receiving his doctorate from the latter institution in 1823. He furthered his education in Vienna and Paris, then returned to Berlin, where he served as an assistant to psychiatrist Anton Ludwig Ernst Horn. Shortly afterwards, he opened a private medical practice, in which he specialized in the treatment of ear diseases.

He was among the first physicians to devote his attention exclusively to the science of otology. He is credited as being the first to use catheterization and auscultation in determining conditions of the middle ear. He also devised a specialized ear speculum ("Kramer's aural speculum").

== Published works ==
He was the author of "Erfahrungen über die Erkenntniss und Heilung der langwierigen Schwerhörigkeit" (1833), a work in the field of otology that was greatly revised and republished in 1836 with the title of "Die Erkenntniss und Heilung der Ohrenkrankheiten". The second edition was translated into English by James Risdon Bennett as "Nature and treatment of diseases of the ear" (1837). The book was considered to be an important influence to the career of Prosper Ménière, who in 1848 produced a French translation, titled "Traite des maladies de l'oreille". Another work by Kramer that was translated into English was "The aural surgery of the present day" (1863), the original German title being "Die Ohrenheilkunde der Gegenwart". Other noteworthy written efforts by Kramer include:

- Die Ohrenheilkunde in den Jahren 1851-1855. Ein Nachtrag zu der Erkenntniss und Heilung der Ohrenkrankheiten, 1856 – Otology in the years 1851-1855: A supplement to the knowledge and treatment of ear diseases.
- Handbuch der Ohrenheilkunde, 1867 – Handbook of otology.
- Ohrenkrankheiten und Ohrenärzte in England und Deutschland, 1865 – Ear diseases and otologists in England and Germany.
- Die Ohrenheilkunde der letzten 50 Jahre, 1873 – Otology of the last fifty years.
