= Carex micropoda =

Scientific classification
- Kingdom: Plantae
- Clade: Tracheophytes
- Clade: Angiosperms
- Clade: Monocots
- Clade: Commelinids
- Order: Poales
- Family: Cyperaceae
- Genus: Carex
- Subgenus: Carex subg. Psyllophora
- Section: Carex sect. Dornera
- Species: C. micropoda

Binomial name
- Carex micropoda C.A.Mey.

Synonyms
- Carex crandallii; Carex jacobi-peteri; Carex nivalis (invalid)

Species of grass-like plant

Carex micropoda is a species of sedge found in temperate and boreal regions of the Northern Hemisphere.

== Description ==
Carex micropoda forms tufts of leaves, each leaf being up to 2 millimetres (0.079 in) wide. The stems are 5–40 centimetres (2.0–15.7 in) tall, and end in a single spike of flowers with the female (pistillate) flowers towards the base of the spike, and the male (staminate) flowers towards the tip. The utricles are 3–5 mm (0.12–0.20 in) long and 1.0–1.3 mm (0.039–0.051 in) wide, with a short brown beak.

== Taxonomy ==
Carex micropoda was first described by Carl Anton von Meyer in 1831. It is very similar to, and possibly synonymous with, a number of other published taxa.
