= Society of Biblical Archaeology =

The Society of Biblical Archaeology was founded in London in 1870 by Samuel Birch to further Biblical archaeology. It published a series of Proceedings in which some important papers read before the Society were preserved.

In 1919, the Society of Biblical Archaeology merged into the Royal Asiatic Society of Great Britain and Ireland.
