= Edward Grainger =

English teacher of anatomy (1797–1824)

Edward Grainger (1797–1824) was an English teacher of anatomy and dresser to Sir Astley Cooper. Grainger opened an anatomical school in Webb Street, Southwark, London in 1819 after his offer to teach at Guy's Hospital was rejected.

The school was successful until the College of Surgeons changed their by-laws to squeeze the independent schools. The Webb Street school was continued by Edward's brother, Richard Dugard Grainger, after Edward's early death.

== Life ==
Grainger was born in Birmingham and was the elder son of Edward Grainger, who was a surgeon and later the author of Medical and Surgical Remarks (1815). After receiving medical instruction from his father, he entered as a student at the united hospitals of St. Thomas's and Guy's in October 1816. He was a dresser to Sir Astley Cooper, who advised him to open an anatomical school in Birmingham after he had become a member of the Royal College of Surgeons. When Charles Aston Key was appointed demonstrator of anatomy by Cooper, Grainger was anxious to be made joint demonstrator with him. Failing in that, he opened an anatomical school and dissecting-room of his own in June 1819. Grainger's school was located in the large attic of a tailor's house in St. Saviour's Churchyard, Southwark.

Grainger began with 30 pupils and was successful. In the autumn of 1819, he moved to a location close to Guy's in Webb Street, Maze Pond, in a building had been used as a Roman Catholic chapel. Grainger's school had the favour of the resurrection men, speedily rivalled the hospital schools, and drew pupils from them. In 1821 he built a theatre in Webb Street and was joined by John Armstrong and Richard Phillips. Despite obstacles put in the way of the students by hospital surgeons in London, especially the council of the Royal College of Surgeons, Grainger's school grew. In 1823 he built a larger theatre, and the school had nearly 300 pupils.

Grainger died from consumption at his father's house in Birmingham, on 13 January 1824, having not quite completed his twenty-seventh year.
