= Risdon Darracott =

Risdon Darracott (1717-1759), called "The Star of the West", was an English non-conformist clergyman. He was born at Swanage in Dorset on 1 February, 1717. He was the second child and only son of Rev. Richard Darracott (1688-1727) by his first wife Hannah (nee Risdon) (1693-1717). He was educated first by a Mr. Palk, a dissenting minister of South Molton, and then at about 15 years old under the tutelage of Dr. Philip Doddridge at Northampton.

Following his training in Northampton he first went to Chumleigh, Devon where his father had been minister at the time of his death. But there was a split in the congregation between calling him and another young minister. From there he went to Penzance, Cornwall. But while there he fell ill, and removed to Barnstaple in North Devon. He finally became minister at Wellington, Somerset and from his settling there in around 1739 until his death, his preaching & teaching grew the congregation there from 28 to nearly 300.

His biography was written by Rev. James Bennett, entitled "The Star of the West" published in 1813.
