= Religious Tract Society =

British publisher of Christian literature

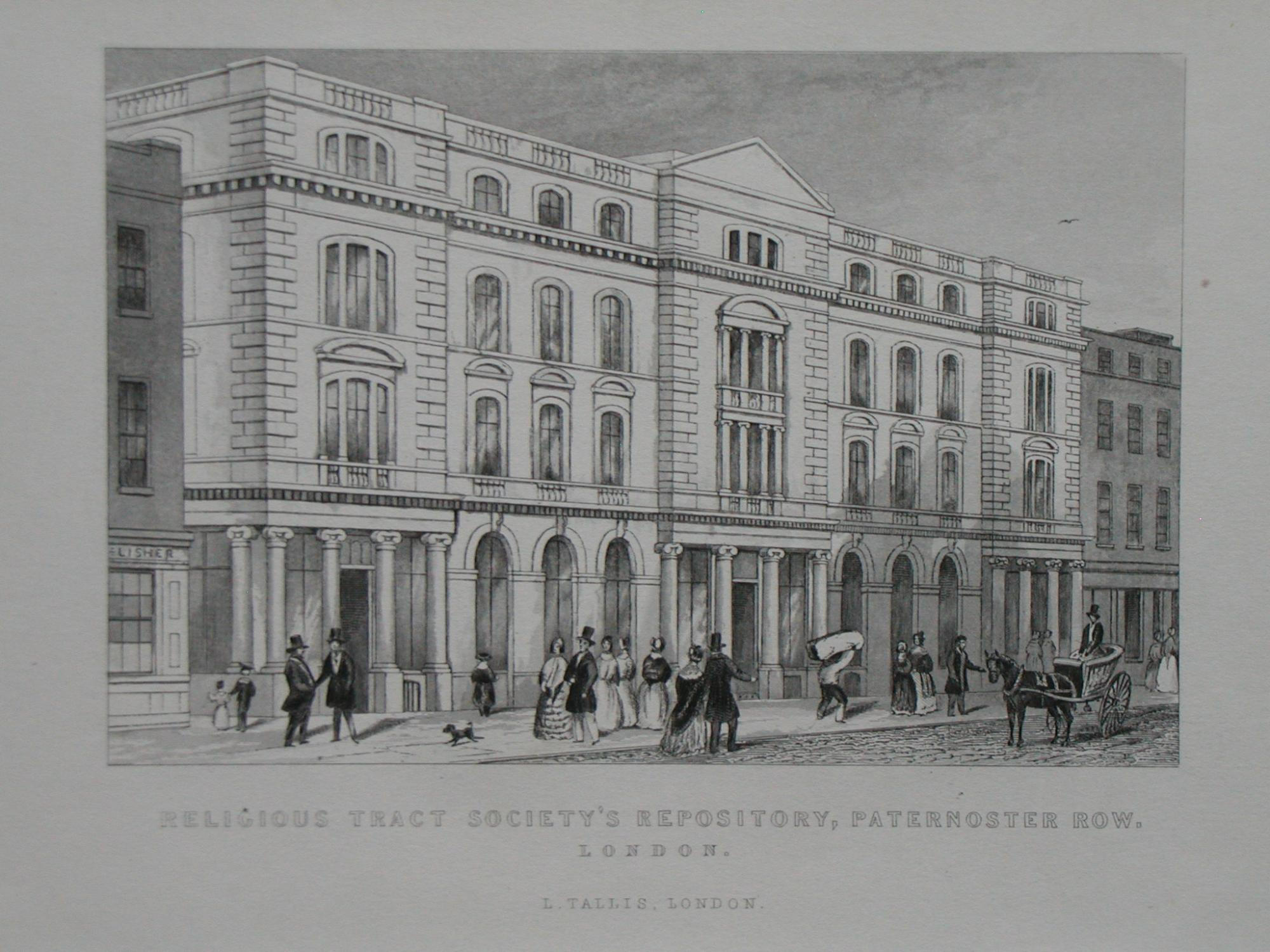
- The Depository of the Religious Tract Society at 56 Paternoster Row, opened in 1844.
- Merged into: 1935
- Successor: United Society for Christian Literature
- Founded: 1799
- Location: London, England

The Religious Tract Society was a British evangelical Christian organization founded in 1799 and known for publishing a variety of popular religious and quasi-religious texts in the 19th century. The society engaged in charity as well as commercial enterprise, publishing books and periodicals for profit.

Periodicals published by the RTS included Boy's Own Paper, Girl's Own Paper and The Leisure Hour. In 1935, it merged into what is today the United Society for Christian Literature.

== Formation and early history ==
The idea for the society came from the Congregationalist minister George Burder, who raised the idea while meeting with the London Missionary Society (founded in 1795) in May 1799. It was formally established on 10 May 1799, having a treasurer, a secretary, and ten committee members, with members required to "[subscribe] half a guinea or upwards annually". Its initial membership was drawn from the London Missionary Society, and included:

- David Bogue, Independent;
- Robert Hawker, Anglican;
- Joseph Hughes, Baptist; and
- Joseph Reyner as treasurer, business partner of Joseph Hardcastle, Independent.

At its formation, the society had support from bishops, including Shute Barrington (Durham) and Beilby Porteus (London).

Founders of the RTS would go on to found the British and Foreign Bible Society in 1804.

Initially, the society's only stated goal was the production and distribution across Britain of religious tracts—short pamphlets explaining the principles of the Christian religion, with the aim of spreading salvation to the masses.

The society was interdenominational, including members belonging to most branches of Protestantism in Britain (such as Congregationalists, Baptists, and Quakers), as well as the established churches of England and Scotland; however, it excluded Roman Catholics and Unitarians.

== Tracts ==
For the first 25 years of the society's existence, its main activity was the publication and distribution of religious tracts. The first RTS tract was David Bogue's An Address to Christians, Recommending the Distribution of Cheap Religious Tracts, which listed seven recommendations for writing effective religious tracts, including that they be "plain", "striking", "entertaining", and "adapted to various situations and conditions" of its audience. These principles would tracts written in the following century.

In its first year, the society had a catalogue of 34 distinct tracts, and printed 200,000 copies. Its output increased over the years, and by 1820 its catalogue included 279 tracts, and it was printing more than 5 million annually.

From 1814, the society began publishing some tracts specifically for children.

== Commercial publishing ==
In the 1820s and 1830s, the society began commercially publishing bound books and periodicals for adults and children, shifting away from its previous focus on tracts, and leading to a sharp increase in the society's income. This shift was the subject of some criticism both within and outside the organization. Subscribers to the society raised concerns that their contributions were being used to subsidize books which were aimed at a middle-class audience and priced out of reach of the working-class families that represented the previous targets of the society's evangelical efforts. In 1825, the society formally separated the accounting for its charitable and commercial work into what they termed a "Benevolent Fund" and "Trade Fund" in order to give greater transparency around how subscription funds were used. Beginning in 1835, the Trade Fund became entirely self-sufficient, with some profits from commercial publishing flowing into the Benevolent Fund.

By the 1840s, the RTS had become a sizeable publishing house, with more than 60 employees and a catalogue of more than 4,000 works in 110 languages.

=== Periodicals ===
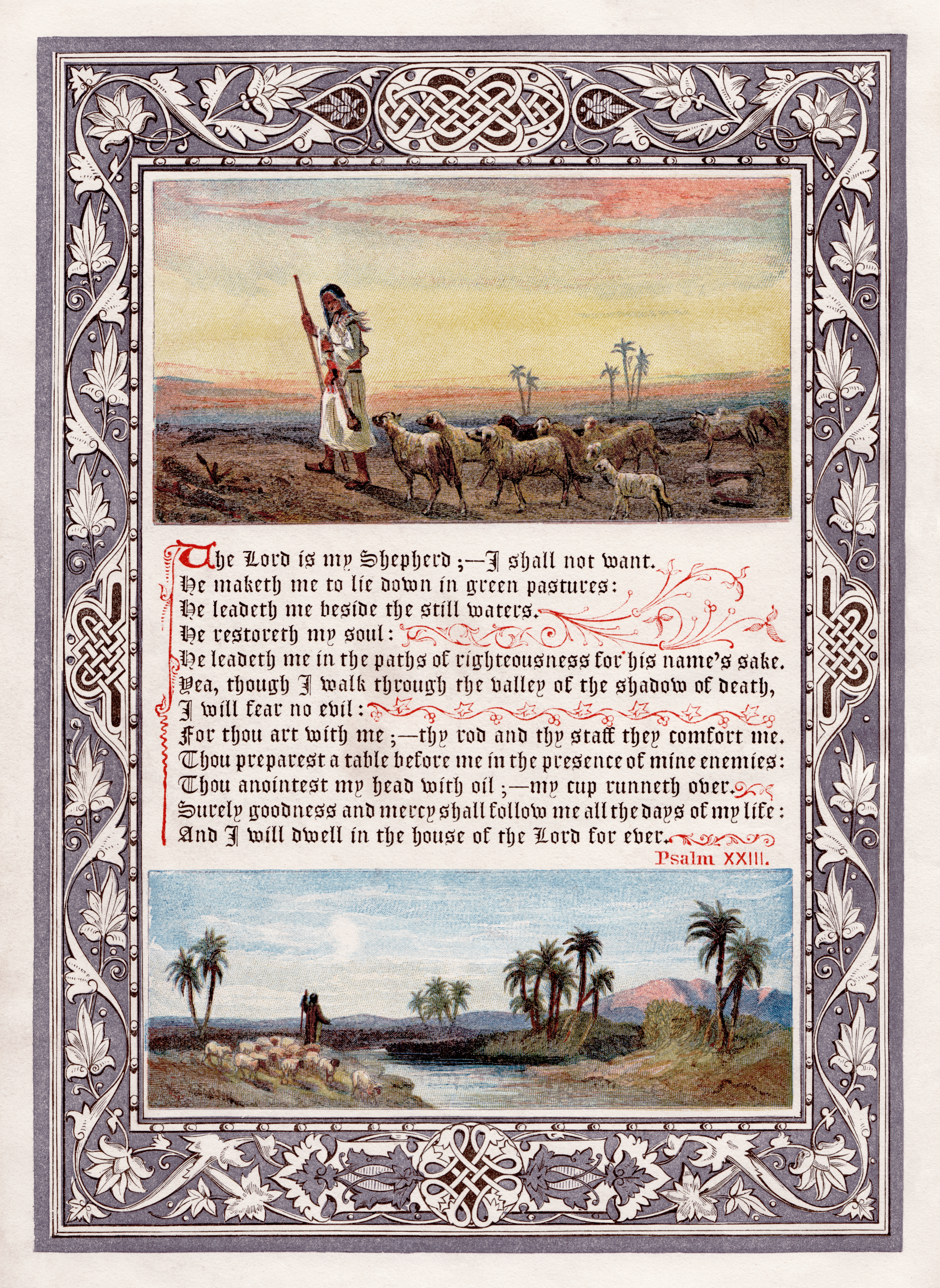
Illustration from 1880 issue of The Sunday at Home, a magazine published by the RTS.

The earliest periodicals published by the society were Child's Companion; or, Sunday scholar's reward and Tract Magazine; or Christian Miscellany. Both debuted in 1824, and were issued monthly at a price of 1 penny, the former aimed at Sunday school students, and the latter at their parents. They had monthly sales of 28,250 and 17,000, respectively.

=== Books ===
The society's books were mostly small but did include larger works such as the multi-volume Devotional Commentary and the massive Analytical Concordance to the Bible of Robert Young.

In the 1840s, the society distributed 23 million books to working class households.

From the 1860s, the Society began publishing novels aimed at women and children, providing a platform for a new generation of women writers, including Rosa Nouchette Carey. The Society also published reliegious tracts by women writers for use in overseas missions like the Missionary Birthday Book compiled by Lucy Currie, a missionary in Punjab, India. The Birthday book provided a daily passage for each day of the year with a bible verse, a hymn verse, and a piece of missionary history.

The society also published the notable novel, Pilgrim's Progress, by John Bunyan. They reproduced Pilgrim's Progress, in many formats including; penny parts, Sunday School prize additions, and cheap abridgments.

== Decline ==
Income from the sale of the society's books and periodicals went into a decline in the 1890s. A report issued by the society attributed this to a "general depression [which] has severely affected the book trade", though no such depression existed. Historian Aileen Fyfe attributes the decline to an increase in competition, and a decline in the influence of Christian evangelism and in the demand for religious literature. As the society entered the 20th century, its operations contracted. It reduced the funding it provided for foreign missionary work, and in 1930 reorganized all its operations into a single building. In the inter-war period, tract circulation had declined to one million, its lowest level since 1806.

In 1932, a new imprint, Lutterworth Press, was formed, under which most of the society's subsequent publications appeared.

In 1935, the society merged with the Christian Literature Society for India and Africa, later also incorporating the Christian Literature Society for China in 1941. The resulting entity was the United Society for Christian Literature, which, as of 2006, was continuing its mission, largely in the form of overseas missionary work.

== Works ==
- Address to an emigrant (1839)
- William Tyndale No. 990 (1839)
- Mamma and her Child (1843)
- The Oldest Fisherman the World Ever Saw, and Other Stories (1879)
- The Cup and the Kiss (1888)
- Adopted, or An Old Soldier's Embarrassments (circa 1891)
- Wallaby Hill (1880s-1890s)
- By-paths of Bible Knowledge (1884-1904)
- The Jew (circa 1890)
- Homes and Haunts of the Pilgrim Fathers (1899)
- The Egyptian (circa 1900)
- The Isles of Scilly: Their Story, their folk, & their Flowers (1910)

== Book series ==
The R.T.S. issued a number of book series during the 19th and 20th centuries. Many of them were listed in the Society's catalogues.

- The Anecdote Series
- Bouverie Historical Stories
- Bouverie Series of Penny Stories
- The Boy's Own Bookshelf
- Broad Sheets
- Burder's Village Sermons
- By-Paths of Bible Knowledge
- Cennick's Sermons
- Christian Classics
- Comments on Scripture
- Cottage Sermons
- First Series Tracts
- The Flower Patch Books (by Flora Klickmann); republished in abbreviated form as The Flower Patch Booklets
- The Girl's Own Bookshelf
- Half Penny Story Books
- Hand Bills
- Large Broad Sheets
- Little Dot Series
- The Little Library of Biography
- Narrative Series
- Nation Story Readers
- New Biographical Series
- One Half Penny Book Series
- Pamphlet series
- The Pen and Pencil Series
- Penny Tales for the People
- Picture Books for Little Children
- Present Day Primers
- Present Day Tracts
- R.T.S. Books for the People, also known as: R.T.S. 1d. Penny Books for the People
- The R.T.S. Library
- Sandringham Series of Penny Stories
- Sea Sermons
- Second Series Tracts
- Select Sermons
- Sermons for the Ages
- Short Biographies for the People
- Six-Penny Toy Books
- The Sunflowers Series of Stories for All Readers
- Sunshine Readers
- Threepenny Book Series
- Two Pence Book Series
- Welsh, Irish, Gaelic, and Foreign Tracts of the Religious Tract Society

== See also ==
- American Tract Society
- Clapham Sect
- Ebenezer Henderson
- Francis William Bourdillon
- History of Christian Missions
- George Mogridge (Old Humphrey) – one of the Society's most popular and prolific authors
- Miss Clack
