= Francis Boott =

American physician and botanist (1792–1863)

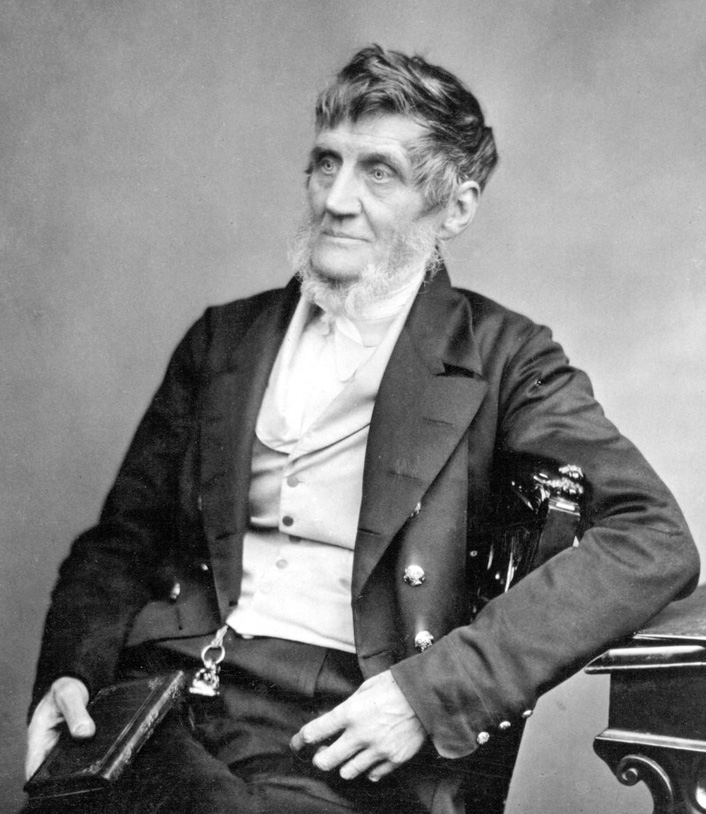
Francis Boott

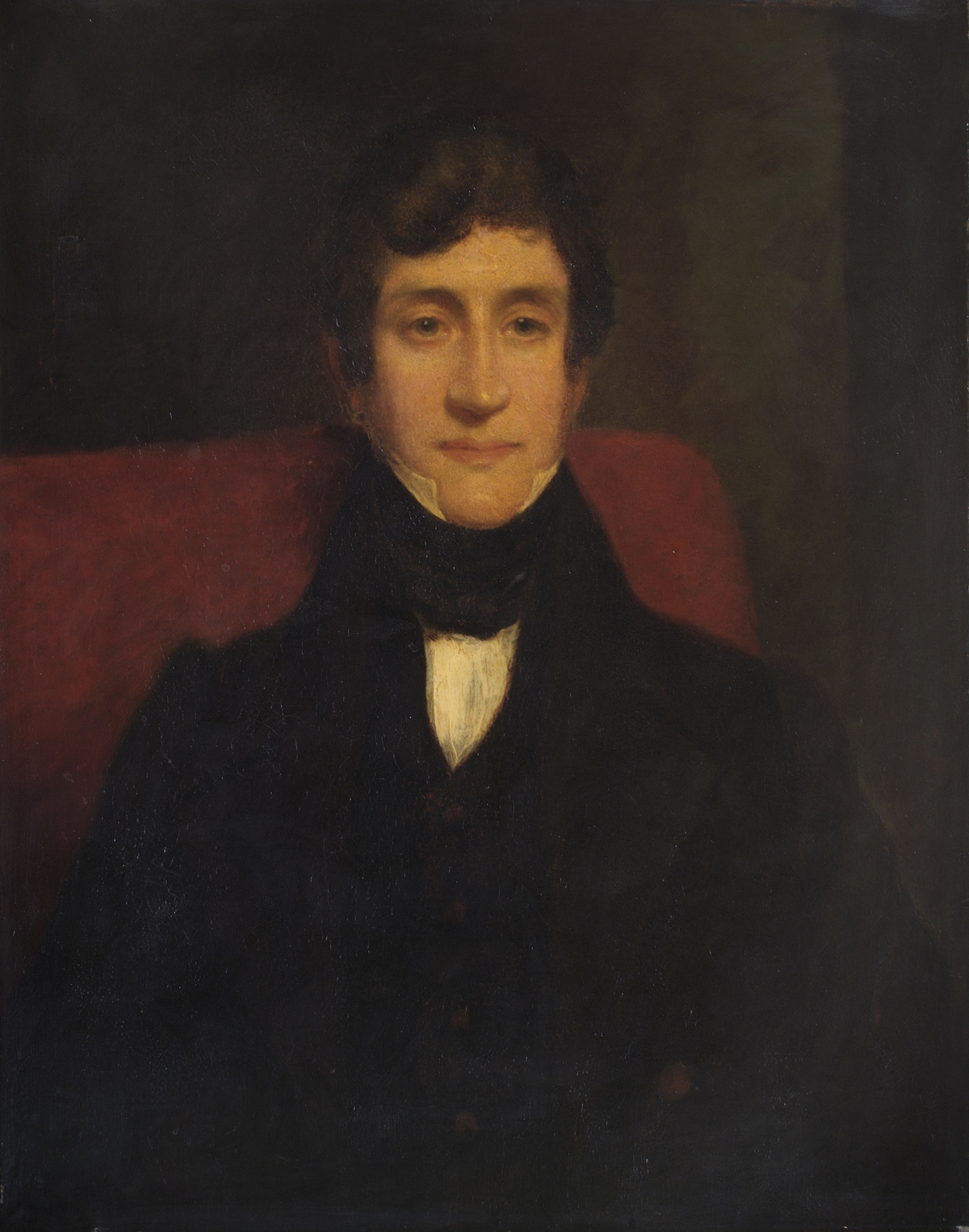
Francis Boott by Eden Upton Eddis (fragment, 1840)

Francis Boott (26 September 1792 – 25 December 1863) was an American medical doctor and botanist who was resident in Great Britain from 1820.

== Biography ==
Boott was born in Boston, Massachusetts, the brother of Kirk Boott, one of the founders of Lowell, Massachusetts. Kirk Boott's father (born in Derby, England, 1750-1817), was also called Kirk Boott. He had emigrated to the United States from England in 1783, and worked in Boston as a wholesale merchant.

Boott entered Harvard College in 1806, and graduated in 1810 with honors. At age 19, he moved to Derby in England apparently with the intention of becoming a merchant, where he spent three years, and became interested in botany. He returned to America in 1814 for family reasons and while there embarked upon a number of botanical expeditions.

About 1820, he determined upon studying medicine, and placed himself under the tutelage of Dr. John Armstrong in London. Thence he removed to Edinburgh, where he took his doctor's degree in 1824. On his return to London in 1825 he commenced practice, and accepted the lectureship on botany in the Webb street school of medicine; this chair however, though admirably conducted, he did not long hold. At the dying request of his friend Dr. Armstrong he edited his life. This book bears the following title: Memorials of the Life and Medical Opinions of John Armstrong, M.D. To which is added an Enquir into the facts connected with those forms of devel' attributed to malaria or marsh eflluvium, by Francis Boott, M.D., 1833-34, two volumes.

For seven years Boott practised very successfully in London, being especially noted for his treatment of fevers, in which he followed the practice of giving abundance of air to the patient, a course which at that time was vehemently objected to by the profession at large. In other respects, too, he was a judicious innovator, being one of the first to discard the black coat, white neckcloth, kneebreeches, and black silk stockings, for the ordinary costume of the day. This was then a blue coat with brass buttons, and yellow waistcoat, which he continued to wear to the last; and thus by outliving the fashion, as he had forestalled it, he came to be as well known in 1860 as he had been in 1830. Boott was elected an Associate Fellow of the American Academy of Arts and Sciences in 1835.

He retired from practice, and devoted himself for the last thirty-five years of his life to the cultivation of his literary, classical, and scientific tastes. He retained his interest in medicine, however, and wrote to The Lancet in 1846 when he heard from his friend Jacob Bigelow about the use of ether as an anaesthetic in America. The first use of ether as an anaesthetic in Britain (for a dental procedure) was in his house at 24 Gower Street on 19 December 1846. This is commemorated by a plaque on the London School of Hygiene and Tropical Medicine which now stands on the site. A few days later a surgical operation under ether was carried out by Robert Liston at University College Hospital nearby.

As far back as 1819 he had become a fellow of the Linnean Society, and his leisure now permitted him to accept the office of secretary, which he held from 1832 to 1839. He was appointed treasurer in November 1856, which place he resigned in May 1861, his botanical labours were entirely confined to the study of the great genus Carex. The results of his labours have seen the light in a large folio work entitled Illustrations of the Genus Carex, by F. Boott, M.D. In four parts London, 1858-67. It was produced at his own expense, and distributed amongst botanists.

His close attention to study tended to enfeeble his never very vigorous frame; but the immediate cause of his death was disease of the right lung, induced by pneumonia at 24 Gower Street, London, on 25 December 1863.

In connection with literature a most characteristic act of his was to erect in All Saints' Church, Cambridge, a tablet to the memory of Henry Kirke White, of whom he knew nothing personally, but whose life and poems he ardently admired. In addition to the works already mentioned Boott also published 'Two Lectures on Materia Medica' in 1837, and he prepared a monograph of 158 species of Carex, which was printed in Sir William Jackson Hooker's 'Flora Boreali-Americana'.

== Family ==
His wife was Mary Hardcastle of Derby; they married in 1820. Her mother, Lucy Hardcastle nee Swift, lived in the same street as Erasmus Darwin and was educated by him along with Darwin's two illegitimate daughters. She later published a book about the Linnean classification and ran a school for young ladies.

== Sources ==
- Anonymous. "Francis Boott, M.D." Proceedings of the American Academy of Arts and Sciences. 6: 305-308, 1865.
- Ellis RH. (1977) The introduction of ether anaesthesia to Great Britain. 2. A biographical sketch of Dr. Francis Boott. Anaesthesia 32:197-208.
- Gray, A. "Francis Boott, M.D." American Journal of Science and Arts, series II. 37: 288-292, 1864.
- Welch, Charles Alfred (ca. 1902), "Welch Genealogy", section Boott Family: 61-66. Online Open Library
