= Hedges (surname) =

Hedges is an English surname. Notable people with the surname include:

- Andrew H. Hedges (born 1966), American church historian
- Anthony Hedges (1931–2019), British composer
- Ariel Serena Hedges Bowen (1863–1904), American writer
- Austin Hedges (born 1992), American professional baseball player
- Benjamin Hedges (1907–1969), American athlete
- Bernard Hedges (1927–2014), Welsh cricketer
- Carol Hedges, British writer
- Charles Hedges (1649–1714), English judge
- Charlie Hedges (born 1986), radio presenter and DJ
- Chris Hedges (born 1956), American journalist
- Chuck Hedges (1932–2010), American jazz clarinetist
- Elaine Ryan Hedges (1927–1997), American feminist
- F. A. Mitchell-Hedges (1882–1959), British explorer and writer
- Florence Hedges (1878–1956), American plant pathologist and botanist
- Fred Paul Hedges (1921–1999), American guitar maker
- Frederick Hedges (1903–1989), Canadian rower
- Frederick William Hedges (1896–1954), British soldier
- George Hedges (1952–2009), American lawyer
- James Hedges (1938–2024), American prohibitionist
- Jane Hedges (born 1956), Anglican priest
- Jared Hedges (born 1980), American screenwriter
- Jimmy Hedges (1942–2014), American wood carver and art dealer
- Job E. Hedges (1862–1925), American lawyer and politician from New York
- Joe Hedges (born 1980), American musician and visual artist
- John C. Hedges, American football coach
- John Hedges (English politician, died 1562)
- John Hedges (English politician, died 1737), MP for Mitchell, Fowey and Bossiney
- John Hedges (died 2012), musician with Carol Lou Trio
- John Hedges (British governor), first acting governor of British East Florida, 20–30 July 1763
- John Hedges (archaeologist), British archaeologist and editor of British Archaeological Reports
- John Hedges (boxer) (born 2002), English boxer
- Larry V. Hedges, American statistician
- Lee Hedges (1929–2023), American football coach
- Lionel Hedges (1900–1933), English amateur first-class cricketer
- Lucas Hedges (born 1996), American actor
- Mark Hedges (born 1964), British journalist
- Martyn Hedges (died 1992), British canoeist
- Matt Hedges (born 1990), American soccer player
- Matthew Hedges (born 1986/87), British academic
- Michael Hedges (1953–1997), American guitarist
- Mike Hedges (born 1954), British record producer
- Peter Hedges (born 1962), American writer
- Robert E. M. Hedges (born 1944), British archaeologist
- Robert Hedges (colonial administrator), British administrator
- Robert Hedges (baseball) (1869–1932), American baseball executive
- Robert Yorke Hedges (1903–1963), British expatriate judge who was Chief Justice of Sarawak from 1946 to 1951
- Robbie Hedges, chief of the Peoria tribe of Indians of Oklahoma
- Ryan Hedges (born 1995), Welsh footballer
- Sid G. Hedges (1897–1974), British author
- Stephen Blair Hedges, (born 1957), American evolutionary biologist
- William Hedges (colonial administrator) (1632–1701), British merchant
- William Hedges (Australian politician) (1856–1935), Australian politician
- William Hedges (New South Wales politician) (1881–1962), Australian politician
- William Hedges-White, 3rd Earl of Bantry (1801–1884), Anglo-Irish Conservative peer
- Zoah Hedges-Stocks, English journalist

== Fiction ==
- Reverend Hedges, fictional character in Wallace and Gromit

== See also ==
- Hedge (surname)
- Hedge (disambiguation)
