= John Hedges =

John Hedges may refer to:

- John C. Hedges, American football coach
- John Hedges (English politician, died 1562)
- John Hedges (English politician, died 1737), MP for Mitchell, Fowey and Bossiney
- John Hedges, musician with Carol Lou Trio
- John Hedges (British governor), first acting governor of British East Florida, 20–30 July 1763
- John Hedges (archaeologist), British archaeologist, editor of British Archaeological Reports
- John Hedges (boxer), English boxer, born 2002

== See also ==
- Hedges (surname)
