= Yelvington =

Yelvington may refer to:

- Yelvington, Florida
- Yelvington, Kentucky
- Yelvington (surname)
