= Robert Hedges =

Robert Hedges may refer to:

- Robert Hedges (colonial administrator), President of Bengal, 1713–1718
- Robert Hedges (baseball) (1869–1932), American baseball team owner
- Robert E. M. Hedges, British archaeologist
- Robert Yorke Hedges (1903–1963), British expatriate judge who was Chief Justice of Sarawak from 1946 to 1951
- Robbie Hedges, chief of the Peoria tribe of Indians of Oklahoma
