= Hedge (disambiguation) =

A hedge is a line of closely spaced shrubs planted to act as a barrier or boundary.

Hedge or Hedges may also refer to:

== Places ==
- Hedges, California, a former mining town in Imperial County, California, United States
- Hedging, Somerset, a location in England
- Hedges, Washington, unincorporated community in Benton County, Washington, United States
- The Hedges, a historic building in New York state

== People and fictional characters ==
- Hedge (surname), a surname (including a list of people and fictional characters)
- Hedges (surname), a surname (including a list of people and fictional characters)
- Hedge Thompson (1780–1828), American politician from New Jersey
- Hedges Eyre Chatterton (1819–1910), Irish politician
- Hedges Worthington-Eyre (1899–1979), British sprinter
- Hedge (character), a fictional character in the Old Kingdom series of novels

== Other uses ==
- Hedge (finance), an investment made to limit loss
  - Hedge fund, a type of investment fund
- Hedge (linguistics), intentionally noncommittal or ambiguous sentence fragments
- Maclura pomifera or Osage orange tree, often called a hedge in the United States

== See also ==
- Edge (disambiguation)
- Henge (disambiguation)
