= Henge (disambiguation) =

Henges are neolithic earthworks.

Henge may also refer to:

== Arts and culture ==
- Henge (film) (Japanese: へんげ, romanized: Henge, lit. 'Metamorphosis'), 2012 Japanese horror film
- henge (変化, へんげ), a Japanese folklore monster, a form of Yōkai
- Henge (band), a British band
- Henge, a work of Scottish artist David Harding

== Other uses ==
- Fredrik Henge (born 1974), Swedish golfer
- "The Henge", a WWII structure in Poland linked to Die Glocke urban myth

== See also ==
- The dictionary definition of 変化 at Wiktionary
- ringfort
- stone circle
- circular ditch
- circular rampart
- Stonehenge, England, UK
- Woodhenge, England, UK
- Carhenge, Nebraska, USA
- Category:Henges
- Hedge (disambiguation)
- Henshin (disambiguation), including 変身, へんしん (transformation, metamorphosis)
