= Carol Lou Trio =

Jazz combo

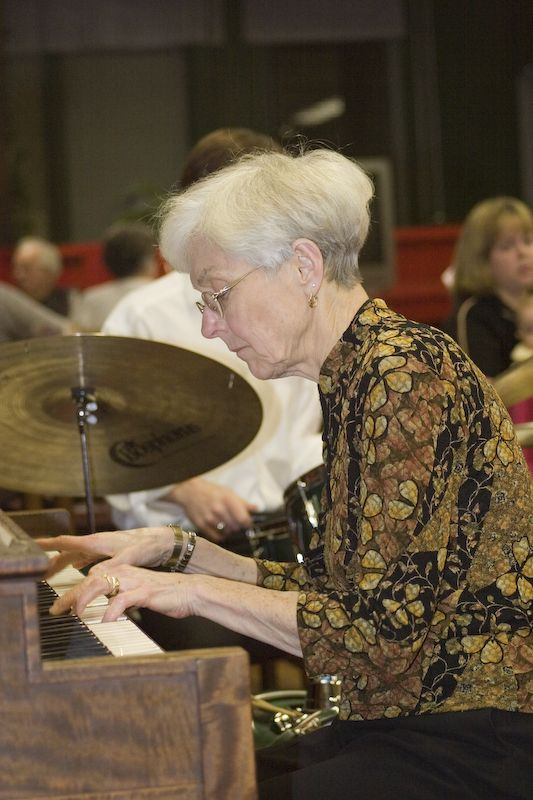
- Jazz pianist Carol Lou Woodward, Richmond, Indiana, 2006

Background information
- Origin: Richmond, Indiana
- Genre: Jazz
- Years active: 1950s–1970s
- Label: Parker
- Past members: Carol Lou Hedges; John Hedges; Harold Jones; Jim Parker

The Carol Lou Trio was a jazz combo which gained modest popularity in the mid-eastern United States between the 1950s and 1970s, and international distribution of its few recordings. The group was headed by Carol Lou Hedges (born May 20, 1931, Peru, Indiana), whose modest demeanor belied her piano virtuosity and swinging style. Husband and bassist John Hedges was the other permanent member of the group, with various drummers having been employed, including future drummer for the Count Basie band and Tony Bennett, Harold Jones in 1956–57. The trio's reputation spread mostly by word of mouth, but it did release several singles and one album.

Having remarried, Carol Lou Woodward continued to play as a soloist and in small combos in and around her home since 1957, Richmond, Indiana, where Gennett Records produced important early jazz recordings, including the first by Louis Armstrong. In 2013 Woodward recorded an album for the Starr-Gennett Foundation called “Rags to Richmond: A Tribute to Ragtime and Starr Piano.” The album includes three compositions by erstwhile Richmond resident May Aufderheide, a leading female ragtime composer.

In 2006, Woodward released a CD featuring solo piano arrangements of jazz and popular music standards, "An Evening With Carol Lou". In 2008 she released a holiday collection titled “Christmas With Carol Lou."

She has said that her favorite pianist is Gene Harris, whose style has been described as "hard-swinging, soulful, blues-drenched". Woodward's considerable talent might have carried her to greater recognition, but she chose instead to raise a family and live quietly.

John Hedges died on October 19, 2012, at the age of 84.

Now in her nineties, Carol Lou is a weekly entertainer at Saigon Paris Bistro, in Fort Myers, Florida.

== Discography ==
The Carol Lou Trio

Album
The Carol Lou Trio and Geneta Kern
Painting The Town (Parker Records LP 33-102) 1967

Side 1

- "Tricky"
- "Little Things Mean A Lot"
- "On Green Dolphin Street"
- "Kansas City"
- "Cast Your Fate To The Wind"
- "I'm Gonna A Build A Mountain"

Side 2

- "Hello Dolly" (feat. Geneta Kern)
- "The In Crowd"
- "If I Should Lose You"
- "Imagination" (feat. Geneta Kern)
- "Big Noise From Winnetka"
- "When I Fall In Love"

Personnel: Carol Lou Hedges, piano; John Hedges, bass; Jim Parker, drums; Geneta Kern, vocals.

Singles (Released in the 1970s)

1. "Soft Summer Breeze" (Eddie Heywood-Judy Spencer)/Canadian Sunset (Norman Gimbel-Eddie Heywood) Juke JB2013A; "After Hours" (Erskine Hawkins-Avery Parrish) Juke JB2013B
2. "T.D. Boogie Woogie" (Tommy Dorsey) Juke JB 2022A; "Lullaby of Birdland" (George Shearing) Juke JB2022B
3. "Big Noise From Winnetka" (Ray Bauduc-Bob Haggart) Juke JB20021A; "When I Fall in Love" (Edward Heyman-Victor Young) Juke JB20021B

Carol Lou Woodward

An Evening With Carol Lou (2006, privately issued CD)

1. "I Got Rhythm" (George Gershwin)
2. "Someone to Watch Over Me" (Gershwin)
3. "Rhapsody in Blue" (Gershwin)
4. "Embraceable You" (Gershwin)
5. "12th Street Rag" (Euday L. Bowman)
6. "Just Squeeze Me" (Duke Ellington-Lee Gaines)
7. "Spring is Here"/"It Might as Well Be Spring" (Richard Rodgers)
8. "Stardust" (Hoagy Carmichael)
9. "Kitten on the Keys" (Zez Confrey)
10. "Quiet Nights"/"How Insensitive" (Antonio Carlos Jobim, Norman Gimbel, Mendonca/Jobim, Gimbel, Vinicius de Moraes)
11. "Linus and Lucy" (Vince Guaraldi)
12. "That's All" (Alan Brandt-Bob Haymes)

Christmas with Carol Lou (2008, privately issued CD)

1. "It's The Most Wonderful Time Of The Year" (Edward Pola-George Wyle)
2. "Jingle Bell Rock" (Bobby Helms)
3. "Invention In F Major" (Bach) and "We Need A Little Christmas" (Jerry Herman)
4. "Jesu, Joy of Man's Desiring" (Johann Sebastian Bach)
5. "Winter Wonderland" (Felix Bernard-Richard B. Smith)
6. "God Rest Ye Merry Gentlemen" (Traditional)
7. "We Wish You The Merriest" (Les Brown)
8. "Snowfall" (Claude Thornhill)
9. "Sleigh Ride" (Leroy Anderson)
10. "Have A Merry Merry Merry Christmas"
11. Medley: "In The Bleak Of Winter" (Traditional), "Bring A Torch" (Bring a Torch, Jeanette, Isabella (Traditional and Charpentier), "The Holly And Ivy" (Traditional)
12. "Christmas Time Is Here" (Lee Mendelson-Vince Guaraldi)
13. "Have Yourself A Merry Little Christmas" (Hugh Martin-Ralph Blane)

Personnel: Carol Lou Woodward, piano; Greg Hedges, bass

Rags to Richmond: A Tribute to Ragtime and Starr Piano (2103 CD, Starr-Gennett Foundation)

1. "A Totally Different Rag" (May Aufderheide)
2. "Boyer Street Rag" (G. Anderson)
3. "(Original) Chicago Blues" (J. White)
4. "Echoes From the Snowball Club" (Harry P. Guy)
5. "Encore Rag" (T. Fischer)
6. "Extroversion" (G. Angerson)
7. "Felix Rag" (H. H. McSkimming)
8. "Hoosier Rag" (Julia Lee Niebergall)
9. "Jungle Time Rag" (E. P. Severin)
10. "Kitten on the Keys" (Zez Confrey)
11. "Majestic Rag" (B. Rawls and R. Neel)
12. "Prosperity Rag" (James Scott (composer)
13. "Richmond Rag "(May Aufderheide)
14. "The Thriller!" (May Aufderheide)
