= Bishop Fenwick High School (Franklin, Ohio) =

School in Franklin, Ohio, United States

Location
- 4855 State Route 122; Franklin, (Warren County), Ohio 45005; United States; 39°29′32″N 84°17′43″W

Information
- School type: private Coed
- Motto: To reach the heights, aim high
- Religious affiliation: Catholic
- Established: 1952
- Oversight: Archdiocese of Cincinnati
- Principal: Steven Herbert
- Teaching staff: 37.2 (on an FTE basis)
- Grades: 9–12
- Gender: coed
- Enrollment: 506 (2019–20)
- Student to teacher ratio: 13.6
- Campus size: 66 acres
- Colors: Crimson and Gold
- Song: Notre Dame Victory March
- Athletics conference: Greater Catholic League
- Mascot: Falcon
- Team name: Falcons
- Rival: Archbishop Alter, Stephen T. Badin
- Accreditation: North Central Association of Colleges and Schools
- Newspaper: The Fenwick Connection, "The Liberator"
- Yearbook: Turres
- Website: www.fenwickfalcons.org

Bishop Fenwick High School is a parochial high school in Franklin, Ohio, USA.

== History ==
The school was opened August 21, 1952 and named in honor of Edward Dominic Fenwick, a Dominican friar and first Catholic Bishop of Cincinnati. The first principal was Rev. Julian Krusling. Due to outgrowing the original site, the school moved on November 20, 1962 to Manchester Road in Middletown. The growth continued and in September 2004 the school moved to a new campus, on State Road 122 on the east side of Middletown.

== Academics ==
The curriculum is accredited by the Ohio Department of Education and the Ohio Catholic School Accrediting Association. Curriculum levels are Advanced College Preparatory study, College Preparatory and General Studies.

== Clubs and activities ==
Fenwick offers many clubs including:

- Academic Team
- Ambassadors
- Art Club
- Drama Club
- Fenwick For Life
- French Club
- Hope Club
- Intramural Basketball
- Key Club
- Liturgical Ministries
- Liturgical Musicians
- Medical Club
- Mock Trial
- National Honors Society
- Ohio Math League
- Peer Mentors
- Radio Club
- Robotics Club
- Run Club
- Ski and Snowboard Club
- Spanish Club
- Spanish Honors Society
- Student Council
- Tech Club
- Ukulele Club

== Athletics ==
Fenwick's sports teams are sanctioned by the Ohio High School Athletic Association. The boys teams compete in the Greater Catholic League. The girls teams compete in the Girls' Greater Cincinnati League.

Fenwick offers the following fall sports:

- Marching Band
- Cheer
- Cross Country
- Football
- Golf
- Soccer
- Tennis
- Volleyball

=== Ohio High School Athletic Association State Championships ===
- Football – 1973, 1974
- Baseball – 1974, 1981
- Boys' basketball – 1982
- Boys' volleyball – 2026
- Girls' track and field – 1993
- Girls' soccer – 2008, 2012
- Girls' volleyball – 2010, 2019, 2026

==== Other Non-Sanctioned State Championships ====
- Boys' volleyball – 2013, 2021 Prior to 2022–2023 boys' volleyball was sanctioned by the Ohio High School Boys Volleyball Association rather than the OHSAA.

== Notable alumni ==
- Tim Jorden – former NFL tight end for the Arizona Cardinals, Pittsburgh Steelers, and San Francisco 49ers
- Joe Hedges - lead singer of the alt-rock band July for Kings
