= Gladys Yelvington =

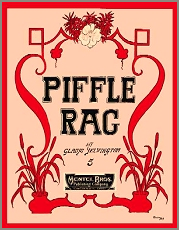
Gladys Yelvington's "Piffle Rag" from 1911

Gladys E. Yelvington (Parsons) (November 29, 1891 – February 11, 1957) was an American ragtime composer and friend of May Aufderheide and Julia Lee Niebergall. She was born in Elwood, Indiana, to Asa and Alice Yelvington.

She composed and performed as a silent-movie pianist in Indianapolis and Alexandria.

She returned to Elwood in 1910, and performed regularly at the Princess Theatre. In 1912 she married Leo G. Parsons (1887–1958), a cigar salesman, in Elwood in 1912. This ended her professional music career. They moved to Gary, Indiana, in 1917, where she died in 1957.

== "Piffle Rag" ==
Her only surviving published composition is "Piffle Rag", published by J.H. Aufderheide in 1911 and Mentel Bros in 1914.

It has been recorded by pianists Max Morath, Virginia Eskin, and Nancy Fierro.

Remy Charlip choreographed his "air mail dance" Garden Lilacs, set to "Piffle Rag". It was performed by Betsy Kagan in San Francisco in 1991.
