= Cecil Duane Crabb =

American composer of ragtime music (1890–1953)

- Born: May 23, 1890; Centerville, Indiana
- Died: April 27, 1953 (aged 62); Wisconsin
- Burial place: Crown Hill Cemetery and Arboretum, Section 3, Lot 51
- Occupation: Composer

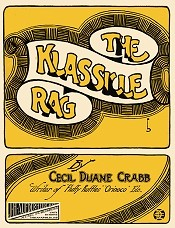
The Klassicle rag.jpg

Cecil Duane Crabb (May 23, 1890 – April 27, 1953) was an American composer of ragtime music and a member of Indianapolis group of ragtime composers.

He was born in Centerville, Indiana to James and Sarah E. Crabb. He moved to Indianapolis in 1908. Crabb composed only four, albeit significant, ragtime pieces. His best known rag, Fluffy Ruffles, was written in 1907.

After a roller-skating accident, Crabb was taken in by E.D. Staley and his wife, who discovered his propensity for graphic arts. Mr. Staley set him up in a sign-making shop to help him attain financial stability. During that time, he made friends with May Aufderheide and helped her get her piece, "Dusty Rag", into print. Because of these efforts, her father, John Henry Aufderheide, started a publishing company to publish ragtime by Indianapolis composers, and hired Crabb for cover design. Crabb designed the covers for various composers published by the company, such as May Aufderheide and Will B. Morrison. He also published a few pieces of his own with the firm.

He was the co-owner of the sign business Staley and Crabb, now know as Staley Signs, for many years. He died in Wisconsin at the age of 62 and was buried at Crown Hill Cemetery in Indianapolis. He had three children, one of whom became Brig. General Cecil D. Crabb.

== List of compositions ==
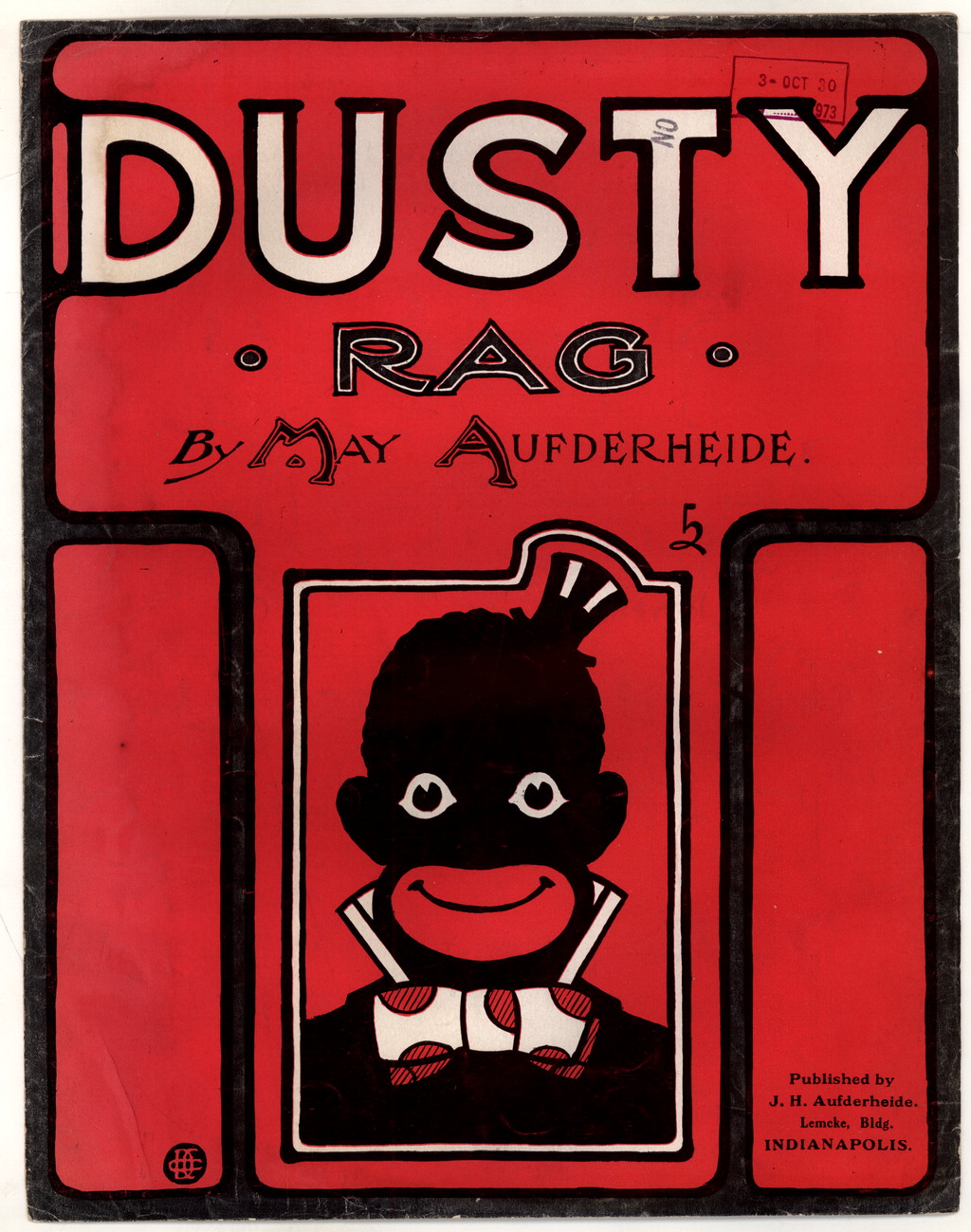
Crabb designed the cover for May Aufderheide's Dusty Rag

- Fluffy Ruffles - Two Step (1907)
- Orinoco (1909)
- Trouble (1909, with Will B. Morrison)
- The Klassicle Rag (1911)
