= Country Life (magazine) =

British weekly glossy magazine

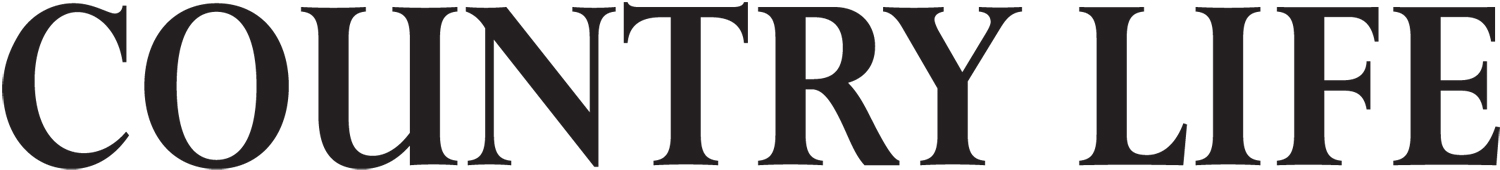

- Cover of 18 September 2024 issue
- Editor: Mark Hedges
- Former editors: See editors section below
- Categories: Lifestyle (rural)
- Frequency: Weekly
- Circulation: 39,257 (ABC Jan – Dec 2015); Print and digital editions
- Publisher: Future plc
- Founded: 1897; 129 years ago
- Country: United Kingdom
- Based in: London
- Website: www.countrylife.co.uk
- ISSN: 0045-8856

Country Life (stylised in all caps) is a British weekly perfect-bound glossy magazine, launched in 1897, that is published by Future plc. Originally based in Tavistock Street, Covent Garden, it was latterly based at 110 Southwark Street until 2016, when it moved to Farnborough, Hampshire. In 2022, the magazine moved back to London at 121–141 Westbourne Terrace, Paddington.

== History ==
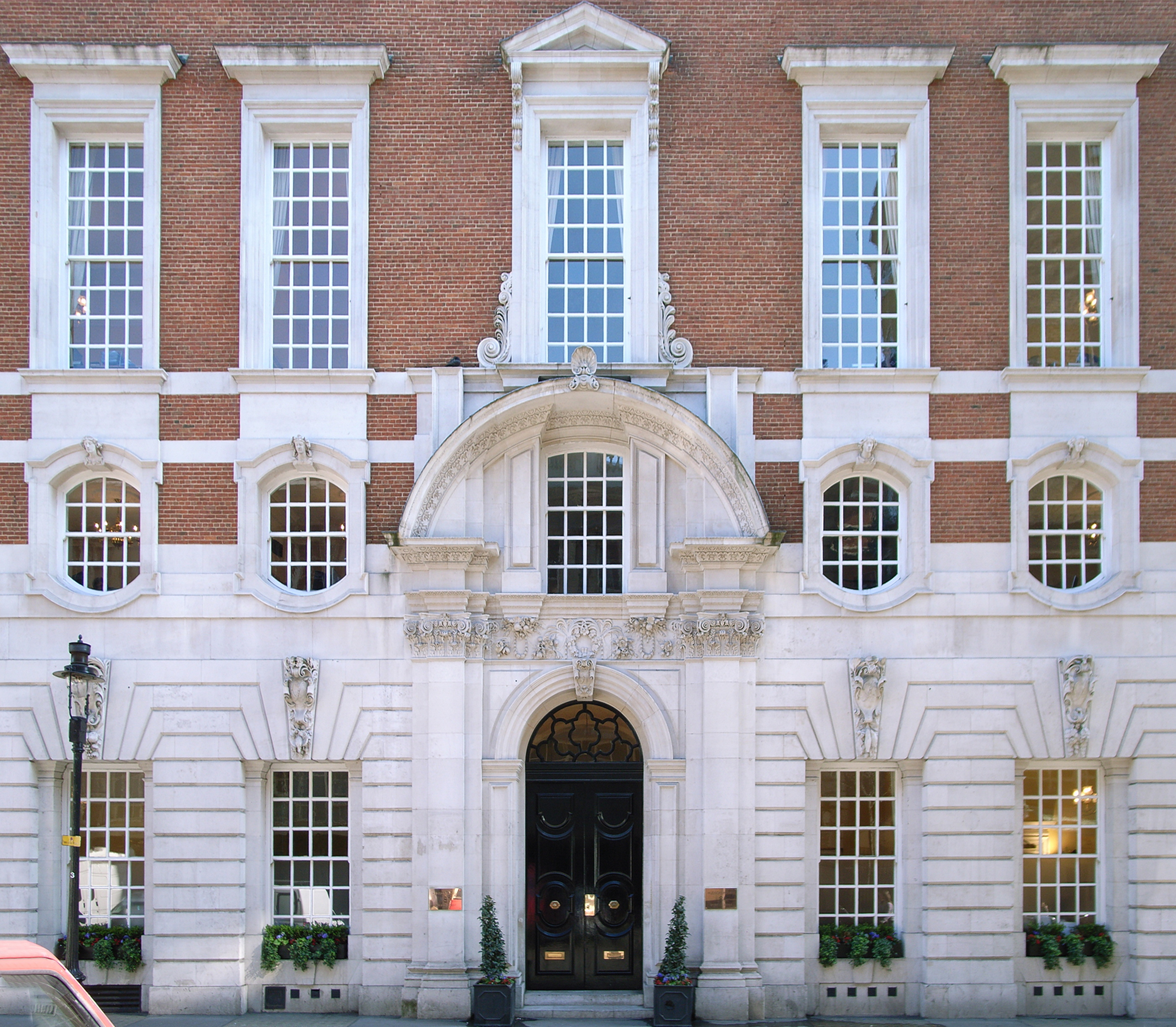
Hudson House, the former Country Life offices in Tavistock Street, London. Designed by Edwin Lutyens and built in 1904.

Country Life was launched in 1897, incorporating Racing Illustrated. At this time it was owned by Edward Hudson, the owner of Lindisfarne Castle and various Lutyens-designed houses including The Deanery in Sonning; in partnership with George Newnes Ltd (in 1905 Hudson bought out Newnes). Originally based in a property leased from the Duke of Bedford, in Tavistock Street, Covent Garden, it was replaced in 1903 by a purpose-built Lutyens-designed building at 2–10 Tavistock Street, now a Grade II listed building, known as Hudson House.

At that time golf and racing served as its main content, as well as the property coverage, initially of manorial estates, which is still such a large part of the magazine. Elizabeth Bowes-Lyon, the late Queen Mother, used to appear frequently on its front cover. Now the magazine covers a range of subjects, from gardens and gardening to country house architecture, art and books, and property to rural issues, luxury products and interiors.

In 1997, the centenary of the magazine was celebrated by a special issue, the publishing of a book by Roy Strong, the broadcast of a BBC2 TV programme on a year in the life of the magazine, and staging a gold medal-winning garden at the Chelsea Flower Show. In 1999, the magazine launched a new website.

In 2007, the magazine celebrated its 110th anniversary with a special souvenir issue on 4 January. Since May 2008 the magazine has been issued each Wednesday, having been on sale each Thursday for the past 111 years.

In 2012, Country Life marked Queen Elizabeth II Diamond Jubilee by issuing a 370 pages special edition with a gold cover highlighting the unique photographs of the Queen and the 12 Prime Ministers during her reign. The special edition also included the usual coverage of British rural life, architecture, property and gardens. Editor Mark Hedges said that this was one of the biggest issues in Country Life's history.

In 2022, Country Life commemorated its 125th anniversary with a special issue published on 11 May 2022, which looked back over more than 6500 editions since its foundation, highlighting prominent houses, gardens, people and animals that defined its publication over the years. In recognition of the magazine's 125th milestone, Country Life also hosted a celebratory event at Claridge's hotel attended by notable prominent figures, including the Duchess of Cornwall.

== Topics ==
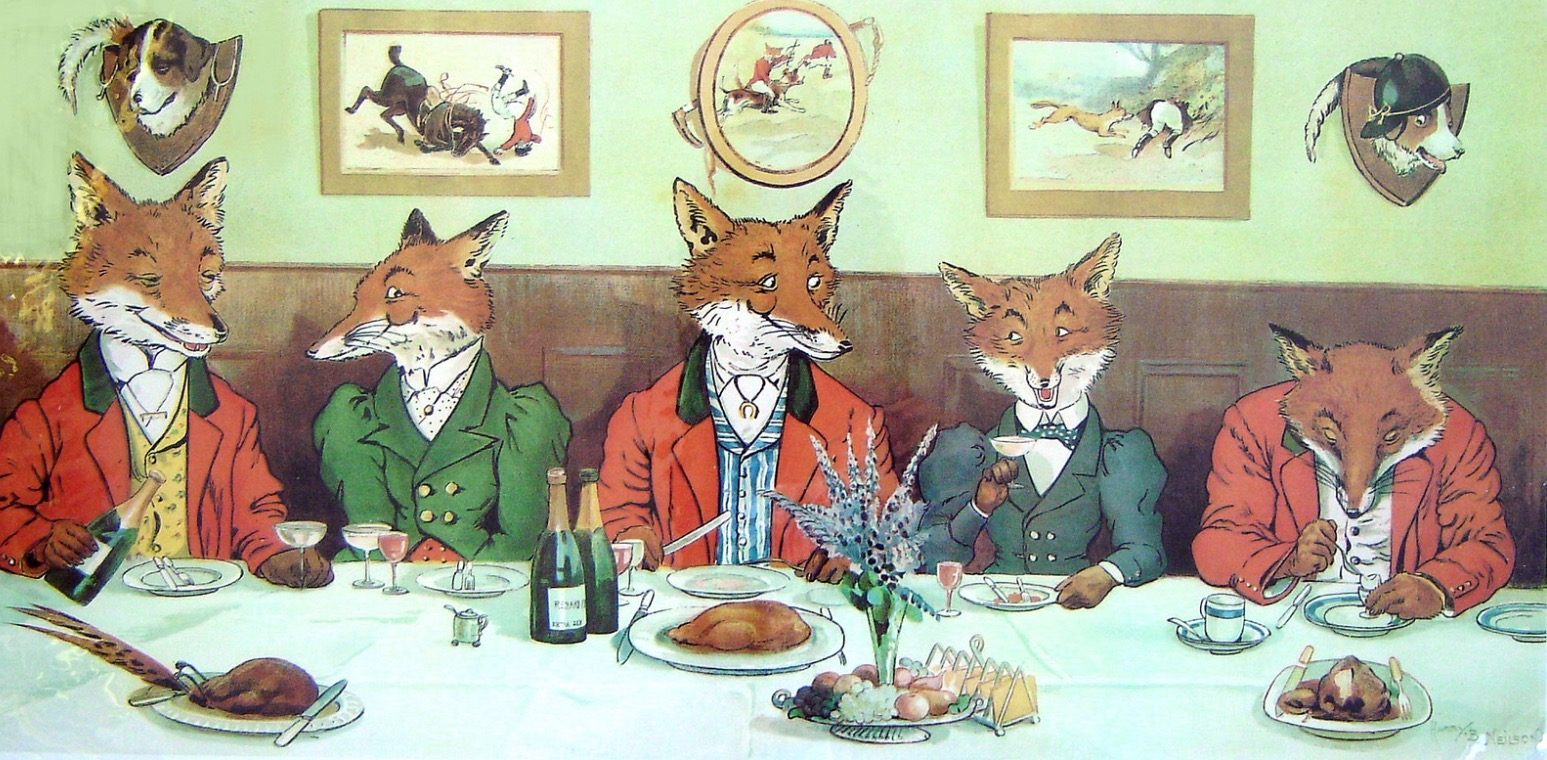
Harry B. Neilson's Mr Fox's Hunt Breakfast on Xmas Day (1897) appeared on the cover of Country Life in December 1997

The first several dozen pages of each issue are devoted to colour advertisements for upmarket residential property.

The magazine covers various aspects of rural life. It is primarily concerned with rural communities and their environments as well as the concerns of country dwellers and landowners and has a diverse readership which, although mainly UK based is also international.

The other rural pursuits and interests covered include hunting, shooting, farming, equestrian news and gardening and there are regular news and opinion pieces as well as rural politics. There are reviews of books, food and wine, art and architecture and antiques and crafts. Illustrative material includes the Tottering-by-Gently cartoon by Annie Tempest.

Feature articles have included Charles, Prince of Wales guest-editing an issue of Country Life in 2013, a historic revelation which revealed the true face of Shakespeare for the first time in 2015, and in 2016 an exclusive on where the Great Fire of London began in 1666. There was a special commemorative issue in June 2016 on the occasion of the Queen's 90th birthday.

== BBC documentary ==
In March 2016, Country Life was featured in a three-part documentary series produced by Spun Gold which aired on BBC2 called Land of Hope and Glory, British Country Life.

== Editors ==
- James Edmund Vincent 1897–1900
- Peter Anderson Graham 1900–1925
- W E Barber 1925–1933
- Christopher Hussey 1933–1940 (previously Architectural Editor)
- F Whitaker 1940–1958
- John Adams 1958–1973
- Michael Wright 1973–1984
- Marcus Binney 1984–1986 (previously Architectural Editor)
- Jenny Green 1986–1992
- Clive Aslet 1993–2006 (previously Deputy Editor, now Editor-at-Large)
- Mark Hedges 2006–present

Deputy editors:

- Clive Aslet 1989–1993 (previously architectural editor)
- Michael Hall 1998–2004 (previously architectural editor, current editor of Apollo)
- Jessica Fellowes 2004–2008
- Rupert Uloth 2008–2016
- Kate Green 2016–present

Architectural editors [dates as architectural writer]:

- provisionally Edward Hudson and James Edmund Vincent 1897–1900 / Peter Graham 1900–1907
- Henry Avray Tipping 1907–1910, 1916–1930 [1930–1933]
- Sir Lawrence Weaver 1910–1916
- Christopher Hussey 1930–1933, 1940–1964 [1921–1930]
- Arthur Oswald 1933–1940 [1928–1933, 1940–1969]
- Mark Girouard 1964–1967 [c. 1958–1964]
- John Cornforth 1967–1977 [c. 1960–1967, 1977 – c. 1990]
- Marcus Binney 1977–1984 [1968–1977]
- Clive Aslet 1984–1989 [1977–1984]
- Giles Worsley 1989–1994 [1985–1988]
- Michael Hall 1994–1998 [1989–1994]
- Jeremy Musson 1998–2007 [1995–1998]
- John Goodall 2007–present

Gardens editors:

- E.T. Cook [early 20th century]
- Tony Venison
- Tim Richardson 1995–1999
- Kathryn Bradley-Hole 2000–2018
- Tiffany Daneff 2018—

(Earlier versions cited Fred Whitsey as a gardens editor, but he was a distinguished contributor only, being the Editor of sister publication Popular Gardening)

== Notable contributors ==
- Christopher Lloyd (gardening)
- Bernard Darwin (grandson of Charles) (golf 1907–1961)
- Alethea Hayter (fashion editor 1933–38)
- Claude Scudamore Jarvis ("A Countryman's Notes", 1939–53)
- Gertrude Jekyll (gardening)
- Lucinda Lambton (architecture)
- John Martin Robinson (architecture)
- Gavin Stamp (architecture)
- Alistair John Rowan (architecture, before 1967)
- Tim Yeo (politics)
- Christina Broom (photographer)
- Alice Hughes (photographer, cover portraits, 1898–1909)

Staff architectural photographers:

- Charles Latham c1897–c1909
- Alfred E. Henson (1885–1972) 1917–57
- Alex Starkey 1953–87 (last staff photographer)

== See also ==
- Country Life books – from the photographic and article archives of Country Life magazine (mostly architectural)
- The Curious House Guest – a 2005–6 TV series by then Architectural Editor Jeremy Musson on visiting country houses
