= Soft Summer Breeze =

Single by Eddie Heywood

from the album Eddie Heywood
- B-side: "Heywood's Bounce"
- Released: April 19, 1956
- Genre: Jazz
- Length: 2:42
- Label: Mercury
- Songwriter(s): Eddie Heywood

Eddie Heywood singles chronology
"Land of Dreams" (1955)	"Soft Summer Breeze" (1956)	"The Continental (You Kiss While You're Dancing)" (1956)

"Soft Summer Breeze" is a song written and performed by Eddie Heywood. It reached No. 11 on the U.S. pop chart in 1956. The song was featured on his 1955 album, Eddie Heywood.

== Other charting versions ==
- The Diamonds released a version of the song as a single which reached No. 34 on the U.S. pop chart in 1956. Lyrics were added to the song by Judy Spencer.

== Other versions ==
- Earl Grant featuring Van Alexander an His Orchestra released a version of the song on a 1956 EP.
- Ken Mackintosh and His Orchestra released a version of the song as the B-side to his 1956 single "Highway Patrol".
- Dick Hyman released a version of the song on his 1962 album, Provocative Piano, Vol. 2.
- The Jonah Jones Quartet released a version of the song on his 1961 album, Great Instrumental Hits Styled by Jonah Jones.
- Jimmy Forrest released a version of the song as the B-side to his 1962 single "Theme from Experiment in Terror". It was featured on his album Soul Street.
- Gene Ammons released a version of the song on his 1963 album, Boss Soul!
- Julie London released a version of the song on her 1963 album, The Wonderful World of Julie London.
- The Carol Lou Trio released a version of the song as a single as part of a medley with "Canadian Sunset" in 1969, but it did not chart.
- Steve Khan released a version of the song on his 1977 album, Tightrope.
- Winifred Atwell released a version of the song on her 2003 compilation album, Hall of Fame/Rhapsody in Blue.
- Frank Chacksfield and His Tunesmiths released a version of the song as the B side of their single ‘Fandango’ in September 1956, as Decca F.10786
