= Tim Jorden =

American football player (born 1966)

No. 85, 84
- Position: Tight end

Personal information
- Born: October 30, 1966 (age 60); Lakewood, Ohio, U.S.
- Listed height: 6 ft 3 in (1.91 m)
- Listed weight: 235 lb (107 kg)

Career information
- High school: Fenwick (Middletown, Ohio)
- College: Indiana
- NFL draft: 1989: undrafted

Career history
- Arizona Cardinals (1989–1991); Pittsburgh Steelers (1992–1993); San Francisco 49ers (1995)

Awards and highlights
- Second-team All-Big Ten (1988)

Career NFL statistics
- Receptions: 24
- Receiving yards: 177
- Touchdowns: 2
- Stats at Pro Football Reference

Tim Jorden (born October 30, 1966) is an American former professional football player who was a tight end for six seasons in the National Football League (NFL). Jorden played college football for the Indiana Hoosiers, where he graduated with a degree in finance.

He played for two seasons with the Pittsburgh Steelers, one with the San Francisco 49ers, and another three with the Arizona Cardinals.

Currently, Jorden resides in Scottsdale, Arizona, where he is a Loan Officer with Homeowners Financial Group.
