= Fun with Radio =

1957 children's radio handbook

Fun with Radio is a book by Gilbert Davey first published in 1957 by Edmund Ward Ltd (London).

Written when radio receivers were still very expensive, and portable radios still a rarity (transistors were just being introduced), the book aimed to introduce children, mainly boys, to radio construction and possibly a career in radio or electronics. Radio construction was, in the early years of broadcasting, a very popular hobby among boys. By the time he published 'Fun with Radio', Davey already had a following among readers of the Boy's Own Paper, where he was said to be the most popular contributor on practical subjects among its readers, and in that same year he presented a series on BBC Television's Studio 'E' which reportedly brought him 26,000 letters within a few days of the first broadcast.

Six editions of the book were published, the final one in 1978. Davey also wrote Fun with Short Wave Radio, Fun with Transistors, Fun with Hi-Fi, and Fun with Silicon Chips in Modern Radio (1981).
