= Yelvington (surname) =

Yelvington is a surname. Notable people with the surname include:

- Dick Yelvington (1928–2013), American football player
- Gladys Yelvington (1891–1957), American ragtime composer
- Malcolm Yelvington (1918–2001), American rockabilly and country musician
