= Mark Hedges =

British journalist

Jonathan Mark Hedges (born 24 February 1964) is a British journalist and the editor of Country Life, published by TI Media.

== Early life ==
He was born in Redruth in Cornwall, and grew up near Chipping Norton. He studied geology at Durham University.

== Career ==
Hedges worked at a bloodstock auction house before beginning in journalism with Horse & Hound.

He became the editor of Country Life in 2006.

== Personal life ==
He lives in Hampshire with his wife and three children.

Media offices
Preceded by Clive Aslet	Editor of Country Life; 2006–present	Succeeded by Incumbent
