= Gilbert Davey =

British author and radio enthusiast

Gilbert Davey (7 June 1913 – 6 April 2011) was a British writer and radio enthusiast who introduced many youngsters to the rapidly developing fields of Radio and Electronics through his articles published in Boy's Own Paper, and his books, in particular Fun with Radio, first published in 1957, with updates ending in a sixth edition published in 1978. He also presented, beginning in September 1957, a six-part series on the BBC Television children's magazine programme called "Studio 'E'".

Though an amateur in the field (his real job was as an insurance official), Davey earned freelance income in the years before World War 2 with articles for Practical Wireless and other radio journals. However, they did not make him well-known because many were published without attribution (a list among his papers claims authorship of around thirty articles including a 13-part series for Practical Wireless entitled "At the Short-Waver's Bench").

At the end of World War 2, Davey met Jack Cox, who soon became Editor of Boy's Own Paper and recruited him to write radio articles for the paper. These, and his books (published from 1957 onward and edited by Cox), inspired many British youngsters to go on to make careers in the field of Radio and Electronics, by concentrating on a practical approach to building a progression of radio receivers, starting with a Crystal Set and moving through 'One valve', 'Two valve' and 'Five valve Superhet' designs. Many of the titles sound quaint today, but reflect the excitement that many felt about radio at a time when, despite the fact that broadcasting in Britain had existed for some thirty-five years, manufactured sets were still expensive acquisitions. In 1957 the Walkman, or iPod was an unimaginable dream; so that a 'Portable Cycle Radio' was a high status object of desire indeed for many a boy. In his introduction to 'Fun with Radio', Davey referred to Electronics as "a new modern industry which has rapidly assumed a position of importance in the industrial life of the world".

His designs used a variety of pre-war and post-war valve types such as the 1.4V DAF91, DL94 series, or the 2V HL2K, PM2HL, PM22A series, and generally required two batteries, one of which was a 90V 'HT' battery (an expensive item to be used sparingly). A mains two valve design used the war-surplus, metal-can enclosed, EF50 valves.

When transistors first became available to amateurs in the mid-1950s, Davey was initially cautious, believing that their initial high price and variable performance made them an expensive risk for young constructors. However he soon relaxed these reservations, and his first transistor radio design appeared in Boy's Own Paper in January 1957. The title "Make a Cold Valve Set" summed up the novelty of the transistor.

Davey's subsequent articles and books covered almost every aspect of radio, shortwave listening, high fidelity and electronics for the amateur. Transistor designs came to predominate, and Davey kept up with new developments such as modular construction and integrated circuits. However he never entirely forsook valves (vacuum tubes), recognizing their usefulness as an introduction to basic principles and their continued availability in many parts of the world.

Davey always kept in mind the problems faced by young hobbyists: lack of skill, tools and test gear, and availability of components. Some designs were revised several times over the years for the latter reason.

Davey's last book, Fun with Silicon Chips in Modern Radio, was published in 1981.

== See also ==
- History of Radio
