= The Boy's Own Paper =

British story paper, 1879–1967

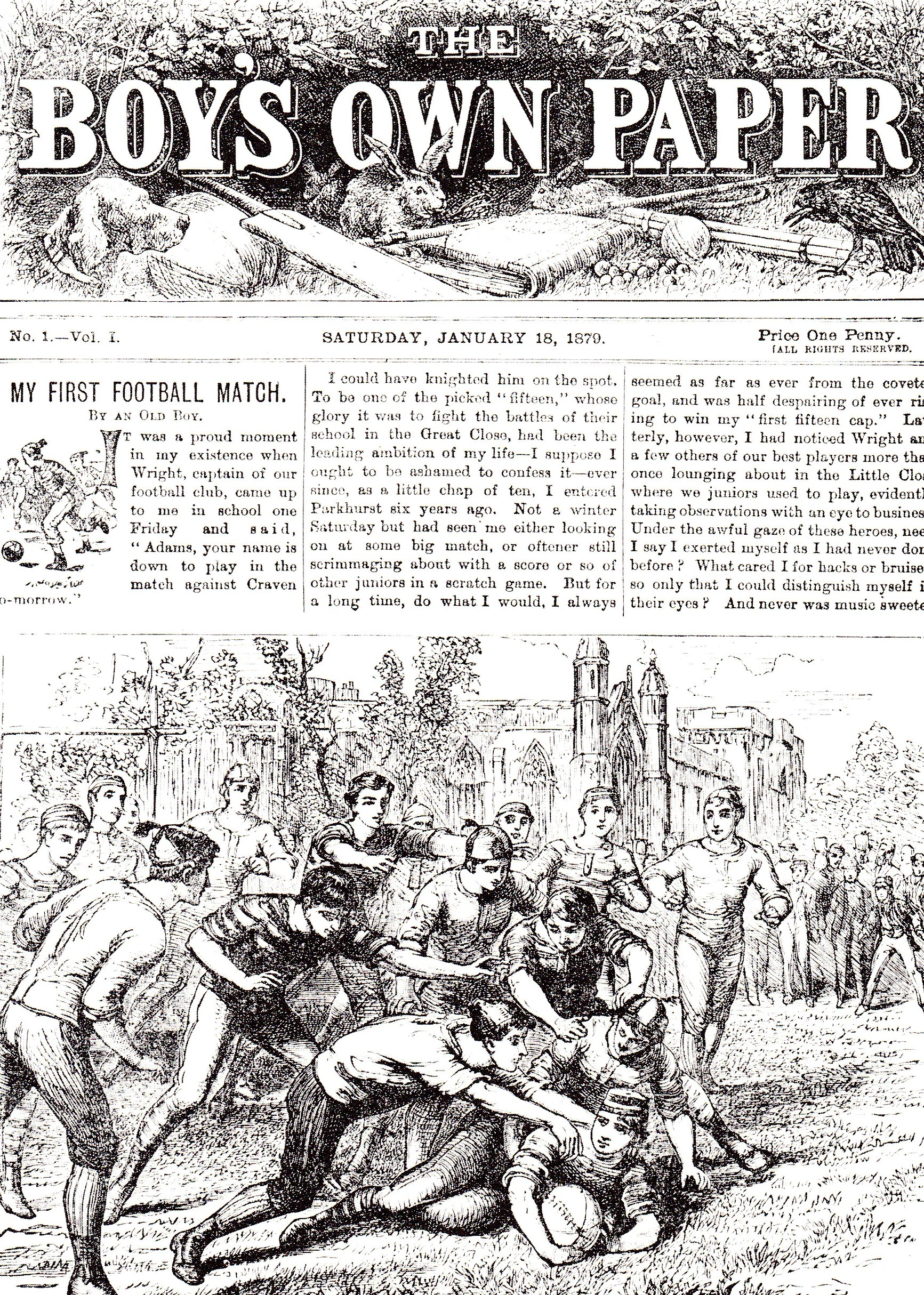
- Issue No. 1, 18 January 1879
- Categories: Story paper
- Publisher: Religious Tract Society (1879–1939); Lutterworth Press (1939–1963); Purnell and Sons Ltd. (1963–1965); BPC Publishing Ltd (1965–1967)
- First issue: January 18, 1879; 147 years ago
- Final issue: 1967
- Country: United Kingdom
- Language: English

The Boy's Own Paper was a British story paper aimed at young and teenage boys, published from 1879 to 1967.

== Publishing history ==
The idea for the publication was first raised in 1878 by the Religious Tract Society, as a means to encourage younger children to read and to instill Christian morals during their formative years. The first issue was published on 18 January 1879. The final issue, a "Special Souvenir Edition, Price 2/-", was dated February 1967 and was published on 27 January 1967. It was a facsimile reprint of the first issue, complete with adverts. It had a panel on the front cover giving a very brief history and stating that it would "appear in future as the BOY'S OWN ANNUAL, edited by Jack Cox".

The paper was launched in January 1879 and published weekly until November 1913, when it became monthly. In total, 2451 issues of the paper were published. There was a separate Christmas Number (edition) of the magazine from 1884–85 until 1912–13 (29 in total) and a separate Summer Number from 1884–85 until 1900–01 (17 in total). These were not part of the annual volumes. In many years the issue nearest Christmas was enlarged (as was the price) and billed as a Christmas special.

From 1879 each year's issues were bound together and sold as the Boy's Own Annual. Volume 1 finished in September having completed 37 issues, then volume 2 started a cycle in which each volume followed the school year (Autumn through to Summer). In the initial years, readers were invited to purchase covers at the end of the publishing year and have the weekly issues bound. This produced some interesting minor variations in order and contents. The Annuals included all the text in the weekly (and later monthly) issues, with additional illustrations.

For reasons now unknown, volume 54 (1931-32) was limited to ten issues, so volumes 55 to 57 ran from August to July. Volume 58 started in August 1935 with parts 1 and 2, then was re-started at page 1 in October 1935, with another part 1. At the same time, the price was halved from one shilling to sixpence, and the number of pages was reduced from 64 to 48. The earlier parts 1 and 2 were not included in the Annual Volume or its index, leaving two 'orphan' issues.

The Annuals ceased publication after the 1940–41 edition as a result of wartime paper rationing. Later attempts at a smaller format annual, under Jack Cox's editorship, were the Boy's Own Companion from 1959 through 1963, and the Boy's Own Annual II from 1964–65 through 1975–76.

In 1939, the publication was taken over by Lutterworth Press, and in 1963 by Purnell and Sons Ltd. It was published at the end of its life in 1967 by BPC Publishing Ltd, who are believed to have started publishing the paper in 1965.

== Contents ==
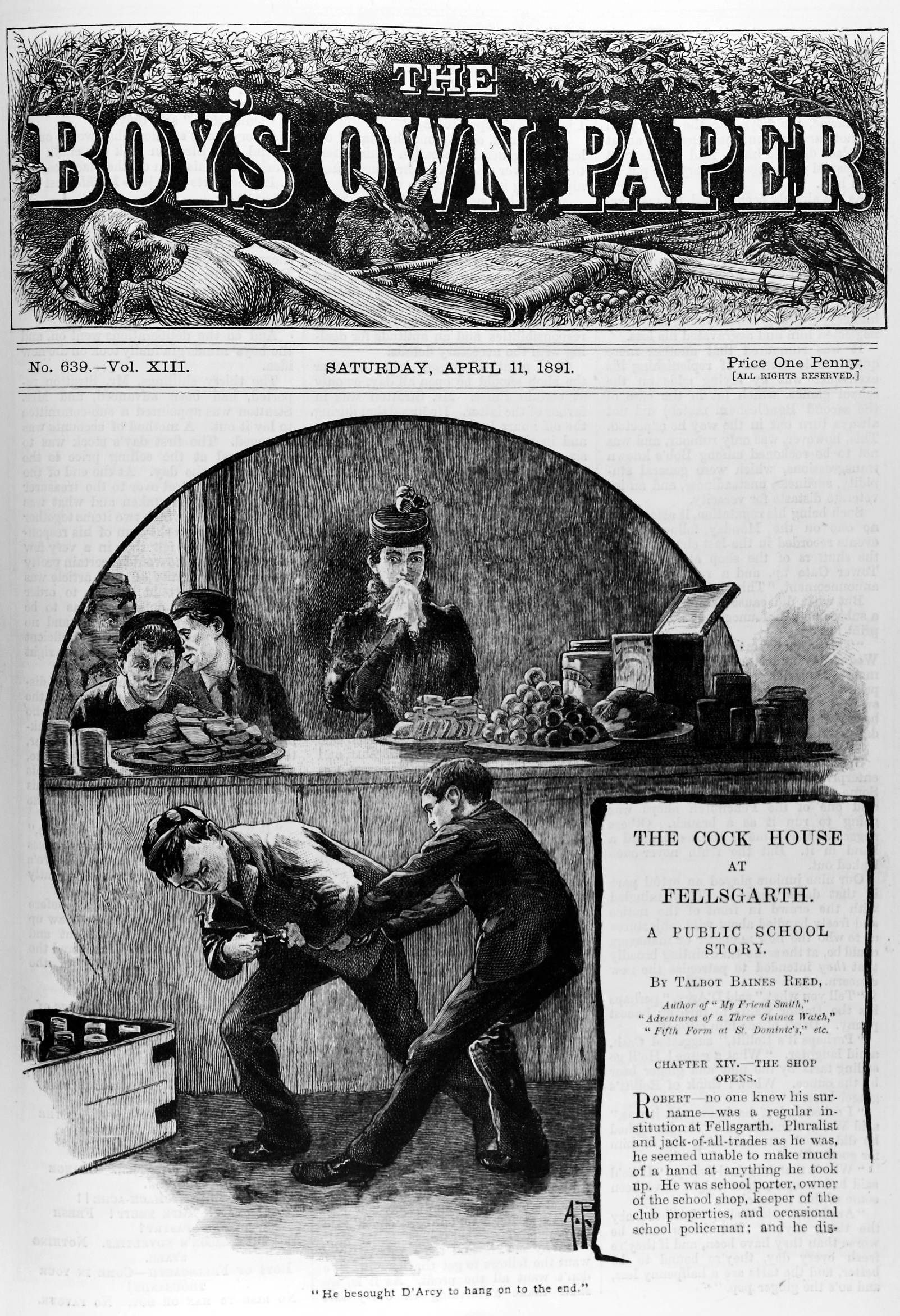
The Boy's Own Paper, front page, 11 April 1891

The contents usually included adventure stories and stories about public-school life; notes on how to practise nature study, sports and games; instructions for how to make items (including canoes); puzzles and essay competitions. One of the stories in the opening issue was "My First Football Match", the first of many by Talbot Baines Reed set in public schools (Reed, who had not in fact attended such a school, later became the paper's first assistant editor); and the first volume's serials included "From Powder Monkey to Admiral, or The Stirring Days of the British Navy". In the same volume, Captain Matthew Webb contributed an account of how he had swum the English Channel in 1875.

In its first decade the paper promoted the British Empire as the zenith of civilisation and reflected the attitudes towards other races which were taken for granted in Britain at the time. In 1885, for example, it described its vision of "the typical negro":

"The arm is two inches longer in proportion than that of a Caucasian, and the hands hang level with the kneecaps; the facial angle is seventy as against eighty three, the brain weighs thirty five as against forty five; the skull is much thicker ... there is no growth in intelligence once manhood is reached."

Readers frequently wrote in with questions to the paper: answers to these letters to the Editor featured in each edition, although the original letter was never printed, leaving readers to guess what the original question might have been. The responses given were often crushingly acerbic and to the point.

== Contributors ==
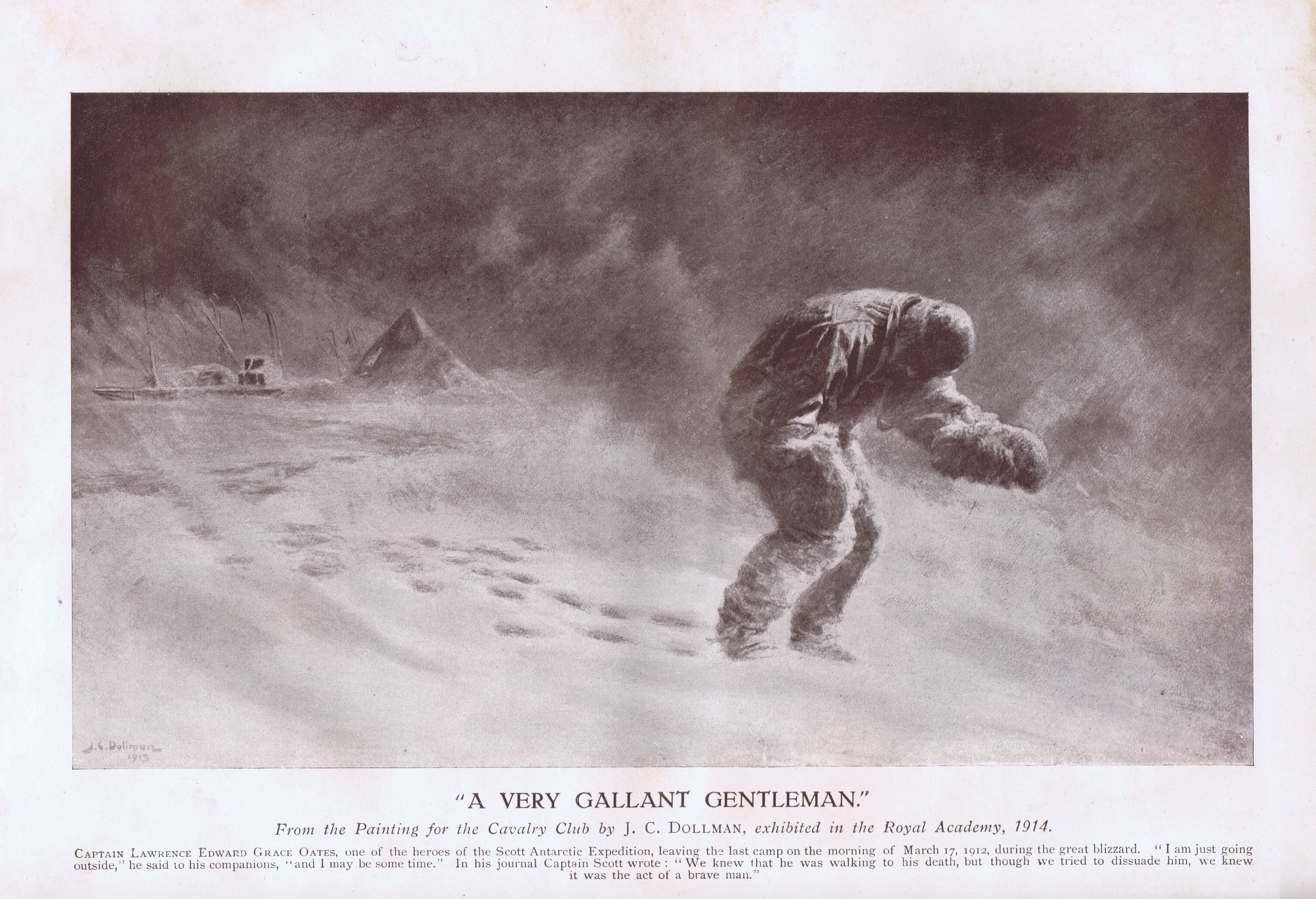
This plate appeared in the 36th The Boy's Own Annual (1913–1914), and is based on the painting A Very Gallant Gentleman by John Charles Dollman. It depicts the last moments of Lawrence Oates.

Many prominent authors and personalities contributed to the paper. W. G. Grace wrote for several issues, as did Sir Arthur Conan Doyle, Jules Verne and R. M. Ballantyne. Robert Baden-Powell, founder of the Scout Movement, was a regular columnist and urged readers "to live clean, manly and Christian lives". Less well-known writers included E. E. Bradford, W. E. Cule, Sid G. Hedges, William Gordon Stables and Hugh Pembroke Vowles. Edward Whymper contributed engravings (including the masthead). Gilbert Davey, who went on to publish Fun with Radio introduced many youngsters to a career in radio and electronics.

Between 1941 and 1961 there were 60 issues with stories about Biggles written by W. E. Johns.

In the 1960s other occasional contributors included Isaac Asimov and the astronomer Patrick Moore, who contributed several articles about the Solar System and would answer questions on astronomical matters in the "You Ask Us" section of the paper.

== Women and the B.O.P. ==
From the first, the Boy's Own Paper had very inclusive editorial policies and practices. Issue No. 1 contained the first instalment of a serial by Mrs Eiloart, and over eighty named female authors followed over the years, contributing short stories, serials, poems, practical articles ('Taming Baboons' for example), and accounts of personal adventures in many different parts of the world. In addition, the work of over twenty female illustrators was published. A number of the monthly coloured plates were by female artists such as Hilda Annetta Walker and Winifred Austen.

Girl readers were positively encouraged, and "A.M.S." of Melbourne was told "… you certainly need to make no apology to us for being "only a girl"!". From the beginning girls were eligible to enter the competitions, as witnessed in this slightly rueful editorial comment: "... it was our intention that the word "readers" should be construed in the broadest way, and that all coming within the stipulated age should be eligible, quite irrespective of sex…". This sentiment was being repeated as late as 1930, when the Editor said "Needless to say, in this as in most things connected with the "B.O.P.", the word "boy" includes "girl." There was even an element of positive discrimination, as witnessed by this crushingly acerbic response to "Squirrel": "Don't ask so many questions again, please. Our limit is three for boys, and four for girls. But you coolly ask five. Go down below, sir, and have your hair cut!"

== Editors ==
Editors of Boy's Own Paper:

- 1879 – 1897: James Macaulay (Supervising editor)
- 1879 – 1912: George A. Hutchison (Sub-editor, acting-editor, subsequently editor)
- 1912 – 1913: George Andrew Hutchison (Consulting editor, died February 1913)
- 1912 – 1924: Arthur Lincoln Haydon
- 1924 – 1933: Geoffrey Richard Pocklington
- 1933 – 1935: George J. H. Northcroft
- 1935 – 1942: Robert Harding
- 1942 – 1946: Leonard Halls
- 1946 – 1967: Jack Cox

== Pricing history ==
The weekly issue was priced at 1d but the coloured plates had to be purchased separately for 2d per month. However, from March 1879 the B.O.P. was also issued in monthly parts, containing the relevant weekly issues and including the coloured plates, for 6d. The monthly price continued unchanged until mid-1916 when, as a result of war-time inflation, it was increased to 7d. In August 1917 it was further increased to 8d, and during 1918 it was increased to 9d, 10d and then 1/-. That price remained unchanged until October 1935 when, as previously noted, it was halved to 6d.

The price was increased to 8d in February 1941, again as a result of wartime inflation. Another increase in November 1941 took it to 9d, and that price was held until October 1950 when it was increased to 1/-. October 1963 saw the final increase to 2/-, which was held until publication ceased in 1967.

== Other papers with similar titles ==
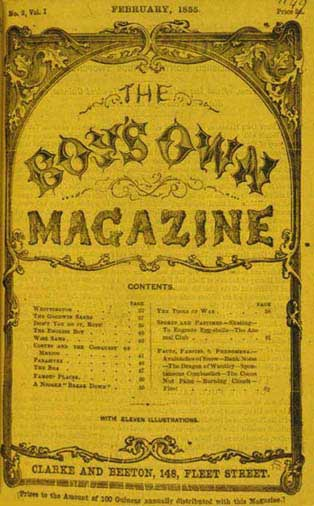
Beeton's Boy's Own Magazine, 1855

From 1855 through to 1920, there were over a dozen periodicals using the title Boy's Own or Boys' Own. The first and most influential was Samuel Beeton's weekly Boy's Own Magazine, published from 1855 to 1890. Another was an American publication named The Boys' Own, published by Charles F. Richards in Boston, Massachusetts from October 1873 through December 1876.

The Boy's Own Paper was also printed in Toronto, Ontario, Canada by the publisher W. Warwick and Sons. These editions were identical to the British editions except for a four-page "cover", dated one month later than the contents, which contained advertisements for Toronto businesses. Examples of these "reprints" have been noted for August 1884 and August 1885.

== In contemporary popular culture ==
In British popular culture, improbable or daring endeavours are often described as "Boy's Own stuff", in reference to the heroic content of the magazine's stories. Alternatively, many associate the magazine with well-intentioned heroes who do not have inhibitions about trying to right wrongs.

In the 1989 book Great Work of Time, dealing with an alternative history of the British Empire, writer John Crowley depicts Cecil Rhodes as avidly reading Boy's Own Magazine when he was no longer a boy but at the peak of his empire-building career.

The publication is mentioned in the 1997 David Bowie song 'Looking for Satellites' on the Earthling album. Bowie himself read it as a child.

Former British Prime Minister David Cameron was described as a "Boy’s Own robot made of ham" in The Guardian in 2024.

== Quotes ==
A small boy in one of our large industrial towns once asked me, 'What does it feel like to play for England?' I could see that he was puzzled and very, very interested. 'Do you play soccer, son?' I asked him. He nodded. 'Then you know what it's like to play for England. Every boy in England who does his best to play a good clean, worth-while game is playing for his country.' Stanley Matthews

Most boys like to think they have a girl friend, especially the 13 to 14 year olds. I would like to see an article on how to get a girl, and when you've got her, how to keep and please her. I would also like to see more articles on music in B.O.P. as I am a trombonist in the Tiffin School Band.

R. Wilmot (New Malden, Surrey)

Editor's Reply : We will bear the suggestion for an article on how to keep a girl friend in mind! In the meantime there is an article on keeping Golden Hamsters on pages 34 and 35 of this issue.

== See also ==
- Boys' Life
- Boys' Own
- Chums
- The Girl's Own Paper
