= Henge (film) =

2012 Japanese horror film by Ohata Hajime

- Film poster
- Directed by: Ohata Hajime
- Starring: Kazunari Aizawa; Aki Morita
- Release date: March 10, 2012 (Japan)
- Country: Japan
- Language: Japanese

Henge (へんげ; Metamorphosis) is a 2012 Japanese horror film directed by Ohata Hajime. It was screened at the Yubari International Fantastic Film Festival and the San Diego Asian Film Festival.

== Plot ==
Yoshiaki suddenly starts behaving strangely, which includes making strange jerking movements and howling. He and his wife, Keiko, go to Sakashita, a student from Yoshiaki's medical school, for assistance. He is unable to do anything to stop these occurrences. Yoshiaki begins to transform into something else. After his wife hears reports of murders happening, she wonders if her husband could be the one committing the murders.

== Production ==
Henge is the film debut of director Ohata Hajime. The director uses "the limits of love" as the film's theme. He also described the film as simply being for entertainment. While the film did not receive any awards at the Yubari International Fantastic Film Festival, Twitch Film reported that the film was heavily talked about.

The film was advertised with a trailer that shows scenes of people in terror with "driving, slashing music" to go along with it. Mark Schilling, of The Japan Times said that the trailer is "a minor work of art". Todd Brown, of Twitch Film, said, "The trailer below gives a good taste of what lies within Ohata's debut, a dark love story about a married couple weathering the bizarre transformation of the husband".

== Reception ==
Mark Schilling, writing for The Japan Times, said, "By the end I felt like laughing, which was better than wondering if I’d ever sleep again". Ian Shone, of Horror News, said, "As the credits roll you’re left scratching your head and wondering why anyone ever thought it was a good idea to take the story in such a feeble and nonsensical direction".

== Cast ==
- Kazunari Aizawa
- Aki Morita
