= May Aufderheide =

American composer of ragtime music (1888–1972)

Background information
- Born: May Frances Aufderheide; May 21, 1888; Indianapolis, Indiana, U.S.
- Died: September 1, 1972 (aged 84) Pasadena, California
- Genres: Ragtime
- Occupation: Composer

May Frances Aufderheide Kaufman (May 21, 1888 – September 1, 1972) was an American composer of ragtime music. She was probably the best known among female ragtime composers. She received training in art music and visited Europe on a grand tour, yet decided to compose in ragtime.

May Aufderheide was a member of the Indianapolis ragtime community that included Paul Pratt, Cecil Duane Crabb, J. Russel Robinson, Will B. Morrison, Julia Lee Niebergall, and Gladys Yelvington. The popularity of her first published rag, "Dusty", convinced her father, Indianapolis loan broker John H. Aufderheide, to enter the music publishing business forming the firm J. H. Aufderheide Music Publisher.

== Songs ==
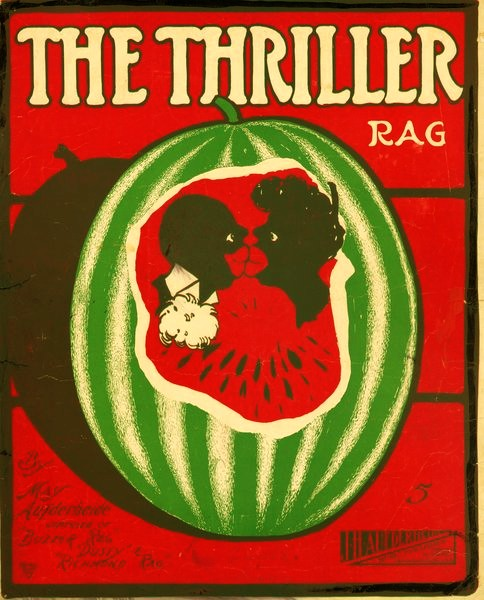
"The Thriller" was one of Aufderheide's most popular compositions.

She went on to compose and publish "Richmond Rag", "The Thriller", "Buzzer Rag," "Blue Ribbon Rag", "A Totally Different Rag," "Novelty Rag", and "Dusty Rag," plus a number of waltzes and other songs including "I'll Pledge My Heart To You," and a song version of "A Totally Different Rag" with lyrics by Earle C. Jones. Other songs include: "I Want A Patriotic Girl" with Bobby Jones, "I Want A Real Lovin' Man" with Paul Pratt, and "Dusty Rag" with J. Will Callahan.

== Marriage ==
She married Thomas M. Kaufman, son of architect William S. Kaufman in 1908, the year her first rag was published and moved to Richmond, Indiana where her husband was an architect in practice with his father. She stopped publishing early due to family difficulties with an alcoholic husband and a troubled adopted child. The family moved to California in 1947 where they lived in a home called "Rose Villa", designed by May's husband, on the grounds of the Huntington Sheraton Hotel in Pasadena. Though she spent the last several years of her life using a wheelchair due to debilitating arthritis, she outlived her husband and daughter, dying in Pasadena, California, aged 84. She is interred next to her husband in Mountain View Mausoleum in Altadena, California.

== Gallery ==
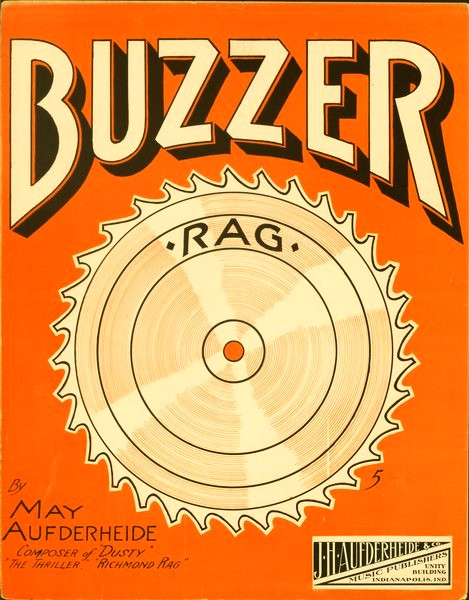
Cover page for the sheet music of "The Buzzer Rag", 1909.

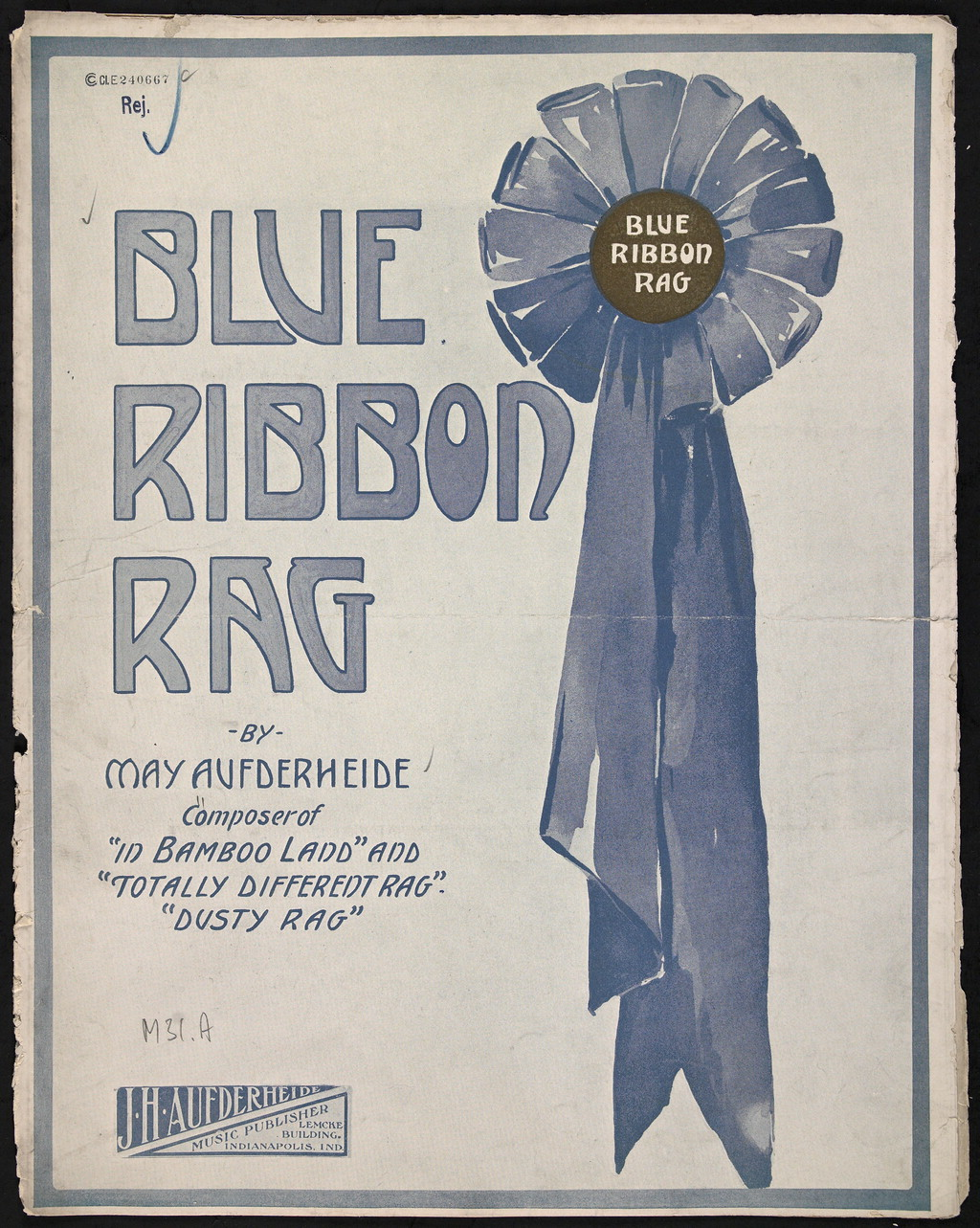
Cover page to the sheet music of "Blue Ribbon Rag", 1910.

== See also ==
- List of ragtime composers
