= Sid G. Hedges =

British writer

Sidney George Hedges (25 March 1897 – 19 July 1974) was a British writer of books and articles on swimming, games and hobbies for young people. He also wrote young people's fiction. He was born in Bicester, the second son of George William Hedges, a draper and outfitter, and Mary Ann Hedges. He married Mary Dixon at Bicester in 1929; their son Anthony Hedges (the composer) was born in 1931.

== Life and works ==
Sid G. Hedges was a prolific author of books and articles on swimming and diving. He also authored numerous books on indoor and outdoor games, hobbies, handicrafts, party games and tricks and several handbooks for youth club leaders.

He contributed articles, short stories and serials to the Boy's Own Paper, Chums, Scout, the Girl's Own Paper and St. Nicholas Magazine. His fiction includes Tol the Swimmer, The Weir Boyd Mystery, Boys of Pendlecliffe School, The Pendlecliffe Swimmers and Tom Thumb Tales with Morals if You Want Them.

He was a Christian and wrote Is There Anybody There? The Voices of God (1971). He also compiled Down to Earth and up to Heaven: Prayers for the Youthful (1964).

== Selected works ==
- The art of badminton (with N. Ferrers-Nicholson) (1934)
- The book of stunts and tricks (1949)
- Children's party games (1955)
- Christian youth, the alternative to Hitler youth (1942)
- Club games and activities (1940)
- Club games for outdoors (1945)
- The complete swimmer (1950)
- Crawl and butterfly swimming (1954)
- Games for small lawns (1933)
- Games for your home (1951)
- The Home Entertainer n.d.
- How well do you swim?: one hundred lessons and the Hedges standard swim tests (1936)
- I write for a living (1946)
- Ice-rink skating: an easy way to waltzing and the bronze medal (1932)
- Junior club work (1946)
- Knowledge for the growing boy (1941)
- The Malta mystery (1932)
- Modern party games (1952)
- Our senior class (1931)
- Outdoor and community games (1935)
- The Pendlecliffe swimmers (1931)
- Plague panic (1934)
- Seeing Europe cheaply (1932)
- Self-help for the violinist (1925)
- Social fun and games (1955)
- Swimming and diving: a manual of modern strokes and dives (1945)
- Swimming and watermanship (1933)
- Swimming in 12 lessons (1952)
- Tales of Pendlecliffe School (1930)
- Tol the swimmer (1952)
- The universal book of hobbies and handicrafts (1935)
- With one voice: players and thoughts from world religions (1970)
- A youth club band (1946)
- Youth club games and contests (1942)
- Youth club work (1960)
