= Anthony Hedges =

English composer (1931–2019)

Anthony J. Hedges (5 March 1931 – 19 June 2019) was an English composer, the son of children's writer Sidney Hedges.

== Life ==
Hedges was born in Bicester, Oxfordshire, and studied music at Keble College Oxford, where his tutors included Thomas Armstrong. While on National Service for two years at Catterick (from 1955) he was a member of the Band of the Royal Signals Regiment. From 1957 he was a music lecturer at The Royal Scottish Academy of Music in Glasgow, and from 1962 a lecturer at The University of Hull (1962–94) where he was awarded an Hon.DMus. During his time in Glasgow he also contributed regular reviews and articles on music to The Glasgow Herald, The Scotsman, The Guardian and The Daily Telegraph. While at Hull he met the poet Philip Larkin.

Anthony Hedges lived in Beverley with his wife Joy where he supported the Beverley Chamber Music Festival and set up his own publishing company, Westfield Music. Hull Central Library established an archive collection of his compositions and working sketches in 1990. After his death in June 2019 his daughter Fiona Hedges acted as executor, owner and promoter of his music.

== Works ==
Hedges is often regarded primarily as a light-music composer due to the large number of recordings of his light orchestral music, such as the Four Miniature Dances (1967) and the popular Kingston Sketches of 1969. But such works in fact represent only a small portion of his overall output. His orchestral works include two symphonies, a Sinfonia Concertante, concertinos for flute, horn, trumpet, bassoon, and the Variations on a theme of Rameau.

There are numerous pieces for chorus and orchestra, including the dramatic cantata Bridge for the Living, (for which Philip Larkin wrote the text), The Temple of Solomon (a Huddersfield Choral Society commission), The Lamp of Liberty, (commissioned by Hull Philharmonic Orchestra for the Wilberforce bicentennary), I Sing the Birth (Canticles for Christmas) together with a number of large-scale works for massed junior choirs and orchestra which have been widely performed. Hedges' chamber-music output was also extensive, from solo to ensemble works and his vocal compositions equally numerous and varied. He also published a considerable amount of educational music.

Adam Davis is recording the complete piano music of Anthony Hedges for the Divine Art record label. Volume 1, recorded in December 2025, includes his Five Preludes, Op. 5, the Piano Sonata No. 1, Op. 52, and the Five Aphorisms, Op. 113.

=== Selected list of works ===
- Five Preludes for piano, Op.5 (1959)
- Scherzetto for piano, Op.14 (1963)
- Four Miniature Dances, Op.29 (1967) for orchestra
- Variations on a Theme of Rameau (1969), Op.34 for orchestra
- Kingston Sketches, Op.36 (1969) for orchestra
- Epithalamium, Op.37 for chorus and orchestra
- Divertimento for Strings, Op.45 (1971, revised 1998)
- Piano Sonata No 1, Op.53 (1974)
- Symphony No 1, Op.57 (1975)
- Five Concert Pieces for Young Pianists, Op.58
- Piano Trio, Op.69 (1977)
- Heigham Sound, Op.72 (1978) for orchestra
- The Temple of Solomon, Op.78 (1979), oratorio
- Four Breton Sketches, Op.79 (1980) for orchestra
- Scenes from the Humber, Op.80 (1980) for orchestra
- Sinfonia Concertante, Op.82 for orchestra
- Flute sonatina, Op. 86 (1982)
- Six Moods for piano, Op.93
- Concertino for horn and string, Op.105
- Variants for piano, Op.111
- Five Aphorisms for piano, Op.113 (1990)
- Four Diversions, Op.119 (1995), for clarinet and piano
- Symphony No 2, Op.132 (1997)
- Trumpet Sonata, Op.137 (2000)
- Fiddler’s Green (2001) for strings
- Five Folksongs, Op.140 (2001)
- Three Explorations for piano, Op.145 (2002)
- Piano Sonata No.2, Op.154 (2002)
- West Oxford Walks (2003) for strings
- The Lamp of Liberty, Op.155 (2005), choral cantata
- Ten Bagatelles, Op.156 (2005)
- Piccolo Divertimento, Op.158 (2008)
- Times Remembered, for soprano, flute, cello and piano, Op.159 (2008)
- Three Humours for clarinet, bassoon and piano, Op.163 (2010)
- Trialogues for flute, oboe and piano, Op.165 (2011)
- Elegy for Tony, Op.167 (2017) (in memory Anthony Goldstone)

== Bibliography ==
- Bayliss, Colin (1990). "The Music of Anthony Hedges". Humberside Leisure Service
- Borthwick, Alastair. 2001. "Hedges, Anthony (John)". The New Grove Dictionary of Music and Musicians, second edition, edited by Stanley Sadie and John Tyrrell. London: Macmillan Publishers.
- Grove, George. 1954. Grove's Dictionary of Music and Musicians, fifth edition, nine volumes, edited by Eric Blom. London: Macmillan Publishers; New York: St. Martin's Press
- Kennedy, Michael (2006), The Oxford Dictionary of Music, 985 pages, ISBN 0-19-861459-4
