= Fred Paul Hedges =

American luthier and guitar teacher

- Born: March 27, 1921; Ewing, Illinois, U.S.
- Died: June 19, 1999 (aged 78); Durham, North Carolina, U.S.
- Occupations: Luthier, guitar teacher
- Years active: 1960s–1990s
- Known for: Guitar building and teaching in Nashville area
- Children: 5

Fred Paul Hedges (March 27, 1921—June 19, 1999) was a master guitar builder and guitar teacher from Ewing, Illinois, and based in Mount Juliet, Tennessee. He started playing guitar when he was 12 years old. He was a musician as a hobby and was a cabinetmaker and die maker by trade. He lived in Ann Arbor, Michigan, where he was a machinist and union labor leader, before moving to Nashville, Tennessee.

== Career ==
Hedges was a long-time friend of Grand Ole Opry star Billy Grammer who hired Hedges to help establish Grammer and J.W. Gower's newly formed guitar company. In the 1960s, Hedges helped make finishing touches to the guitars and set up machines to mass-produce acoustic guitars for Grammer & Gower Guitar Co. in Nashville. In 1974, Hedges and his two sons opened Shiloh Music Center in Mount Juliet. Fred Hedges is credited for hundreds of people learning to play the guitar and other stringed instruments in Nashville, Tennessee. However, due to poor health, Hedges stepped back not long after opening and his sons took over.

== Personal life ==
He has two sons, George and Richard, and three daughters, Gail Harrison, Pauline Williams, and April Hedges. Hedges died on June 19, 1999, in Durham, North Carolina.
