= Clive Aslet =

British writer

Clive Aslet (born 15 February 1955) is a writer on British architecture and life, a Visiting Professor of Architecture at the University of Cambridge and publisher of Triglyph Books. For 13 years he was the editor of Country Life magazine.

== Early life ==
Aslet was educated at King's College School in Wimbledon and Peterhouse, Cambridge, where he earned a degree in the history of architecture.

== Career ==
After graduating, he joined Country Life magazine in 1977 as architectural writer, becoming architectural editor in 1984, deputy editor in 1989, and editor-in-chief in 1993. In 1997 he was named British Society of Magazine Editors' Editor of the Year. After 13 years as editor-in-chief, from 13 March 2006, Aslet left and took on a newly created role of editor-at-large, which allowed him to write more books as well as articles for newspapers such as The Daily Telegraph, the Daily Mail, and The Sunday Times. He has regularly broadcast on radio and television current affairs programmes including Newsnight.

Aslet has published over 30 books, including, in 2012, his first novel, The Birdcage.

In 2019, he established the publishing imprint Triglyph Books with the photographer Dylan Thomas.

Two years later he was one of the small team that founded the Ax:son Johnson Centre for the Study of Classical Architecture at Downing College, Cambridge.

== Books ==
Aslet is the author of:

- Sir Edwin Lutyens: Britain’s Greatest Architect? (Triglyph Books, 2024) (ISBN 978-1-7397314-3-4)
- Living Tradition: The Architecture and Urbanism of Hugh Petter (Triglyph Books, 2023) (ISBN 978-1-9163554-5-3)
- Old Parkland: Community, Architecture and the American Ideal (Triglyph Books) 2022 (ISBN 978-1-9163554-8-4)
- Collecting Nature: The History of the Herbarium and Natural Specimens (with Svante Helmbaek Tirén; Bokförlaget Stolpe AB, 2022) (ISBN 978-91-89425-64-4)
- The Story of the Country House: A History of Places and People (Yale University Press, 2021) (ISBN 978-0-300-25505-8)
- Mawson: The Art and Craft of Garden Making (Stolpe Publishing, 2021) ISBN 978-91-89069-98-5)
- The Academy: Celebrating the work of John Simpson at the Walsh Family Hall, University of Notre Dame, Indiana (Triglyph Books, 2021) (ISBN 978-1-9163554-2-2)
- Building Beautiful: Classical Houses (with John Simpson; Rizzoli, 2021) (ISBN 978-0-8478-7063-9)
- The Real Crown Jewels of England: 100 Places That Make Us Great (Little Brown, 2020) (ISBN 978-1-4721-3375-5)
- Old Homes, New Life: The Resurgence of the British Country House (with Dylan Thomas; Triglyph Books, 2020) (ISBN 978-1-9163554-0-8)
- The Birdcage (Cumulus, 2014), (Sandstone Press, 2016) (ISBN 978-1-910985-00-7)
- The Age of Empire: Britain's Imperial Architecture (Aurum, 2015) (ISBN 978-1-78131-225-4)
- Strands of History: Northbank Revealed (Wild Research, 2014) (ISBN 978-0-9576966-2-4)
- An Exuberant Catalogue of Dreams: The Americans who Revived the Country House in Britain (Aurum, 2013) (ISBN 978-1-78131-094-6)
- The Edwardian Country House: A Social and Architectural History (Frances Lincoln, 2012) (ISBN 978-0-7112-3339-3)
- War Memorial: The Story of One Village's Sacrifice from 1914 to 2003 (Penguin, 2012) (ISBN 978-0-241-96065-3)
- The Arts and Crafts Country House: From the Archives of Country Life (Aurum, 2011) (ISBN 978-1-84513-680-2)
- Villages of Britain: The Five Hundred Villages that Made the Countryside (Bloomsbury, 2010) (ISBN 978-0-7475-8872-6)
- The English House (Bloomsbury, 2008) (ISBN 978-0-7475-7797-3)
- The Landmarks of Britain: The Five Hundred Places that Made Our History (Hodder and Stoughton, 2006) (ISBN 978-0-340-73511-4)
- A Horse in the Country: A Diary of a Year in the Heart of England (Fourth Estate, 2001) (ISBN 978-1-84115-375-9)
- The Story of Greenwich (Fourth Estate, 1999) (ISBN 978-1-85702-825-6)
- Inside the House of Lords (with Derry Moore; HarperCollins, 1998) (ISBN 978-0-00-414047-6)
- Anyone for England? (Little Brown, 1997) (ISBN 978-0-316-88172-2)
- Countryblast: Your Countryside Needs You Now (John Murray Publishers Ltd., 1991) (ISBN 978-0-7195-4945-8)
- The American Country House (Yale University Press, 1990) (ISBN 978-0-300-10505-6)
- Quinlan Terry: The Revival of Architecture (Viking, 1986) (ISBN 978-0-670-80831-1)
- The National Trust Book of the English house (Viking, 1985) (ISBN 978-0-670-80175-6)
- A History of Elveden (Christie, Manson & Woods Ltds., Sales Catalogue, 1984)
- Enchanted Forest: The Story of Stansted in Sussex (with the 10th Earl of Bessborough; Weidenfeld & Nicolson, 1984) (ISBN 978-0-297-78491-3)
- The Last Country Houses (Yale University Press, 1982) (ISBN 978-0-300-02904-8)
