= Eddie Heywood =

American jazz pianist and composer (1915–1989)

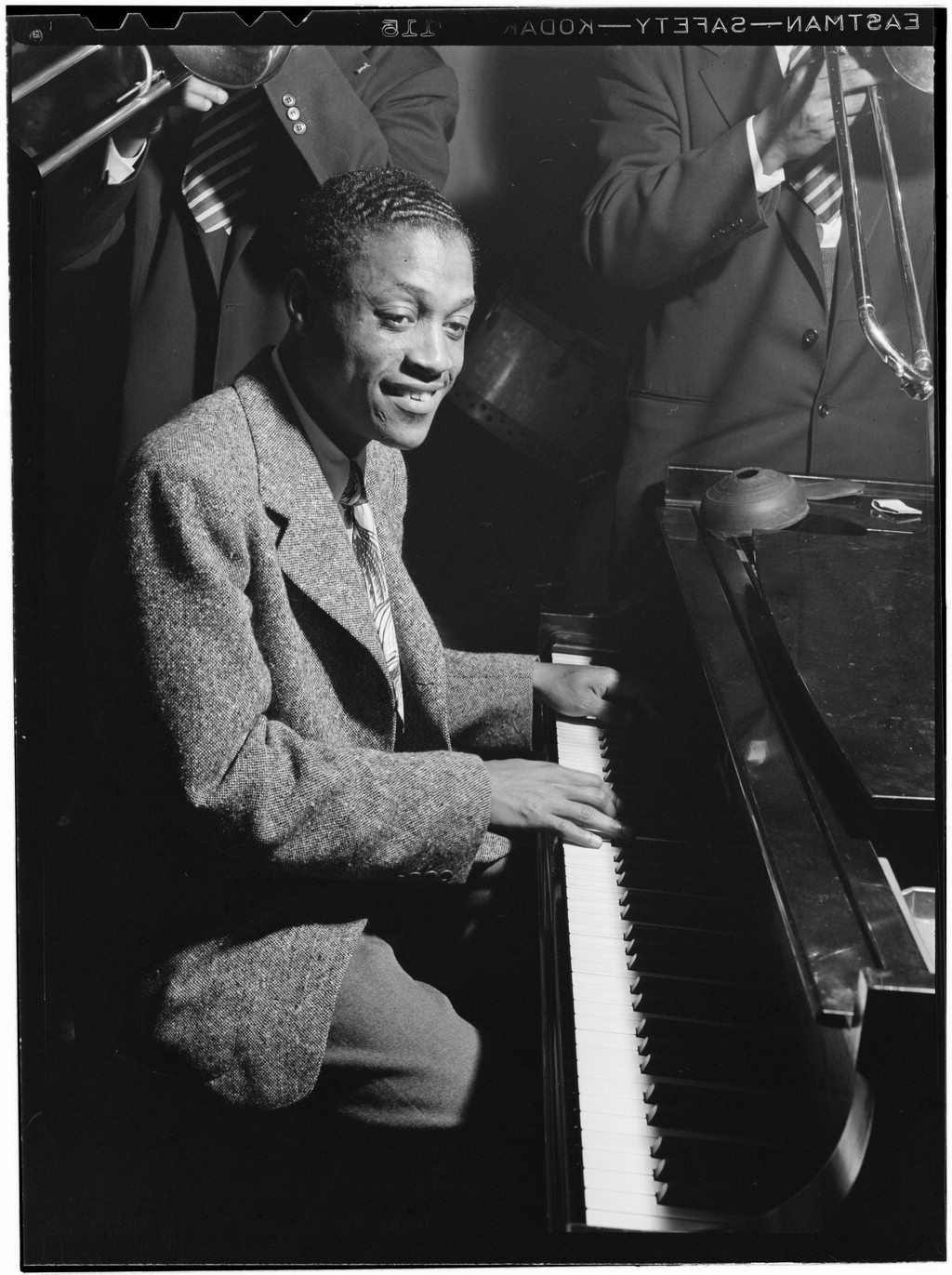
- Heywood at the Three Deuces, New York City, c. May 1946

Background information
- Birth name: Edward Heywood Jr.
- Born: December 4, 1915 Atlanta, Georgia, U.S.
- Died: January 3, 1989 (aged 73) Miami Beach, Florida, U.S.
- Genres: Jazz, swing, Dixieland
- Occupation: Musician
- Instrument: Piano
- Years active: 1940s–1980s

Edward Heywood Jr. (December 4, 1915 – January 3, 1989) was an American jazz pianist and composer particularly active in the 1940s and 1950s.

== Biography ==
Heywood was born in Atlanta, Georgia, United States. His father, Eddie Heywood Sr., was also a jazz musician from the 1920s and provided him with training from the age of 12 as an accompanist playing in the pit band in a vaudeville theater in Atlanta, occasionally accompanying singers such as Bessie Smith and Ethel Waters. Heywood moved, first to New Orleans and then to Kansas City, when vaudeville began to be replaced by sound pictures. Heywood played with jazz musicians such as Wayman Carver in 1932, Clarence Love from 1934 to 1937 and Benny Carter, who heard him in Kansas City playing with Clarence Love, from 1939 to 1940 after moving to New York City in 1938.

After starting his band, Heywood would occasionally provide accompaniment for Billie Holiday in 1941. In 1943, Heywood took several solos on a Coleman Hawkins quartet date (including "The Man I Love") and put together a sextet, including Doc Cheatham (tpt), Vic Dickenson (tb), Lem Davis (as), Al Lucas (b), and Jack Parker (d). After their version of "Begin the Beguine" became a hit in 1944, the group had three successful years. "Begin the Beguine" sold over one million copies, and was awarded a gold disc by the RIAA.

In 1947, Heywood was stricken with a partial paralysis of his hands and was unable to perform. However, he made a comeback in 1951. In the 1950s, Heywood composed and recorded "Land of Dreams" and "Soft Summer Breeze" (1956) (which peaked at number 11 on the Billboard chart). His 1956 recording of his composition "Canadian Sunset", with Hugo Winterhalter and His Orchestra for RCA Victor, peaked at number 2. After a second partial paralysis from 1966 to 1969, Heywood made another comeback and continued his career into the 1980s.

Heywood died at home in Miami Beach, Florida, aged 73. Parkinson's disease had been complicated by Alzheimer's disease, and he had been in poor health for five years.

He has a "Star" at 1709 Vine Street on the Hollywood Walk of Fame.
