= Robbie Hedges =

American politician, Chief of the Peoria Tribe

Peoria tribe leader
- Preceded by: Joe Goforth

Personal details
- Known for: First woman elected as Chief of the Peoria Tribe, in 2000

Robbie Hedges is the former chief of the Peoria tribe of Indians of Oklahoma. In 2000, she was the first woman elected to the position. Hedges, a former office manager, found that no other candidates existed when Chief Joe Goforth resigned. She decided to run in part based on the tradition of tribal service set by her grandmother, who lived to age 108.
