= Hedge (surname) =

Hedge is a surname.

== Notable people ==
- Alf Hedge (1917–1942), Australian rules footballer
- Andrew Hedge (born 1973), Anglican Bishop from New Zealand
- Frederic Henry Hedge (1805–1890), American Unitarian minister
- H. Kay Hedge (1928–2016), American politician in the state of Iowa
- Homer Hedge (1863–1909), American advertising executive
- Ian Charleson Hedge (1928–2022), Scottish botanist
- Isaiah H. Hedge (1812–1888), American physician, businessman, abolitionist and philanthropist
- Levi Hedge (1766–1844), American educator
- Nathan Hedge (born 1979), Australian surfer
- Nathaniel Hedge (1710–?)
- Thomas Hedge (1844–1920), American politician in the state of Iowa
- Trevor Hedge (born 1943), English international speedway rider

== Fictional characters ==
- Gleeson Hedge, a satyr in the Heroes of Olympus books series by Rick Riordan

== See also ==
- Hedge Thompson (1780–1828), American politician from New Jersey
