= John C. Hedges =

American football and baseball coach

Playing career

Football
- 1897–1898: Penn
- 1900: Duquesne Country & Athletic Club
- Position: End

Coaching career (HC unless noted)

Football
- 1899: Ursinus
- 1900: Lebanon Valley
- 1901: Franklin & Marshall
- 1902: Penn (assistant)

Baseball
- 1902: Franklin & Marshall

Head coaching record
- Overall: 10–9–2 (football); 5–12 (baseball)

John C. Hedges was an American football player and coach of football and baseball. Hedges played college football at the University of Pennsylvania. He served as the head football coach at Ursinus College in 1899, compiling a record of 2–5–1. He started the 1900 season as head coach at Lebanon Valley College, but left after posting a record of 1–1 in the team's first two games. Later that season, he played professional football for the Duquesne Country and Athletic Club. He served as the head football coach at Franklin & Marshall College, located in Lancaster, Pennsylvania, for the 1901 season. His coaching record at Franklin & Marshall was 7–3–1. While at the school, he also held the title of "Physical Director" of the college.

== Head coaching record ==
=== Football ===
Year	Team	Overall	Conference	Standing	Bowl/playoffs
Ursinus (Independent) (1899)
1899	Ursinus	2–5–1			
Ursinus:		2–5–1			
Lebanon Valley Flying Dutchmen (Independent) (1900)
1900	Lebanon Valley	1–1			
Lebanon Valley:		1–1			
Franklin & Marshall (Independent) (1901)
1901	Franklin & Marshall	7–3–1			
Franklin & Marshall:		7–3–1			
Total:		10–9–2			
