= Julia Lee Niebergall =

American musician

- Born: February 15, 1886
- Died: October 19, 1968
- Burial place: Crown Hill Cemetery and Arboretum, Section 38, Lot 146; 39.8207377°N 86.1684718°W
- Occupation: Musician

Julia Lee Niebergall (February 15, 1886 – October 19, 1968) was an American musician and ragtime-era composer.

== Early life and education ==
Niebergall was born in Indianapolis, Indiana, to a family of musicians. Her father played double-bass, her sister piano, and her brother percussion. Herself a pianist, she played at public events, as an accompanist for silent movies. and for ballet and gym classes. She also taught music at a high school.

== Career ==
She is credited with but six musical compositions, two of which—Hoosier Rag and Red Rambler Rag—achieved popular success. She was a friend of May Aufderheide, one of the most popular female ragtime composers, who also lived in Indiana, and whose father published several of Niebergall's compositions.

Niebergall reportedly supported herself as a musician and teacher until her death.

== Compositions ==
- Clothilda (1905)
- Hoosier Rag (1907)
- Bryan Cocktail (1908)
- When Twilight is Falling (1909)
- Horseshoe Rag (1911)
- Red Rambler Rag (1912)
