= Joe Hedges =

- Birth name: Joseph Hedges
- Born: September 6, 1980 (age 44); Trenton, Ohio, United States
- Genres: Pop, ambient, alternative rock, experimental
- Occupations: Visual Artist, Songwriter, Musician, Art Educator
- Instrument(s): Vocals, guitar, bass, keyboards
- Years active: 1997–present
- Spouse: Jiemei Lin (married 2014-present)
- Website: www.joehedges.com

Joe Hedges (born September 6, 1980) is an American intermedia visual artist, rock singer, songwriter and musician who lives and works in Pullman, Washington. His primary media are oil painting and new media, using a wide variety of materials including flatscreen televisions and vintage electronics. In addition to his visual art career, Hedges is known as the lead vocalist and main songwriter for the American alternative rock music group July for Kings. July For Kings had moderate success, especially in the Cincinnati area, in the late 1990's and early 2000's. Hedges is also known for his solo songwriting career and more recently for his work with an arts nonprofit he founded with his partner Jiemei Lin, Pullman Arts Foundation,

== Early life and education ==
Joseph Hedges was raised in the small town of Trenton, Ohio and as a kid was always drawing and being creative . Hedges spent his high school years attending Bishop Fenwick High School in Middletown Ohio. Hedges mother was a speech pathologist and his father was an attorney who died of cancer when Hedges was young. In high school Hedges began performing music with friends and formed an Alternative Rock Post-Grunge band July For Kings. Hedges began his art studies at a local community college Miami University Middletown but dropped out when his band signed a recording contract with MCA Records. July For Kings went on to have moderate success with their first album SWIM, especially in the Cincinnati Ohio area. They toured with acts such as Collective Soul and MUSE. Due to music industry woes and challenges retaining band members Hedges gradually shifted his focus from music to visual art, returning to school to study oil painting at Northern Kentucky University where he graduated with a BFA. He then studied painting and electronic media at The University of Cincinnati DAAP, graduating with an MFA in 2012 .

== Art ==
Although Hedges’ primary focus is oil painting and new media combinations he has produced works in many media including photography, video and public murals. His works combine an interest in art history with contemporary materials and approaches. Since 2015 Hedges has drawn from the history of both new media art and representational oil painting to create works he calls “Hypercombines” a reference to Robert Rauschenberg’s idea of the painting combine. Hedges' pieces usually feature painted canvases or panels in art historical styles that evoke the Italian Renaissance or Dutch Golden Age. Alongside, in front of or within the painted areas screens or other contemporary or vintage media objects such as screens, cassette players, speakers are incorporated. These works explore ideas about contemporary media including the negative effects of social media, the attention economy and technology in general. For Hedges, pairing painting with televisions, vintage electronics, and other screens serves as a way to reflect on the lens of technology. Hedges' visual art is influenced by the early internet, Robert Rauschenberg and René Magritte.

Hedges has participated in many exhibitions including solo exhibitions at Bolivar Gallery at the University of Kentucky, Chase Gallery in Spokane, WA and Artworks in Loveland, CO. He currently lives in Pullman, WA where he is an Associate Professor of Painting/Intermedia at Washington State University and the founder of Pullman Arts Foundation, a nonprofit focused on public art.

== Music ==
In addition to his visual art career, Hedges is known as the lead vocalist and main songwriter for the American alternative rock music group July for Kings. July For Kings had moderate success especially in the Cincinnati area in the late 1990's and early 2000's. As of 2016, he has released four studio albums with the band: Swim (2002), Nostalgia (2004), Monochrome (2009), and Middletown (2015). The band's output decreased when Hedges refocused his life on visual arts.

Hedges is also known for his solo songwriting career. Straying from the alternative rock route that he had known so well with July for Kings, he incorporates a more electronica and pop rock sound to his solo music. He has released two studio albums: Curvature (2007) and Alchemy (2010). He has also released one compilation album: Lexington Demos (2008). These albums combine acoustic sounds with contemporary electronic sounds, foregrounding Hedges visual art that also contrasts seemingly disparate approaches and aesthetics. Cincinnati's flagship arts publication CityBeat called Hedges' songwriting "mature and accomplished and his soundscapes provocative and full of depth...Call it imaginative, soulful ElectroPop for grown-ups."

== Music Discography ==
=== Solo ===
- Curvature (Machines & Dreams/Blumpco, 2007)
- Lexington Demos (Machines & Dreams, 2008)
- Alchemy (Joe Hedges, 2010)

=== July for Kings ===
- Swim (Geffen, 2002)
- Nostalgia (Machines & Dreams, 2004)
- Monochrome (Machines & Dreams, 2009)
- Middletown (Machines & Dreams, 2015)
